= List of Caribbean Airlines destinations =

Caribbean Airlines operates scheduled services to the following destinations:

== List ==
Country	City	Airport	Notes	Refs
Antigua and Barbuda	Osbourn	V. C. Bird International Airport		
Bahamas	Nassau	Lynden Pindling International Airport		
Barbados	Bridgetown	Grantley Adams International Airport		
British Virgin Islands	Tortola	Terrance B. Lettsome International Airport	Terminated	
Canada	Toronto	Toronto Pearson International Airport		
Cayman Islands	George Town	Owen Roberts International Airport	Terminated	
Cuba	Havana	José Martí International Airport		
Curacao	Willemstad	Hato International Airport		
Dominica	Marigot	Douglas–Charles Airport	Terminated	
Grenada	St. George's	Maurice Bishop International Airport		
Guadeloupe	Pointe-à-Pitre	Pointe-a-Pitre International Airport		
Guyana	Georgetown	Cheddi Jagan International Airport		
Guyana	Georgetown	Eugene F. Correia International Airport		
Jamaica	Kingston	Norman Manley International Airport	Hub	
Jamaica	Montego Bay	Sangster International Airport		
Martinique	Fort de France	Martinique Aimé Césaire International Airport		
Puerto Rico	San Juan	Luis Muñoz Marín International Airport	Terminated	
Saint Kitts and Nevis	Basseterre	Robert L. Bradshaw International Airport	Terminated	
Saint Lucia	Castries	George F. L. Charles Airport		
Saint Vincent and the Grenadines	Kingstown	Argyle International Airport		
Sint Maarten	Philipsburg	Princess Juliana International Airport		
Suriname	Paramaribo	Johan Adolf Pengel International Airport		
Trinidad and Tobago	Port of Spain	Piarco International Airport	Hub	
Trinidad and Tobago	Scarborough	A.N.R. Robinson International Airport		
United Kingdom	London	Gatwick Airport	Terminated	
United Kingdom	London	Heathrow Airport	Terminated	
United States	Fort Lauderdale	Fort Lauderdale–Hollywood International Airport		
United States	Houston	George Bush Intercontinental Airport	Terminated	
United States	Miami	Miami International Airport		
United States	New York City	John F. Kennedy International Airport		
United States	Orlando	Orlando International Airport		
Venezuela	Caracas	Simón Bolívar International Airport		
