= Canefield Airport =

Airport in Dominica

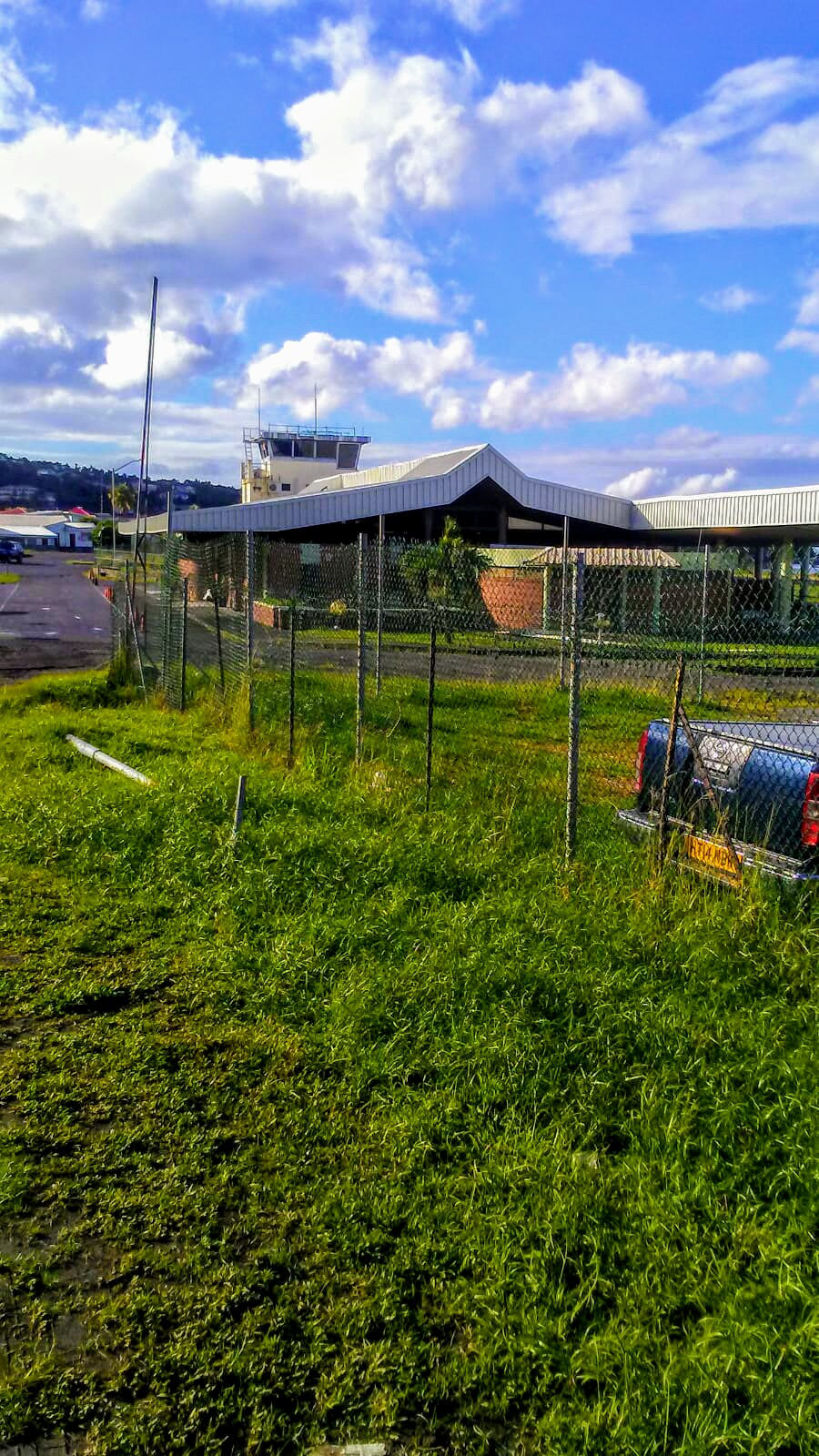
- View of the Canefield Airport
- IATA: DCF; ICAO: TDCF

Summary
- Airport type: Public
- Owner: Government of Dominica
- Operator: Dominica Air & Sea Ports Authority
- Serves: Roseau, Dominica
- Elevation AMSL: 13 ft / 4 m
- Coordinates: 15°20′12″N 61°23′32″W
- Website: discoverdominica.com/en/places/109/canefield-airport

Map
- Location in Dominica

Runways
Direction	Length		Surface
Direction	m	ft	Surface
01/19	954	3,130	Asphalt

Statistics
- Based aircraft: 1
- Source: GCM SkyVector Bing Maps

Canefield Airport (IATA: DCF, ICAO: TDCF) is an airport on the west coast of the Caribbean island nation of Dominica. It is 3 miles (5 km) north of Roseau, the capital. It is one of only two airports in the island nation of Dominica, the other being Douglas–Charles Airport.

Hurricane Maria damaged the tower and terminal of the airport. Construction has already begun to fix the damages.

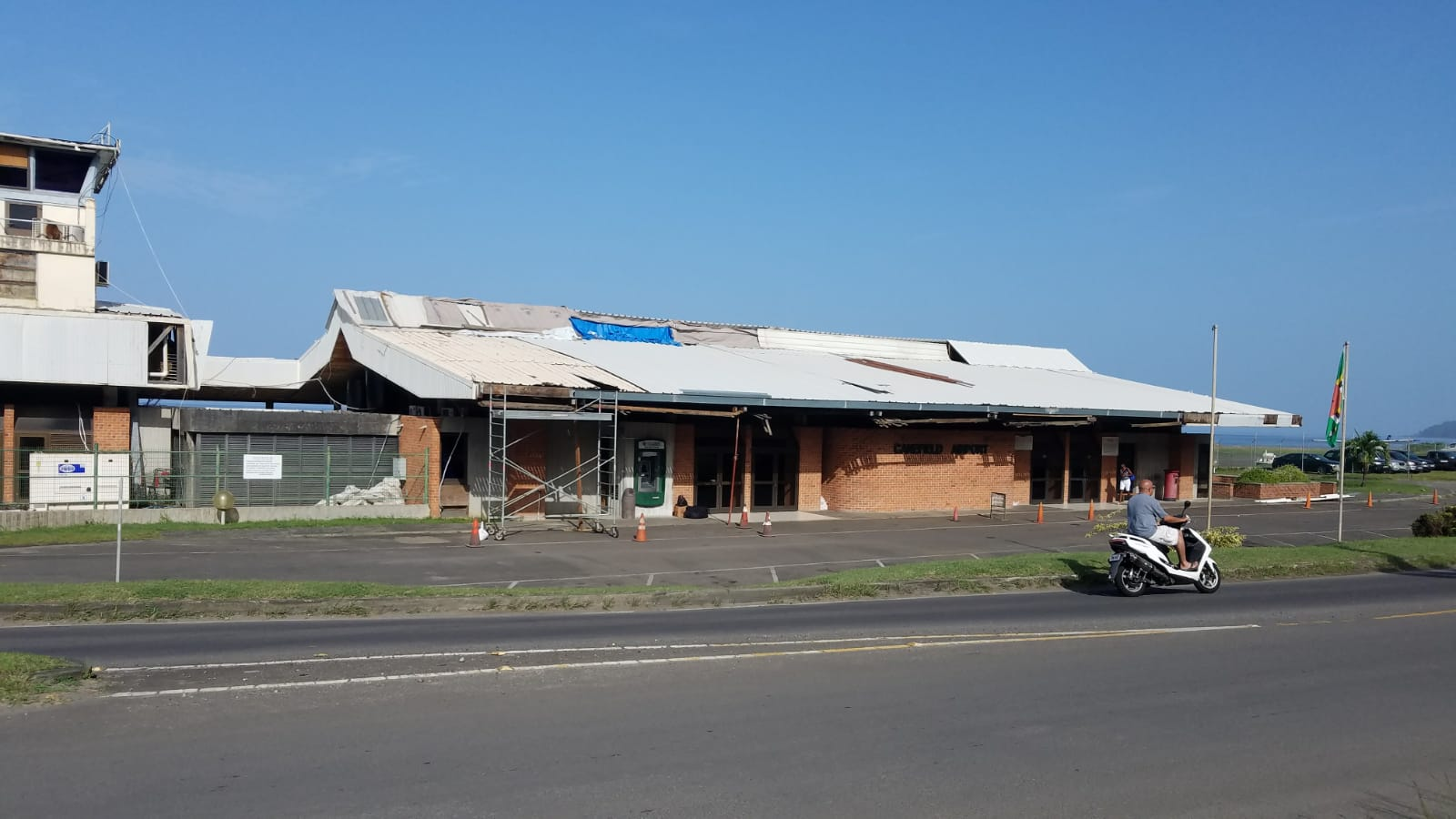
Works being done on the airport

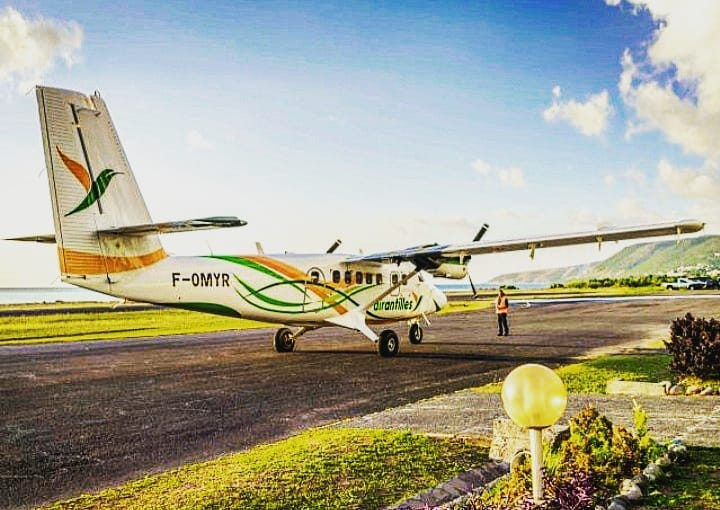
Air Antilles Express DHC6-400

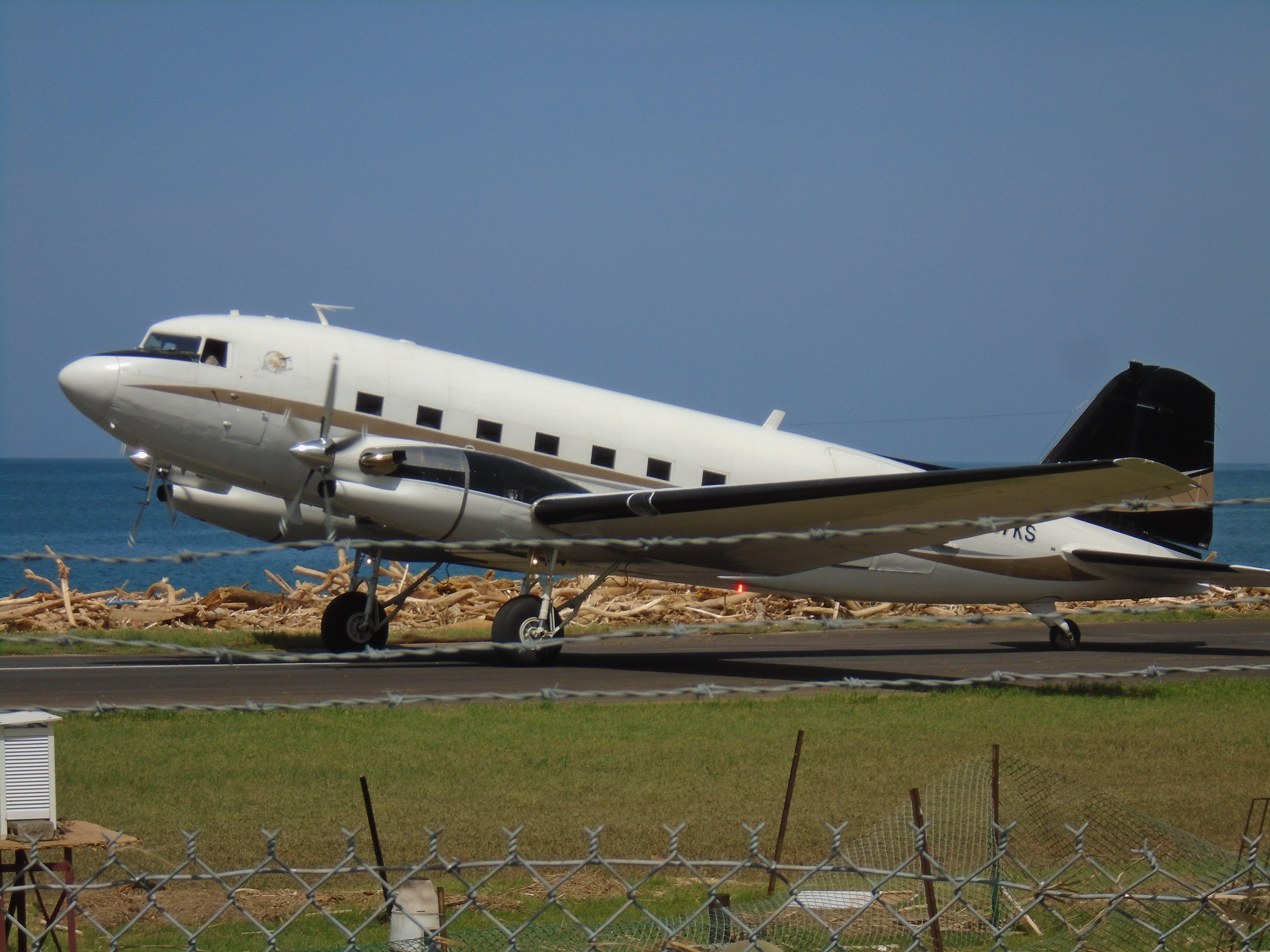
Samaritan's Purse Baisler BT-67 at the Canefield Airport

== History ==
Plans for an airport at Canefield were first discussed in the mid-1970s. Construction began in early 1979 with British funding, shortly after Dominica's independence. The airport was officially opened in 1981, and was preferred over Melville Hall (a two-hour drive from the national capital of Roseau at the time). Crosswinds, "occasional landing difficulties", and the facility's small size plagued its operation from the onset despite being closer to Roseau.

== Runways and taxiways ==
It has one runway 01/19, which measures 3,130 by 75 feet (954 by 23 meters). Runway 01 has a 500-foot displaced threshold. There is mountainous terrain to the east, and rising terrain north and south, with the Caribbean sea to the west. Commercial operators require proficiency checks for their crews to be able to operate at the airport.

Number	Length	Width	Notes
01/19	3,130 feet (954 m)	75 feet (23 m)	Operations between Sunrise and Sunset

== Traffic ==
Most of these flights operate with turboprop and piston aircraft such as the DHC-6 Twin Otter, Beechcraft King Air, and private aircraft.

Though not common, the airport has handled light business jets such as the Cessna Citation Mustang, and the Cessna Citation II on occasions. One of the largest aircraft to ever land at the airport was a Samaritan's Purse operated Basler BT-67.

== Airlines and destinations ==
=== Passenger ===
The following airlines operate passenger and chartered flights to the Canefield Airport:

Airlines	Destinations	Refs
Airawak	Castries, Fort-de-France, Pointe-à-Pitre	
Anguilla Air Services	Seasonal: Anguilla, Antigua, Saint Barthélemy, St. Kitts, St. Maarten	
CalvinAir Helicopters	Charter: Antigua	
Executive Air	Seasonal: Antigua, Barbados, Castries, Grenada, St. Kitts	
Express Air Transport	Barbados, Bequia, St. Croix, St. Maarten, St. Vincent–Argyle	
Fly BVI Ltd	Charter: Beef Island	
Fly Montserrat	Seasonal: Antigua, Montserrat	
Island Birds	Seasonal: Antigua, San Juan	
St Barth Commuter	Charter: Saint Barthélemy, Fort-de-France, Pointe-à-Pitre, Saint Martin	
St Barth Executive	Charter: Pointe-à-Pitre, Port of Spain, Saint Barthélemy	
SVG Air	Antigua, Castries, St. Vincent–Argyle	
SXM Airways	Charter: St. Maarten	
Trans Anguilla Airways	Charter: Anguilla	

- Friday, October 25, 2024, a Press Release statement by SVG Air was issued announcing a new, non-stop flight from the Canefield Airport in Dominica to Antigua, St. Lucia - Castries, and St. Vincent–Argyle in St. Vincent (with a one-stop in St. Lucia) that begins November 24, 2024. This is the first time in years that the airport has had a scheduled airline. Flights will be operated with the de Havilland Canada DHC-6 Twin Otter aircraft.
- Coming soon, are new flights that will connect Dominica Canefield Airport to Pointe-à-Pitre in Guadeloupe. These flights will be operated by [Air Inter Iles] by [St. Barth Executive] using Tecnam P2012 Traveller STOL aircraft.

=== Cargo ===
Airlines	Destinations	Refs
Executive Air	Antigua, Barbados, Castries, Grenada, St. Kitts	
Express Air Transport	Barbados, Bequia, Saint Croix, St. Maarten, St. Vincent–Argyle	

Caribbean and Central American destinations map
Caribbean and Central American destinations from Douglas Charles Airport.

• Red represents year-round destinations.
• Green represents seasonal destinations.
• Orange represents direct destinations with stops.

• Blue represents future destinations.

== Temperature Record ==
On 3 October 2015, the weather station at Canefield Airport recorded a temperature of 35.5 °C (95.9 °F). This is the highest temperature to have ever been recorded in Dominica.

== Accidents and incidents ==
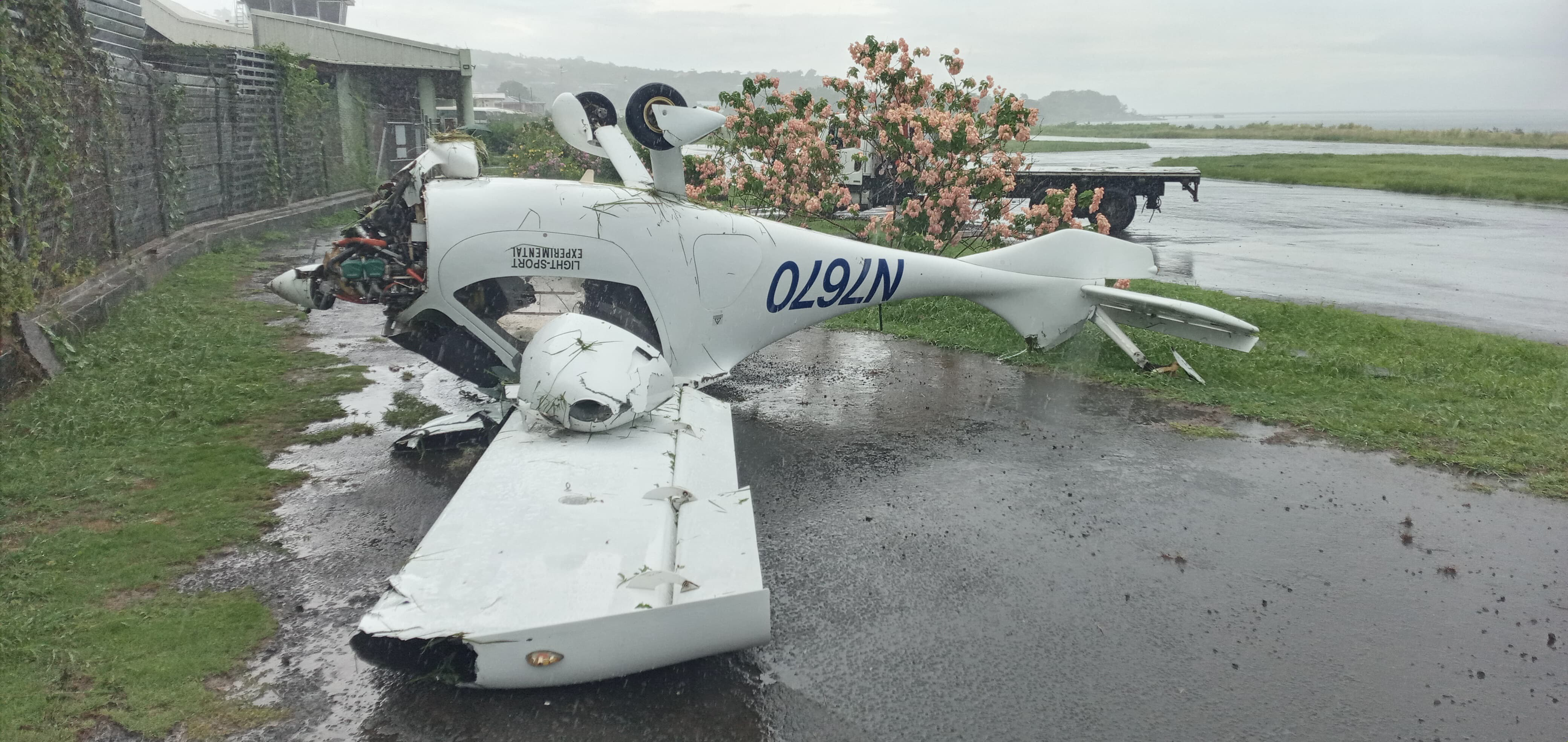
A light aircraft damaged on takeoff in 2024

- On Tuesday, March 1, 2011, a Rockwell Shrike Commander aircraft right main gear blew and the aircraft veered off the runway to the right. There were no injuries and this mishap is still unexplained.
- On Thursday, February 16, 2012, a Cessna 402 made an emergency landing. It landed without further incident.
- On Thursday, February 27, 2014, a Cessna 404 aircraft ran off the runway, suffered damage to the left wing.
- On Sunday, February 8, 2015, a private Cessna 404 aircraft coming from Venezuela ran off the runway, suffered extensive damage.
- On Wednesday, February 7, 2018, a Rockwell Shrike Commander aircraft upon landing suffered nose gear failure.
- On Wednesday, July 3, 2024, a light aircraft Flight Design CT (CTSW) [N7670], was involved in an accident that resulted in substantial damage to the airframe. While on departure, the aircraft encountered severe wind gusts; flipping the aircraft. There were reports of minor injuries to the occupants onboard.

== See also ==
- Transport in Dominica
- List of airports in Dominica
