= List of airports in Dominica =

List of airports in Dominica, sorted by location.

== List ==
Location	ICAO	IATA	Airport name	Coordinates
Marigot	TDPD	DOM	Douglas-Charles Airport	15°32′49″N 061°18′00″W
Roseau	TDCF	DCF	Canefield Airport	15°20′12″N 61°23′32″W
Wesley	TBD	TBD	Dominica International Airport	

== See also ==
- Transport in Dominica
- List of airports by ICAO code: T#TD - Dominica
