= UVF =

UVF may refer to:

- The Ulster Volunteers, started in 1912 and organised as the Ulster Volunteer Force in 1913
- The Ulster Volunteer Force, a paramilitary organisation established in 1965–6, not linked to the 1913 UVF
- Hewanorra International Airport in St. Lucia (IATA Airport code "UVF")
