= Transport in Dominica =

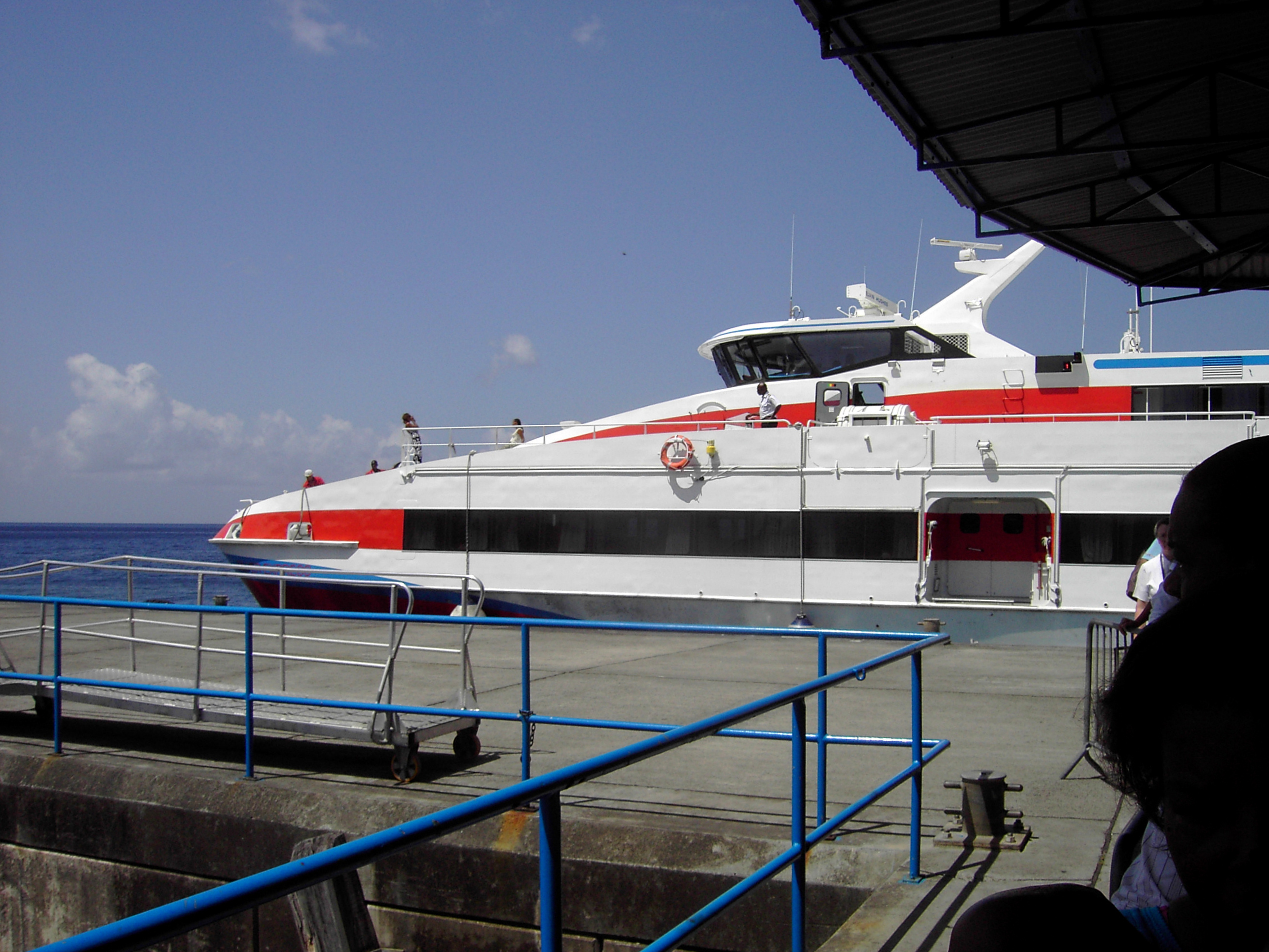
Ferries transport people to the port in Roseau

Dominica is an island nation in the Windward islands in the Lesser Antilles archipelago in the Caribbean Sea. Most people arrive in Dominica via Douglas–Charles Airport, where most commercial flights to the island land. Dominica also utilizes sea transport and a roadway network.

== Airports ==
There are two regional, and no international airports on the island. The primary airport, Douglas-Charles Airport (DOM), is on the northeast coast and is about a 45-minute drive from Portsmouth (1 hour from Roseau). The second is Canefield Airport (DCF), about 15 minutes from Roseau on the southwest coast. Airlines which serve the Canefield Airport are Air Antilles, Winair using DHC6-300 Series Twin Otters, Coastal Air using Cessna aircraft, Anguilla Air Services, Airawak, VI Airlink, Fly BVI, SVG Air and many other regional airlines and charters. Douglas-Charles Airport is suitable for limited use of commercial jets because of runway length. Douglas-Charles currently has regular service by Air Sunshine, Winair and Seaborne Airlines using twin turboprop aircraft like the ATR & Saab 340, as well as Conviasa and Amerijet, which, using Boeing 727 Freighters, is the only airline with jet service to the republic. Since the passing of Tropical Storm Erika Amerijet has stopped all flight to the Douglas Charles Airport. A runway extension and service upgrade project began at Douglas-Charles Airport around 2006 and was finished in 2010. In March 2013, airline American Eagle halted flights to the island citing high labour costs. Currently, the only direct flights to Dominica are from other Caribbean islands. Douglas-Charles houses the Dominica Outstation of the Eastern Caribbean Civil Aviation Authority.

== Roadways ==
Dominica has 1,512 kilometres (940 mi) of roadways, 762 kilometres (473 mi) of these roadways are paved. Dominica's road network runs primarily along the coastline and along river valleys. Major roads are two-lane highways which connect the capital, Roseau, with Portsmouth (Edward Oliver Leblanc Highway) and the Douglas Charles Airport (Dr. Nicholas Liverpool Highway). It takes about 45 minutes to drive from Portsmouth to Roseau. Private minibuses form the major public transport system. These major roads were recently reconstructed with assistance from the People's Republic of China and the European Union.

Due to Tropical Storm Erika, several road surfaces and bridges were damaged by flooding and landslides, including on the newly completed E.O. LeBlanc (Roseau to Portsmouth) and Dr. Nicholas Liverpool Highways (Pont Cassé to Douglas Charles Airport).

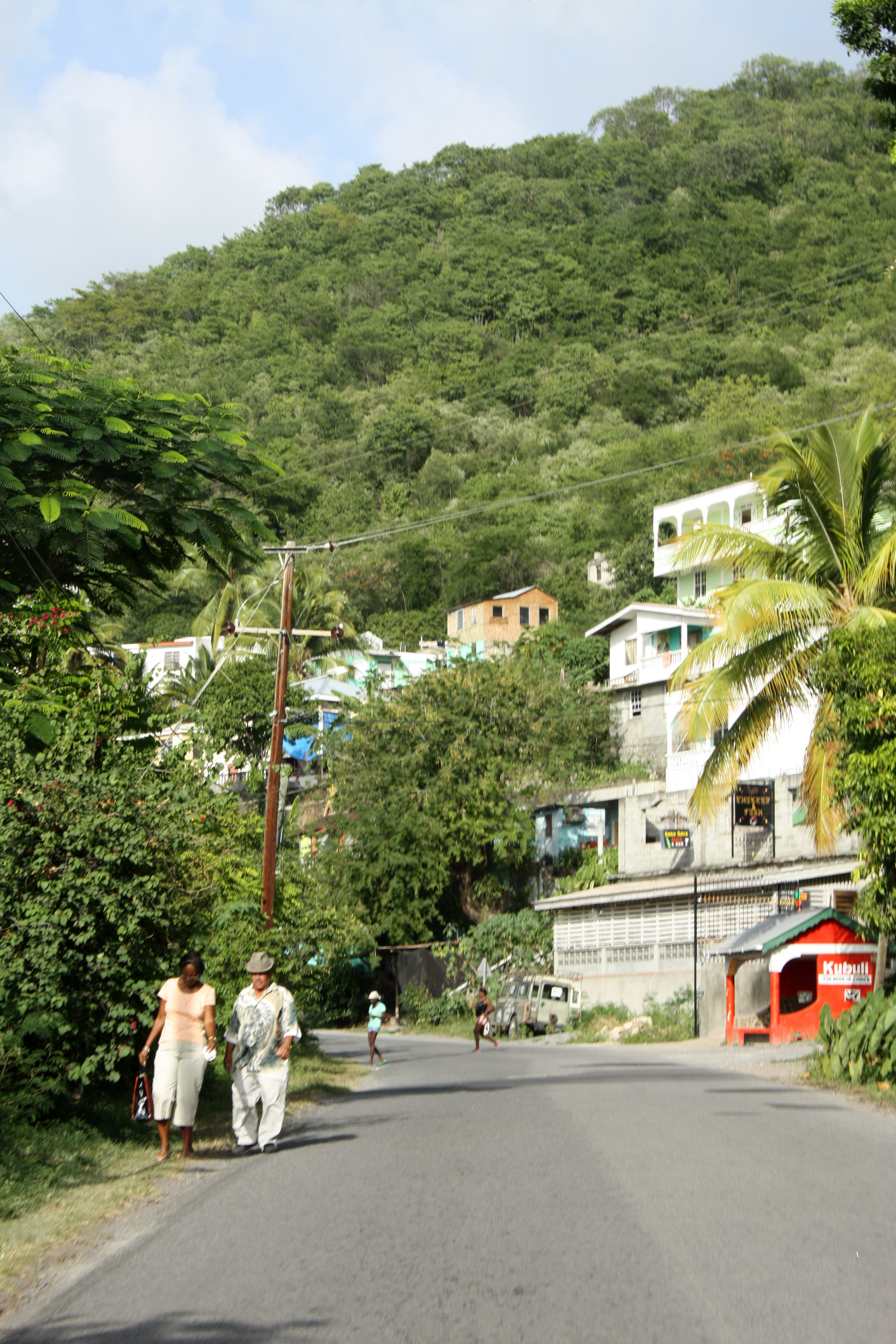
Main road through Colihaut.

== Railway ==
The only railway known to have operated on the island is a short-lived 600 mm (1 ft 11 5/8 in) gauge forestry railway which ran inland from the port of Portsmouth on the northern Leeward coast, 45 km 28 miles north of Roseau from 1910 until 1913/14.

== Waterways ==
Dominica also provides ports for large cruise ships and transportation of goods into and out of the country. The main ports reside in Roseau, Woodbridge Bay and in Portsmouth. These are regulated by the Dominica Air & Sea Ports Authority (DASPA).
