= Hewanorra International Airport =

International airport serving Saint Lucia

Hewanorra International Airport Aéroport International Hewanorra
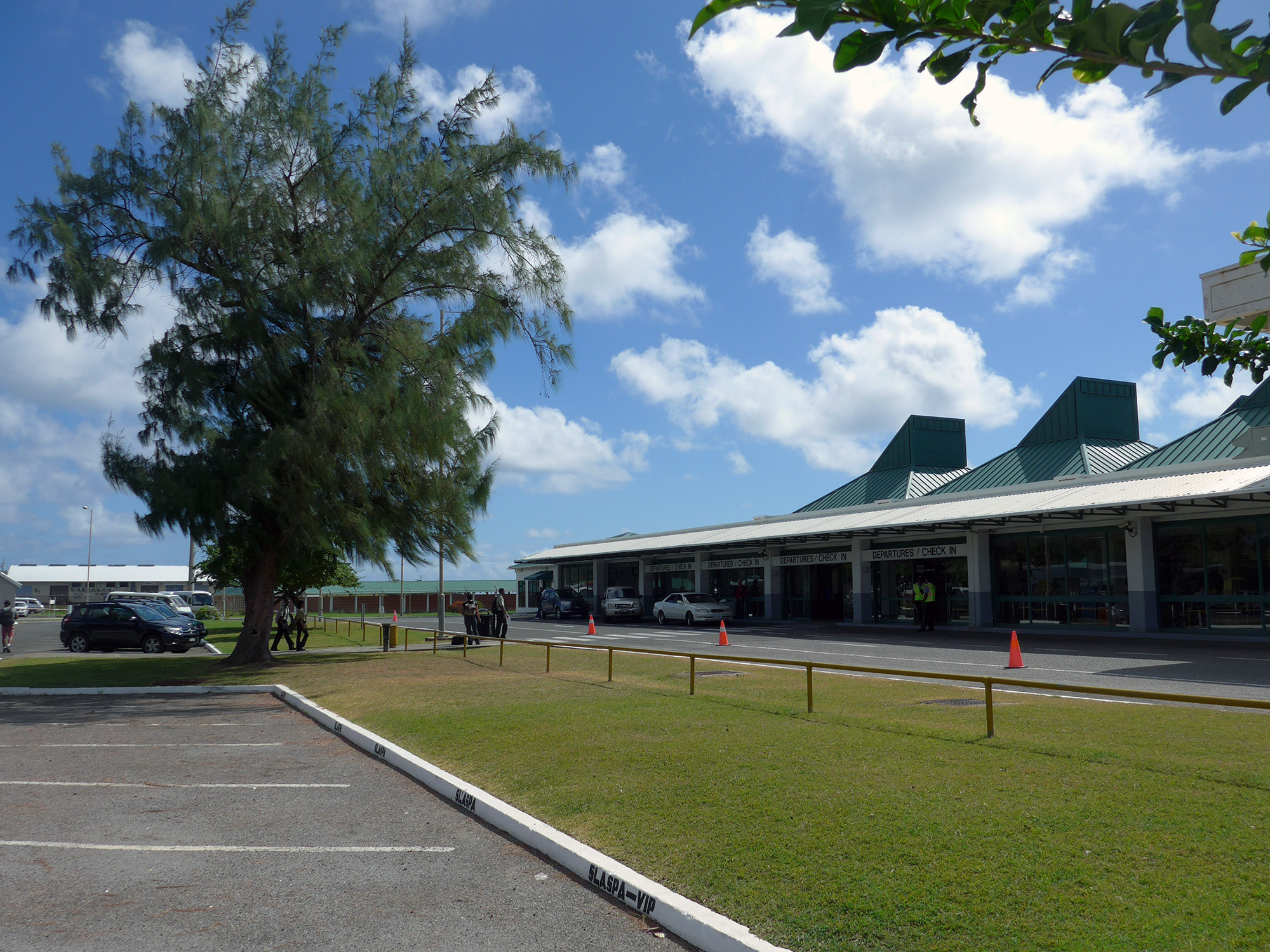
- IATA: UVF; ICAO: TLPL; WMO: 78948

Summary
- Airport type: Public
- Owner: Government of Saint Lucia
- Operator: Saint Lucia Air and Seaports Authority
- Serves: Vieux Fort, Saint Lucia
- Location: La Tourney, Vieux Fort
- Opened: 1941; 85 years ago
- Hub for: Saint Lucia Helicopters
- Time zone: AST (UTC−04:00)
- Elevation AMSL: 14 ft (4.3 m)
- Coordinates: 13°44′00″N 060°57′09″W
- Website: www.slaspa.com/hia/index.php/en/

Map
- Location in Saint Lucia

Runways
Direction	Length		Surface
Direction	m	ft	Surface
10/28	2,744	9,003	Asphalt

Helipads
Number	Length		Surface
Number	m	ft	Surface
H1	16	60	Asphalt

Statistics (2019 Q1)
- Passengers: 223,388
- Passenger change 15–16: ▲2.8%
- Aircraft movements: 5,350
- Movements change 15–16: ▲2.01%
- Source: DAFIF 2019 Q1 SLASPA Statistics

Hewanorra International Airport (IATA: UVF, ICAO: TLPL), located near Vieux Fort Quarter, Saint Lucia, in the Caribbean, is the larger of Saint Lucia's two airports and is managed by the Saint Lucia Air and Seaports Authority (SLASPA). It is on the southern cape of the island, about 53.4 km (33.2 mi) from the capital city, Castries.

The airport is a Fire Category 9 facility that handles 700,000 passengers a year and can accommodate Boeing 747, Airbus A330, Airbus A340, Boeing 777 and other long-range intercontinental jet aircraft. Aircraft maintenance is carried out by Caribbean Dispatch Services. The country's smaller airport, George F. L. Charles Airport, is located in the capital city of Castries and handles inter-Caribbean passenger flights, which are currently operated with regional turboprop aircraft as well as with smaller prop aircraft.

== History ==
Hewanorra International Airport was originally named Beane Army Airfield and was used as a military airfield by the United States Army Air Forces' Sixth Air Force during World War II. Beane Field was activated in early 1941 with a mission to defend Saint Lucia as well as the Caribbean region against an enemy attack. It was subsequently renamed Beane Air Force Base and was operated by the U.S. Air Force before being closed in 1949.

The former military airbase was then refurbished and converted into a commercial airport. There is a disused northeast–southwest runway north of the main east–west runway that was part of the military airfield. It is in poor condition, along with a few dispersal pads.

The name of the airport is an Amerindian word meaning "(land of the) iguana".

=== Historical airline service ===
BWIA West Indies Airways (BWIA) introduced Boeing 727-100 "Sunjet" service into the airport in 1965 flying a round trip routing of Port of Spain, Trinidad - Barbados - St. Lucia - San Juan, Puerto Rico - Kingston, Jamaica - Montego Bay - Miami once a week. By 1971, BWIA was operating Boeing 707 jet service on a round trip routing of Port of Spain - St. Lucia - Antigua - New York JFK Airport twice a week.

The Official Airline Guide (OAG) lists three airlines operating jet service into the airport during the mid and late 1970s: British Airways, BWIA West Indies Airways (operating as BWIA International at this time), both flying Boeing 707 aircraft, and Eastern Airlines flying Boeing 727-100 aircraft. According to the OAG, all three air carriers were operating jet flights into the airport from other islands in the Caribbean at this time with British Airways also flying nonstop and direct service into the airport from London Heathrow Airport. The Feb. 1, 1976 OAG lists weekly nonstop Boeing 707 flights operated by British Airways from both Barbados and Port of Spain with these flights originating in London and also lists flights operated by Eastern with Boeing 727-100 service nonstop from Fort-de-France, Pointe-à-Pitre and Port of Spain as well as direct, no change of plane 727 flights from San Juan and St. Croix with same day connecting Eastern service being offered four days a week from Atlanta, Baltimore, Boston, Chicago, Detroit, Miami, New York City and Pittsburgh via its Caribbean hub in San Juan, Puerto Rico. Also in 1976, according to its system timetable, BWIA International was operating nonstop Boeing 707 service into the airport from Port of Spain twice a week as well as weekly nonstop 707 flights from both Antigua and Barbados with connecting 707 flights twice a week from New York City being operated via either Antigua or Barbados.

British Airways and BWIA International were serving the airport with wide body jetliners in 1993 with British Airways operating Boeing 747-200 aircraft and BWIA operating Lockheed L-1011 Tristar series 500 aircraft.

== Runway and taxiways ==
The airport uses a single east–west runway, connected by two taxiways at its midsection, with turning bays at the end for back-tracking.

The airport is equipped with RNAV, VOR/DME, and NDB approaches.

== Other facilities ==
The airport houses the Hewanorra Outstation of the Eastern Caribbean Civil Aviation Authority.

== Airlines and destinations ==
=== Passenger ===
Airlines	Destinations	Refs
Air Canada Rouge	Toronto–Pearson	
American Airlines	Charlotte, Miami; Seasonal: New York–JFK, Philadelphia	
British Airways	London–Gatwick; Seasonal: Georgetown–Cheddi Jagan, Grenada, Tobago	
Delta Air Lines	Atlanta	
JetBlue	New York–JFK; Seasonal: Boston	
United Airlines	Newark; Seasonal: Chicago–O'Hare	
WestJet	Toronto–Pearson	

=== Cargo ===
Airlines	Destinations	Refs
Air Cargo Carriers	Dominica–Douglas-Charles	
Amerijet International	Miami, Port of Spain	

== Accidents and incidents ==
- Quebecair Flight 714, a charter flight operated with a Boeing 707-123B from Toronto, crashed on its approach to Hewanorra International Airport on 19 February 1979. Wind shear caused the aircraft to halt its descent. The copilot, who was flying at the time, retarded the throttles, but the aircraft had just passed the wind shear zone, and the nose slammed into the runway and bounced twice, destroying the nose landing gear. There were no fatalities and only minor injuries. The aircraft was damaged beyond repair and was written off.
- Virgin Atlantic Flight 98 from A.N.R. Robinson International Airport on the island of Tobago landed on a flooded runway at the airport on 24 December 2013. The Airbus A330 sustained damage to panels on the underside of the aircraft near the pack bay. The adjacent Petite Riviere Du Vieux Fort had flooded and Eastern Caribbean Civil Aviation Authority investigators concluded the aircraft landed in one to two feet of water.
