= Dominica International Airport =

Airport in Wesley, Dominica

Coordinates: 15°34′13″N 61°19′12″W

Dominica International Airport is an international airport under construction in Wesley, Dominica. It will replace Dominica's current much smaller international airport, Douglas–Charles Airport. It will have a runway length of 3,000 m (9,843 ft), allowing for wide-body aircraft from North America, Europe, Asia, and Africa. It is expected to be completed in 2027.

Montreal Management Consultants LLC will be building it with Chinese company China Railway No.5 (CR5) as contractors. The airport is being funded under Dominica’s Citizen By Investment (CBI) program.
