= Grantley Adams International Airport =

Airport in Barbados

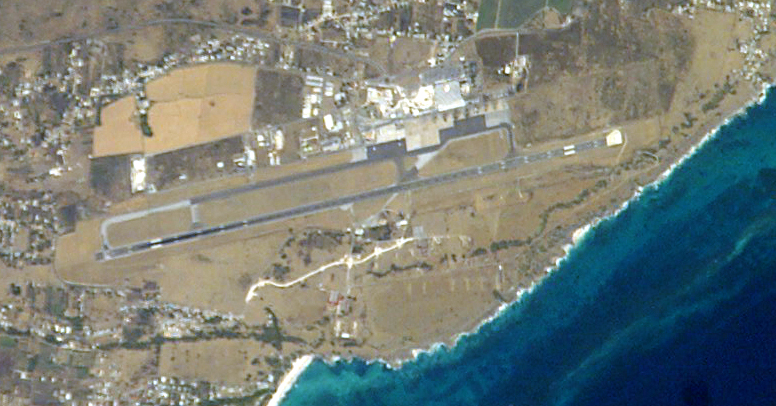
- IATA: BGI; ICAO: TBPB; WMO: 78954

Summary
- Airport type: Public
- Owner: Government of Barbados
- Operator: GAIA Inc.
- Serves: Barbados
- Location: Seawell, Christ Church
- Hub for: InterCaribbean Airways
- Elevation AMSL: 170 ft (52 m)
- Coordinates: 13°04′29″N 059°29′33″W
- Website: www.gaia.bb

Maps
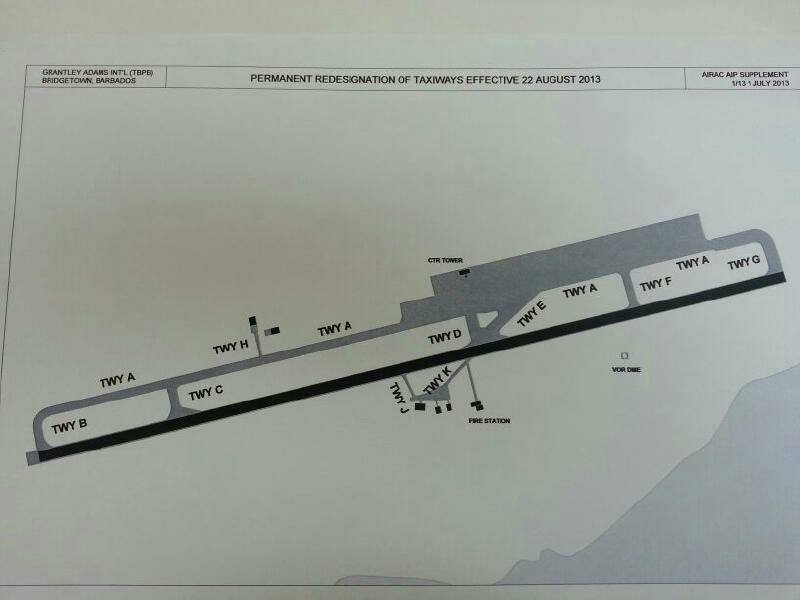
- Barbados airport diagram

- Location within Barbados

Runways
Direction	Length		Surface
Direction	ft	m	Surface
09/27	11,000	3,353	Asphalt

Statistics (2025)
- Total Passengers: 2,417,065
- Aircraft movements: 38,950

Grantley Adams International Airport (GAIA) (IATA: BGI, ICAO: TBPB) is an international airport at Seawell, Christ Church, Barbados, serving as the country's only port of entry by air.

The airport is the only designated port of entry for persons arriving and departing by air in Barbados and operates as one of the major gateways to the Eastern Caribbean. It has direct service to destinations in the United States, Canada, Central America and Europe. In 2024, the airport was the eighth-busiest airport in the Caribbean region and the second-busiest airport in the Lesser Antilles after Queen Beatrix International Airport on Aruba. GAIA also remains an important air-link for cruise ship passengers departing and arriving at the Port of Bridgetown, and a base of operations for the Regional Security System (RSS), and the Regional (Caribbean) Police Training Centre.

The airport's former name was Seawell Airport before being dedicated posthumously in honour of the first Premier of Barbados, Sir Grantley Herbert Adams (1898–1971) in 1976. The airport is in the Atlantic time zone (UTC−4:00) and is in World Area Code region No. 246 (by the US Department of Transportation). It was a hub for now-defunct Barbadian carriers Caribbean Airways. (not to be confused with the currently-as of 2025-operating Caribbean Airlines) and REDjet, the home for the charter carrier West Indies Executive Air, and former home to the flight training school Coconut Airways.

== Overview and geography ==
Grantley Adams International Airport lies 12.9 km (8.0 mi) from the centre of the capital city Bridgetown, in an area officially known as Seawell. This is contrary to most information services stating the airport as being inside the capital.

The terrain is relatively flat and quite suburban. The airport lies in the south-eastern portion of parish of Christ Church, close to the southern tip of the island. The airport has easy access to the ABC Highway/highway 7 heading towards the capital and locations to the north and west coast.

The airport has undergone a multi-phase US$100 million upgrade and expansion by the government, which added a new arrivals hall adjacent to the prior arrivals/departures terminals. Construction was made slightly more complicated because the airport has to remain open for up to 16 hours per day. Its current infrastructure is supposed to meet the needs of Barbados until at least 2015. The phase III construction project, which is yet to be completed will see changes made to the aeroplane parking configuration.

== History ==
=== Early years ===
Seawell Airport during the 1960s

The first recorded flight in to Barbados was in 1929 at today's Rockley Golf Course.

As far as air transportation at the site of present-day facility, then known as Seawell Airport, history goes back as far as September 1938 when a mail plane from KLM Royal Dutch Airlines landed on the site from Trinidad.

During the 1960s the eastern flight-range just south-east of the airport became known as Paragon. This area became the initial base of a 'High Altitude Research Project' known as Project HARP. Project HARP was jointly sponsored by McGill University in Canada and the United States military.

In mid-October 1983, the civilian international airport became the scene of intense military activity. Then Prime Minister Tom Adams, the son of the airport's eponym, offered use of the facility to the U.S. military as a forward staging and support area for the diverse American aircraft which were deployed from the mainland in Operation Urgent Fury. The airport also became a press center for more than 300 international journalist who had been dispatched by their organizations to report on the surprise multi-national intervention into the neighbouring island of Grenada. The younger Adams played a key leadership role in gathering support among English-speaking Caribbean nations for the operation to restore democracy and the rule of law on Grenada after an internal leadership dispute degraded into political assassination and civilian bloodshed.

Also in 1983, the US-sponsored invasion of Grenada prompted the United States to form another agreement with Barbados. As part of the deal, the US expanded a part of the current airport infrastructure. This prepared Grantley Adams Airport to be used as a base. As part of the plan to maintain for lasting stability in Grenada, the United States assisted in the establishment of the Regional Security System (RSS) at the eastern Grantley Adams flight-range. The RSS was (and still is) a security unit focused on providing security for the Eastern Caribbean.

Grantley Adams International Airport, as it is known today, handles most large aircraft including Boeing 747s. The airport was one of a handful of destinations where British Airways' Concorde aircraft made regularly scheduled flights (and got repairs). The flight time of Concorde from the United Kingdom to Barbados was less than 4 hours. The first Concorde visit to Barbados was in 1977 for the Queen's Silver Jubilee. During the 1980s, Concorde returned for commercial flights to Barbados and thereafter flew to Barbados during the busy winter season. On 17 October 2011, ZA006, a Boeing 787 Dreamliner arrived at BGI for testing. This was followed by a 24 October arrival of the Boeing 747-8 for further high humidity environment testing.

=== 2000–2006 expansion project ===
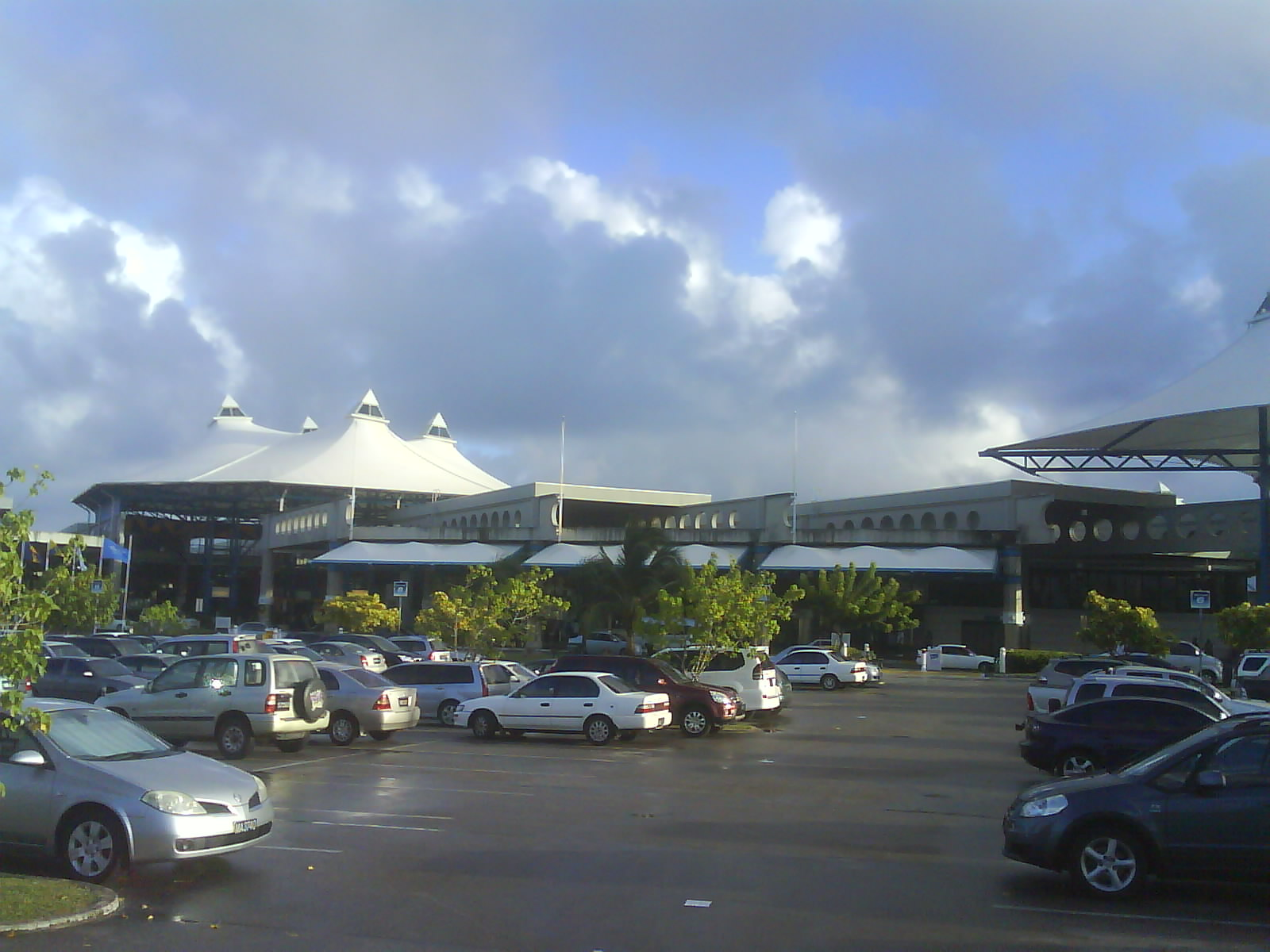
The renovated terminal

Since Grantley Adams International Airport had become a relatively busy airport for such a small island and based on an expected increase in future air traffic the Government of Barbados commenced a US$100 million programme to revamp the airport's infrastructure.

Phase I, which is now complete, saw an upgrading of the runways, taxiways, parking aprons, and approach lighting. This phase included the Government of Barbados acquiring private land adjacent to the landing strip to bring the airport into compliance with new international aviation regulations.

Phase II (also complete) included adding a new arrivals terminal adjacent to the current building; moving arrivals from the older terminal, renovating the older terminal as a departures facility, and bringing the infrastructure into the new millennium.

=== Expansion after 2006 ===
On 1 June 2007, the BBD$1.7 million Club Caribbean Executive Lounge and Business Centre was opened as an added amenity for business travelers. The centre contains 5,000 sq ft (460 m^{2}) and is on the mezzanine level. The centre is meant to be used by special customers of several airlines at the terminal.

The Phase III expansion had to wait until the completion of the 2007 Cricket World Cup. It envisions the addition of new airport terminal Jetway (gates), new spacious departure lounges much closer to the aeroplanes and air bridges to make connections much easier. Also nearing completion is the expanded duty-free shopping area and restaurants for travelers. In 2010 airport authorities stated that traffic to the airport was up 58% and that a 20-25-year plan was being formed for the facility including an addition to the taxiway and renovation of the cargo facilities up to international standards.

After the expansion project, the airport's arrivals facility was moved to a separate new 70,000-square-foot (6,500 m^{2}) building adjacent to the previous structure. This allowed the departures area to occupy much of the previous shared structure. The new arrivals terminal was built with five large baggage carousels, along with customs and immigration windows.

== Facilities ==
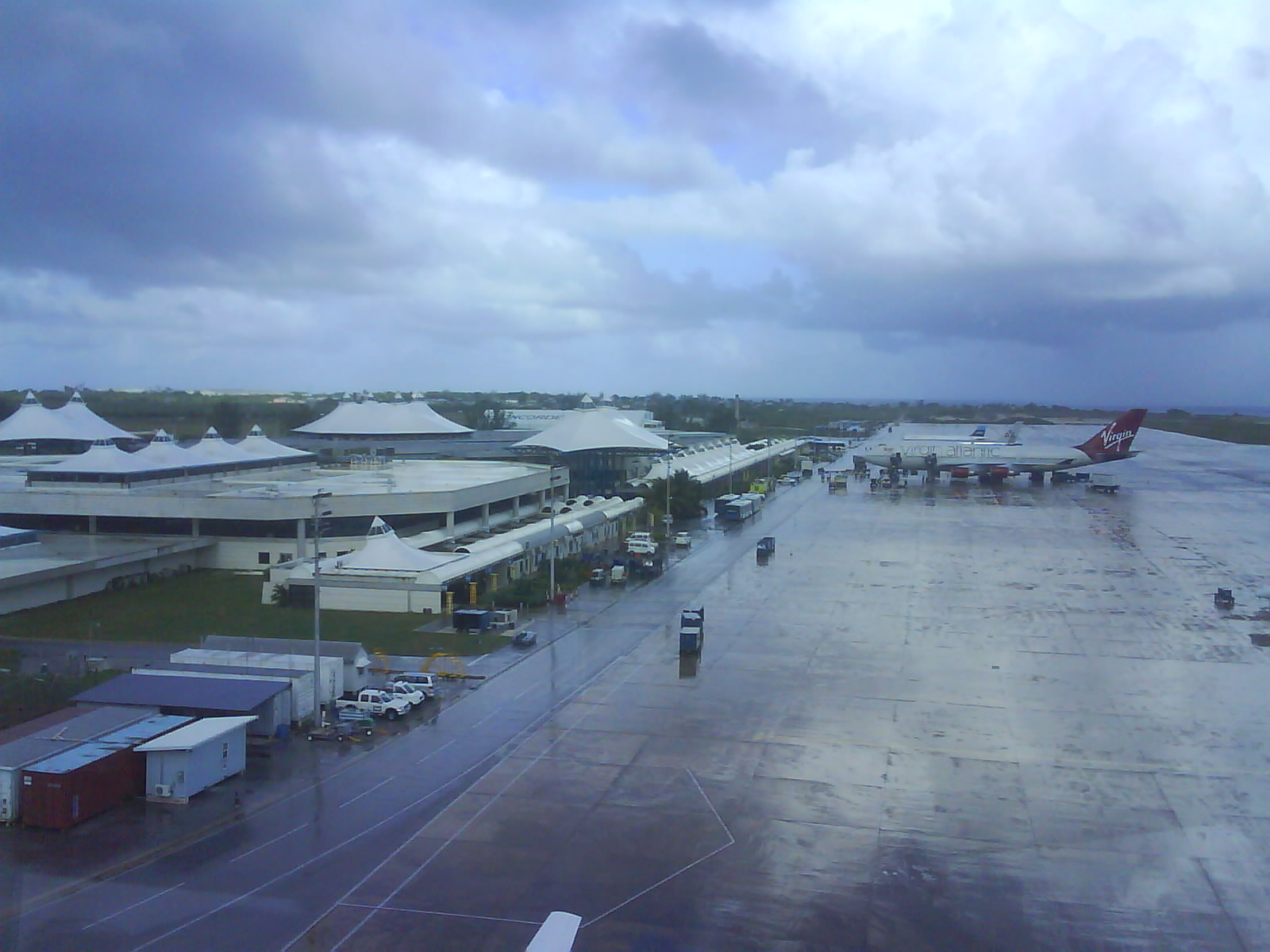
Both arrivals and departures terminals

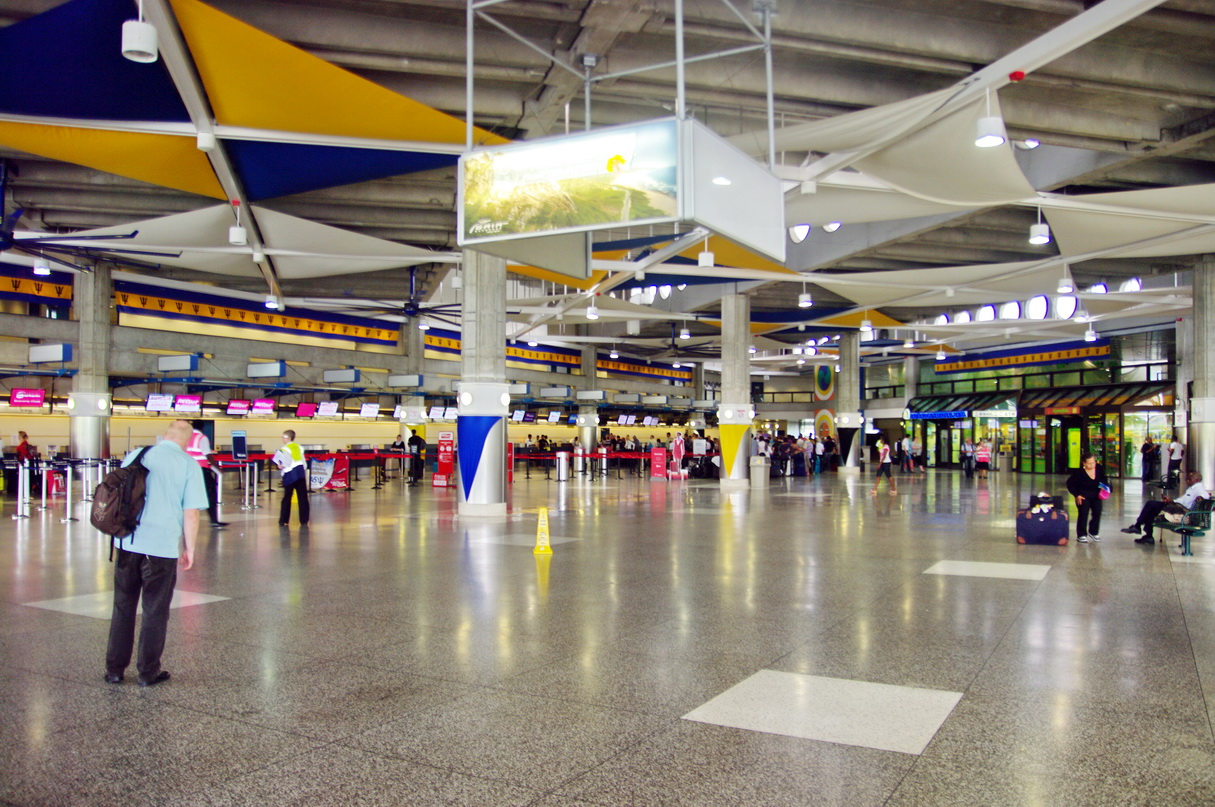
Check-in hall

=== Terminals ===
Grantley Adams International Airport has two terminal buildings designed to appear as one main single continuous structure. There is also a third isolated Concorde Terminal used as a back up during the busy winter season

The first structure and oldest is the current departures terminal. This terminal stretches from gates 11–13. Before the 2000–2006 expansion project, the original single terminal building housed both the arrivals and departures facilities. The former layout was divided in two with a few duty-free shops and an open-air area in the middle with trees and other greenery which was open to both halves of the terminal. The new translucent membrane that towers over the airport shows where the old terminal was split in two. Additionally the membrane tent covers the gap between the old and new terminal and gives the appearance of being a single long building.

The new terminal spans gates 1–10. The terminal currently has 23 ground-level gates.

==== Concorde Terminal ====
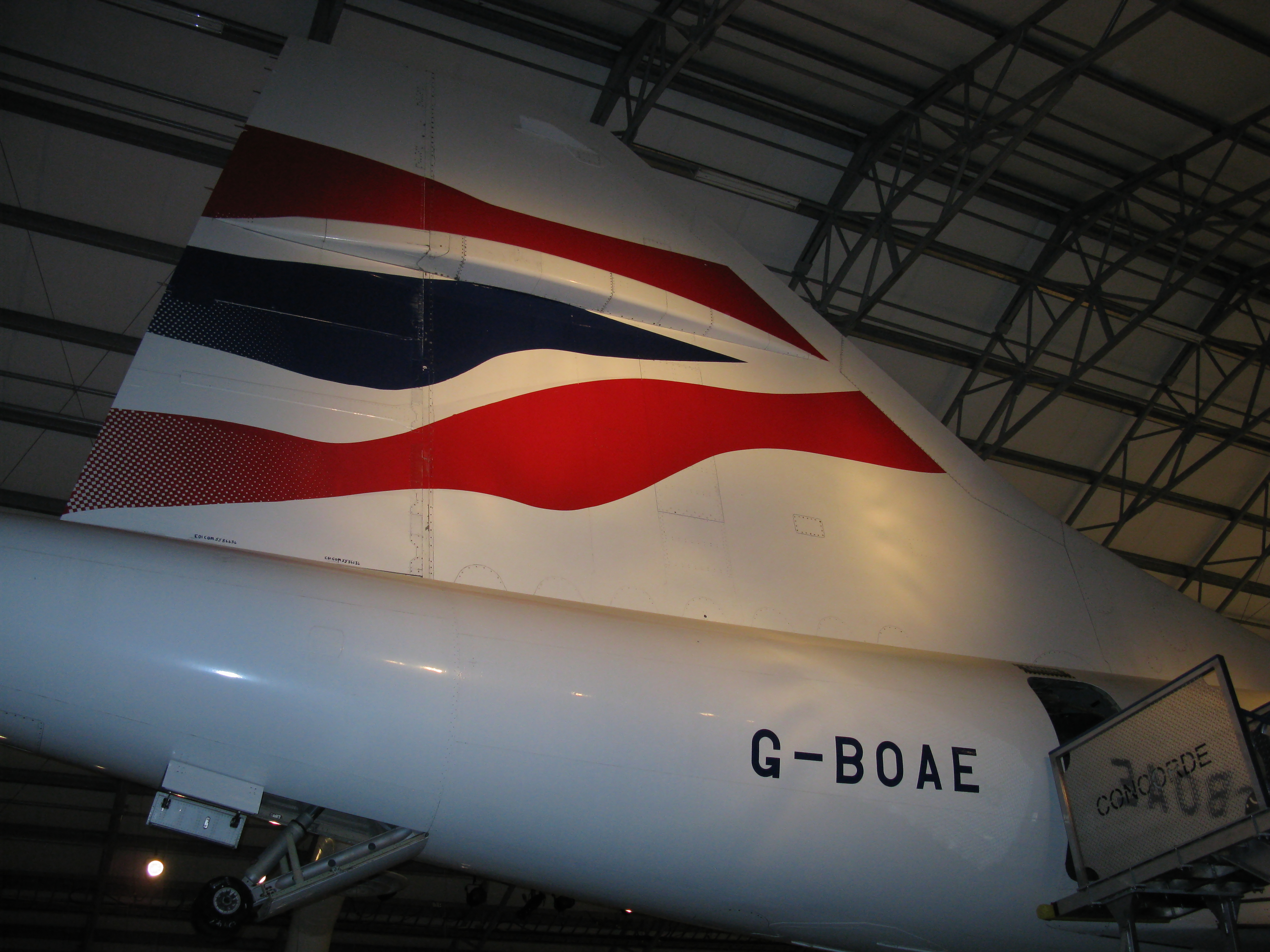
Concorde G-BOAE on display

To the east of the main Grantley Adams Airport is the old Spencers Plantation, part of the new expanded airport grounds and site of the British Airways 8,534 m^{2} (91,860 sq ft) Concorde hangar. The hangar originally featured a museum with a dedicated hall where one of the 20 retired Concorde aircraft BAC/SNIAS Concorde 212 G-BOAE is now on display as a loan to the Government of Barbados.

On 2 November 1977 G-BOAE was the same aircraft that Queen Elizabeth II traveled flying from Grantley Adams to London Heathrow, England. That occasion was the first visit by Concorde to Barbados.

The Concorde Experience closed on 1 July 2018 as a museum and in November 2024 the hangar was repurposed into a new departures terminal for sea-air passengers.

=== Runway and taxiways ===
The airport is at an elevation of 52 metres (171 ft) above mean sea level. It has a single two-mile asphalt paved runway: 09/27 measuring 11,017 by 148 feet (3,358 m × 45 m). The airport has a single east-westerly runway, connected by six taxiway intersections with the aircraft parking area which is adjacent to the main terminals. As a result of the tradewinds that blow from the Atlantic Ocean across Barbados from the east, planes usually land and take-off in an easterly direction. This results in a typical flight path for arriving aircraft along the west coast of Barbados, while departing flights usually fly along the east coast. During some weather disturbances, such as passing hurricanes or tropical systems, planes may take off or land in a westerly direction such as on 29 August 2010.

=== Navigation ===
TBPB is equipped with VOR/DME and an ILS system. The airport operates 24 hours a day, seven days a week.

== Airlines and destinations ==
=== Passenger ===
Airlines	Destinations
Air Canada	Montréal–Trudeau, Toronto–Pearson
Air Canada Rouge	Seasonal: Halifax (begins 17 December 2026)
Air Peace	Charter: Lagos
Air Transat	Seasonal: Montréal–Trudeau (begins 13 December 2026)
American Airlines	Charlotte, Miami, Philadelphia
British Airways	Georgetown–Cheddi Jagan, Grenada, London–Gatwick, London–Heathrow, Tobago
Caribbean Airlines	Antigua, Castries, Fort-de-France, Georgetown–Ogle, Grenada, Pointe-à-Pitre, Port of Spain, St. Maarten, St. Vincent–Argyle, Tobago
Condor	Frankfurt; Seasonal charter: Düsseldorf
Conviasa	Caracas
Copa Airlines	Panama City–Tocumen
Delta Air Lines	Atlanta
Discover Airlines	Seasonal: Frankfurt
InterCaribbean Airways	Antigua, Castries, Fort-de-France (begins 25 January 2027), Georgetown–Cheddi Jagan, Georgetown–Ogle, Kingston–Norman Manley, Port of Spain, Providenciales, St. Maarten, St. Vincent–Argyle, Tortola
JetBlue	Boston, New York–JFK
KLM	Seasonal: Amsterdam
Liat Air	Antigua, Castries, Georgetown–Cheddi Jagan, Grenada
Norse Atlantic Airways	Seasonal charter: London–Gatwick, Manchester
Sunrise Airways	Antigua
Surinam Airways	Paramaribo
TUI Airways	Seasonal: Birmingham, Glasgow, London–Gatwick, Manchester, Newcastle upon Tyne
United Airlines	Newark, Washington-Dulles
Virgin Atlantic	Grenada, London–Heathrow, St. Vincent–Argyle; Seasonal: Manchester
WestJet	Toronto–Pearson
Winair	Castries, Dominica–Douglas-Charles, St. Kitts, St. Maarten, Tortola

== Statistics ==
Traffic by calendar year, official ACI and GAIA statistics
	Passengers	Change from previous year	Aircraft operations	Change from previous year	Cargo (metric tons)	Change from previous year
2008	2,165,125	▲0.68%	38,986	Steady	19,479	Steady
2009	1,939,059	▼10.44%	34,454	▼11.62%	21,098	▲8.31%
2010	1,995,167	▲2.89%	35,378	▲2.68%	22,335	▲5.86%
2011	2,074,654	▲3.98%	35,452	▲0.21%	22,720	▲1.72%
2012	1,967,571	▼5.16%	34,476	▼2.75%	22,322	▼1.75%
2013	1,845,430	▼6.21%	31,670	▼8.14%	21,567	▼3.38%
2014	1,858,176	▲0.69%	30,247	▼4.49%	18,852	▼12.59%
2015	1,966,789	▲5.85%	30,508	▲0.86%	14,778	▼21.61%
2016	2,086,209	▲6.07%	30,398	▼0.36%	13,438	▼9.07%
2017	2,172,603	▲4.14%	32,352	▲6.43%	11,721	▼12.78%
2018	2,194,931	▲1.03%	33,296	▲2.92%	10,987	▼6.26%
2019	2,298,491	▲4.72%	32,854	▼1.33%	10,231	▼6.88%
2020	768,106	▼66.58%	15,326	▼53.35%	8,362	▼18.27%
2021	596,063	▼22.40%	15,148	▼1.16%	9,651	▲15.41%
2022	1,551,170	▲160.24%	25,714	▲69.75%	10,745	▲11.34%
2023	2,103,639	▲35.62%	32,278	▲25.53%	9,501	▼11.58%
2024	2,372,645	▲12.79%	40,078	▲24.17%	8,822	▼7.15%
2025	2,417,065	▲1.87%	38,950	▼2.81%	10,436	▲18.30%
Source: Airports Council International. World Airport Traffic Reports (2009, 2011, 2012, 2013, 2014) Grantley Adams International Airport (2017–present).

== Other facilities ==
The head office of the Barbados Civil Aviation Department is on the airport property. In addition Barbados Meteorological Services, operates a doppler weather radar station at the airport.

== Incidents and accidents ==
- On 6 October 1976, Cubana Flight 455 was bombed and crashed off the coast of Barbados in a terrorist attack by suspected CIA operatives shortly after the plane took off from Barbados. The plane had landed in Barbados and was en route to Havana, Cuba by Kingston, Jamaica. Persons linked to the attack and said to be hired by Luis Posada Carriles had de-planed in Barbados and made plans to fly out of the country a short time later on an alternate flight.

== Awards ==
- 1998, 1999, 2000, 2002, 2003, 2004 – The "Caribbean's Leading Airport" – by the World Travel Awards
- In 2010 Airport Council International (ACI) recognised the airport as one of the best facilities in the region for service excellence. Under the section Caribbean and Latin America, Grantley Adams Airport was ranked as third following: Guayaquil (GYE), Ecuador and Cancún (CUN), Mexico, respectively.

== See also ==
- Barbados Civil Aviation Department
- List of the busiest airports in the Caribbean
