= Barbados Civil Aviation Department =

Barabdos civil aviation agency

The Barbados Civil Aviation Authority (BCAA') has its headquarters in Charnocks, Christ Church. The Authority is headed by the Director General who is supported by the Directorate, Inspectorate and other support staff. It is governed under the Civil Aviation Act of 2022. The Authority was established to advise the Ministry of Tourism and International Transport, who is responsible for the regulation and control of all aspects of civil aviation in Barbados. BCAA cooperates with other regional authorities in the Caribbean under the bloc known as the Caribbean Aviation Safety and Security Oversight System (CASSOS)

Aircraft registered in Barbados must carry the identification mark "8P-". The Barbados Civil Aviation allows three categories for aircraft registration in the country:

- (i) the Government,
- (ii) a citizen of Barbados, or
- (iii) a body incorporated under the Companies Act, or in a Commonwealth country; or a Contracting State and having its principal place of business in Barbados, or in another Commonwealth country, or Contracting State.

== Footnotes ==
- CIVIL AVIATION BILL, 2004
- CIVIL AVIATION (AMENDMENT) ACT, 2007
- CIVIL AVIATION (AMENDMENT) Bill, 2011 – currently proposed by Parliament
