= Eastern Caribbean Civil Aviation Authority =

The Eastern Caribbean Civil Aviation Authority (ECCAA) is a civil aviation authority serving the Organisation of Eastern Caribbean States (OECS). The headquarters are in Saint John's, Antigua and Barbuda. The agency serves as the aviation accident and incident investigation authority of its jurisdiction.

== History ==
The agency originated from the Directorate of Civil Aviation - Eastern Caribbean States. The Government of the United Kingdom appointed the directorate's first director in 1957. The UK-West Indies Associated States (WIAS) Council of Ministers took responsibility for the directorate's operations in 1968. The directorate became an Organisation of Eastern Caribbean States institution when that agency was established in 1982.

In 2002, the participants in the 35th meeting of the OECS Heads of Governments declared that a self-financed, fully autonomous authority should regulate civil aviation. The OECS ministers who were responsible for civil aviation signed the agreement establishing the ECCAA in October 2003. Five OECS member states had passed the Eastern Caribbean Civil Aviation Authority Agreement Act by October 2004, causing the establishment of the ECCAA.

== Offices ==
The headquarters are in Saint John's, Antigua, Antigua and Barbuda. The ECCAA also operates outstations, which serve the other eight OECS states.

The outstations include the Anguilla Outstation at Wallblake Airport, the Antigua Outstation at V.C. Bird International Airport, the BVI Outstation at Terrance B. Lettsome Airport, the Dominica Outstation at Melville Hall Airport, the George Charles Outstation at George F. L. Charles Airport in Saint Lucia, the Grenada Outstation at Maurice Bishop International Airport, the Hewanorra Outstation at Hewanorra International Airport in Saint Lucia, the St. Kitts Outstation at Robert L. Bradshaw International Airport, and the St. Vincent Outstation at Argyle International Airport.
