= Douglas–Charles Airport =

Airport in Dominica

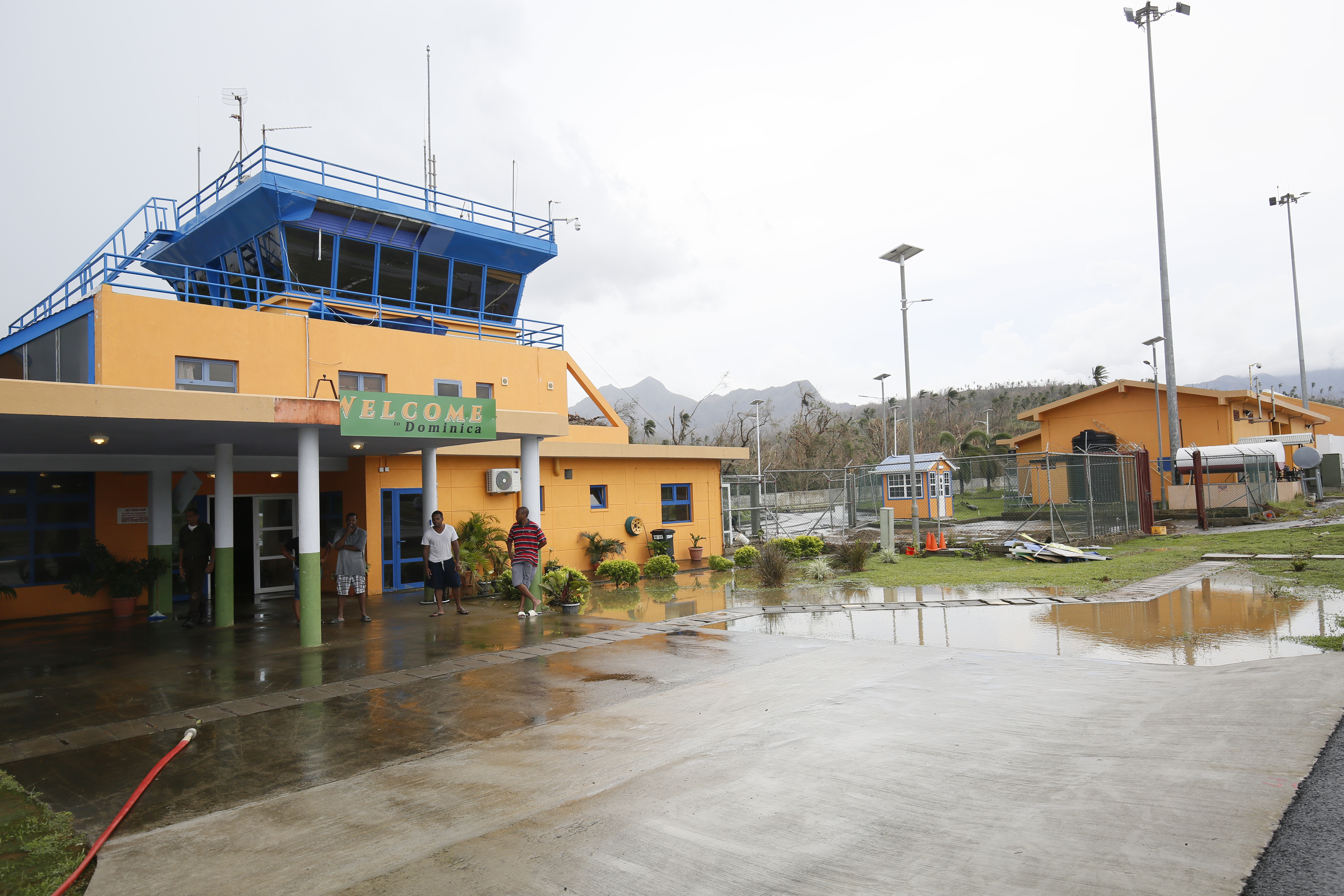
- IATA: DOM; ICAO: TDPD

Summary
- Airport type: Public
- Owner: Government of Dominica
- Operator: Dominica Air & Sea Ports Authority
- Serves: Marigot and Roseau.
- Location: Dominica
- Elevation AMSL: 73 ft (22 m)
- Coordinates: 15°32′49″N 061°18′00″W
- Website: www.domports.daspa.dm/index.php/airports/douglas-charles-airport/

Map
- Location in Dominica

Runways
Direction	Length		Surface
Direction	m	ft	Surface
09/27	1,936	6,352	Asphalt
- Source: WAD Google Maps SkyVector DominicaNewsOnline

Douglas–Charles Airport (IATA: DOM, ICAO: TDPD), formerly known as Melville Hall Airport, is an airport located on the northeast coast of Dominica, 2 mi (3.2 km) northwest of Marigot. It is about one hour away from the second largest city Portsmouth. It is one of only two airports in the island nation of Dominica, the other being Canefield Airport located three miles (5 km) northeast of Roseau.

== History ==
The Melville Hall area was chosen as the site for Dominica's main airport in 1944, for it was the only place on the island with extensive flat land. It was only after the completion of the Cross-Country Roadway connection from Belles to Marigot, in 1958, that work on the airport began. The facility opened on 22 November 1961, and was first served by Douglas DC-3 Dakotas operated by BWIA.

Three airlines were operating scheduled passenger service with turboprop aircraft into the airport in late 1979 including Leeward Islands Air Transport (LIAT) with Hawker Siddeley HS 748 flights nonstop from Antigua, Fort de France, Pointe a Pitre and St. Lucia as well as direct, no change of plane HS 748 flights from Barbados, Grenada, Port of Spain and St. Vincent; Air Martinique with nonstop Fokker F27 service from Fort de France; and Air Guadeloupe with nonstop de Havilland Canada DHC-6 Twin Otter service from Pointe a Pitre.

=== Historical jetliner service ===
According to the Official Airline Guide (OAG), two airlines were operating scheduled passenger jet service into the Melville Hall Airport in the spring of 1995: Carib Express with nonstop British Aerospace BAe 146-100 jet flights from Barbados, St. Kitts and St. Lucia; and Liberty Airlines with nonstop Boeing 727-200 jet service to St. Kitts and St. Lucia as well as direct, one stop 727 service to Fort Lauderdale. The OAG also lists scheduled passenger service at this same time flown by LIAT into the airport with de Havilland Canada DHC-8 Dash 8 turboprops nonstop from Antigua, Fort de France, Pointe a Pitre, and St. Maarten as well as direct, no change of plane Dash 8 flights from Anguilla, Port of Spain, St. Lucia, San Juan, PR and Tortola.

=== Airport expansion ===
In 2006 an airport expansion and upgrade program began which entailed the expansion of the terminal building to include a new departure lounge, customs and immigration section, and check-in area. The runway and apron were also extended and new night landing and navigational aids were installed. These enhancements had an extended completion date of mid-2010.

The first-ever night landing was conducted on 9 August 2010 by Winair. Regular night landings at the airport began on 20 September 2010; the first flight, from LIAT, flew from V.C. Bird International Airport in Antigua.

=== Renaming of airport ===
The airport was renamed from Melville Hall Airport to Douglas–Charles Airport on 27 October 2014 in honour of Prime Ministers Rosie Douglas and Pierre Charles.

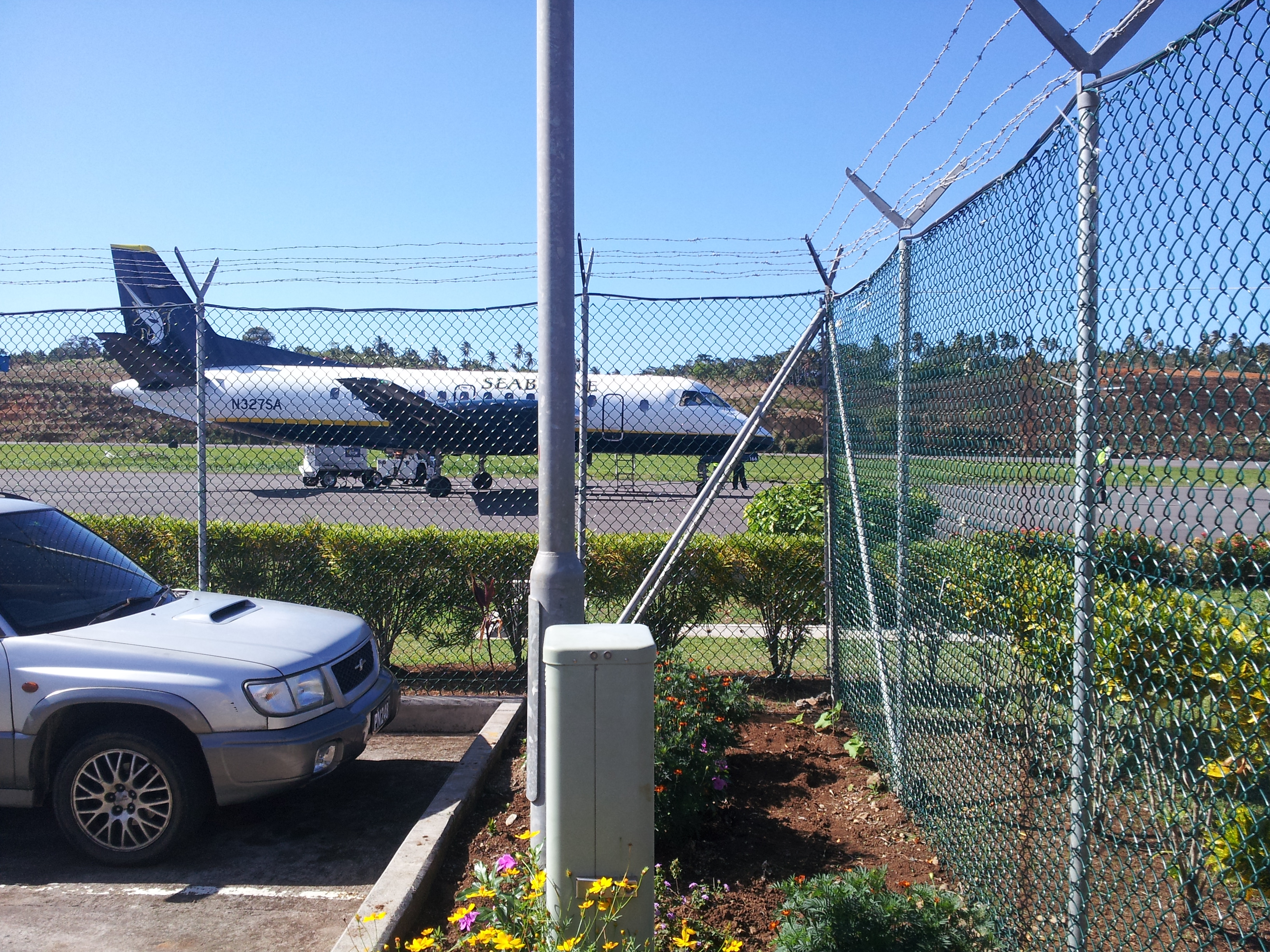
Douglas-Charles Airport

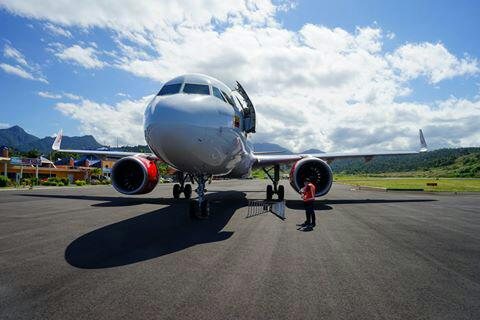
Avianca Airbus A320neo

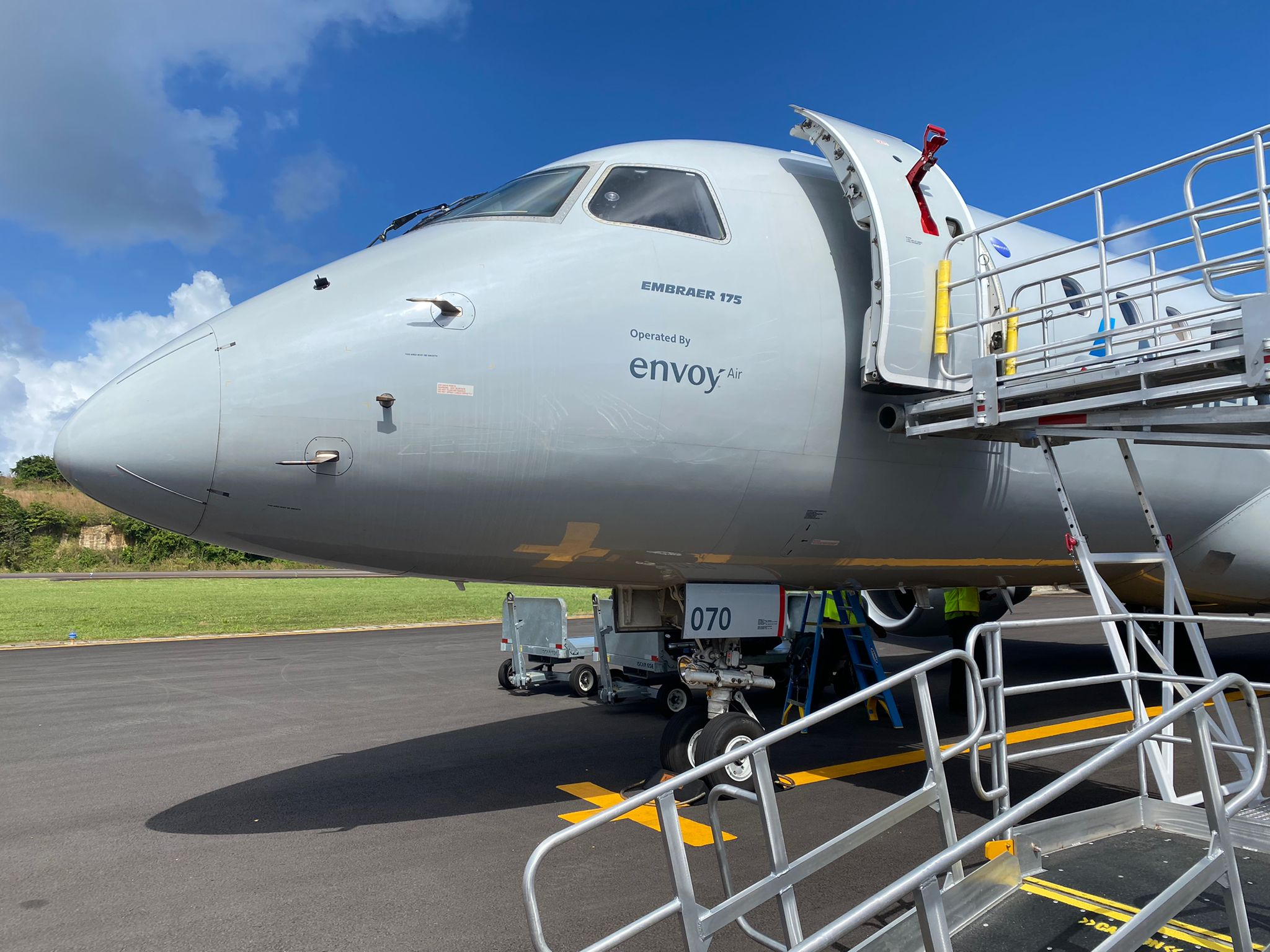
American Eagle at Ground-Level Gate 1.

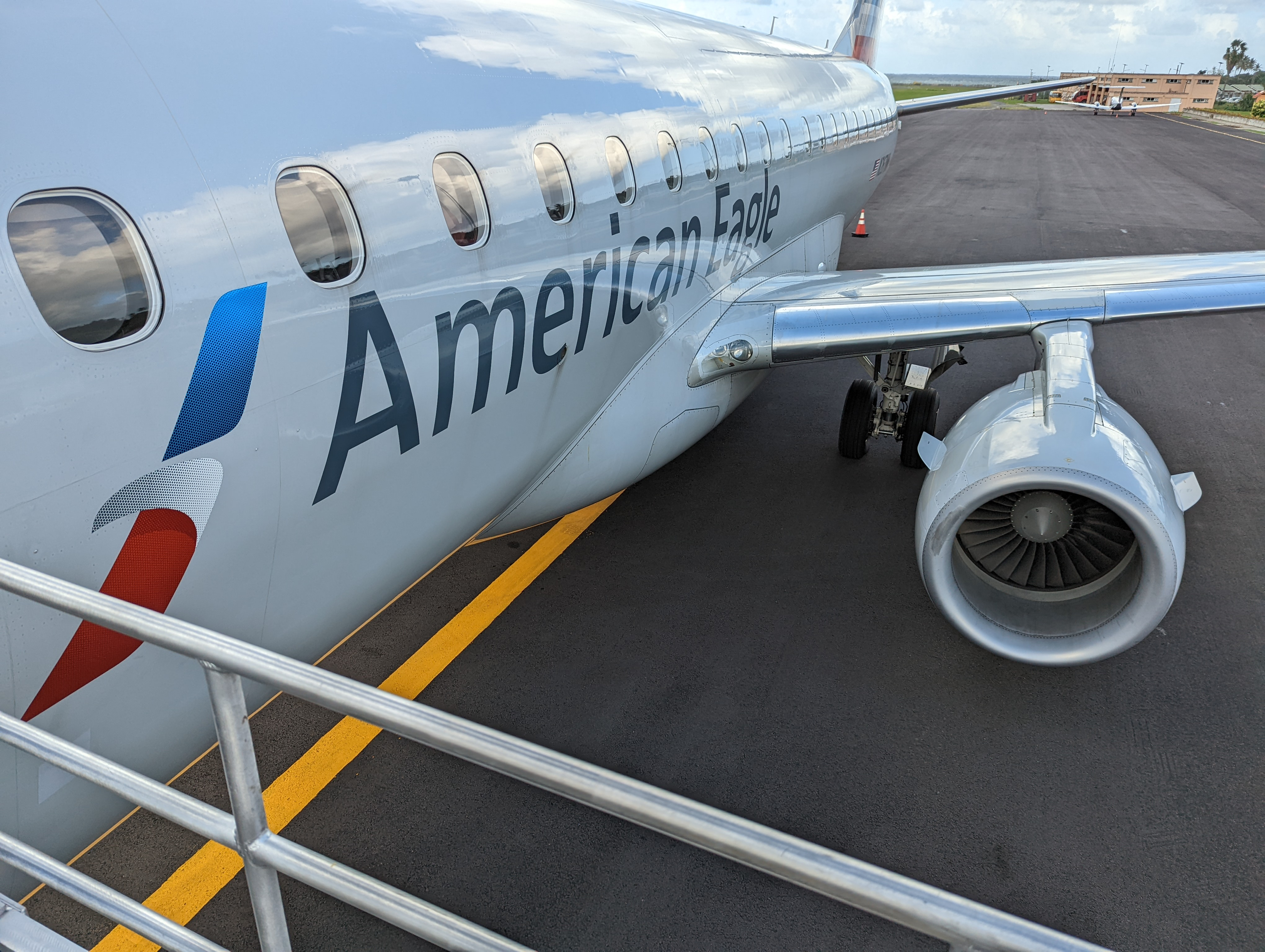
Deplaning AA at Gate 1.

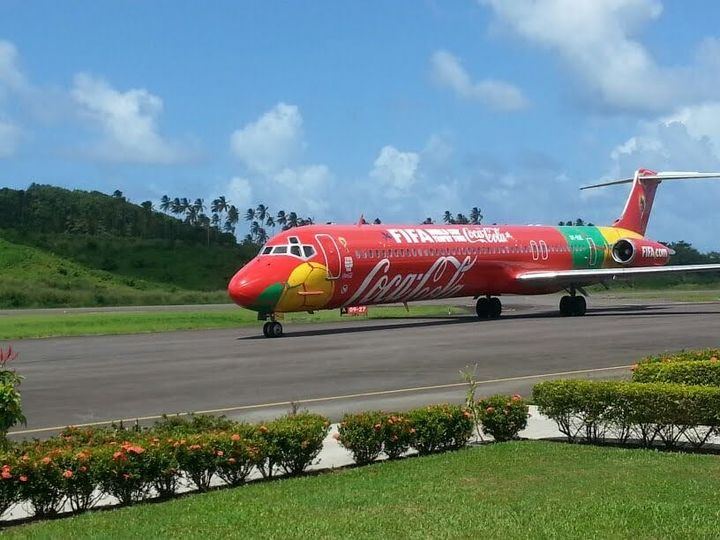
MD80 at the Douglas Charles Airport

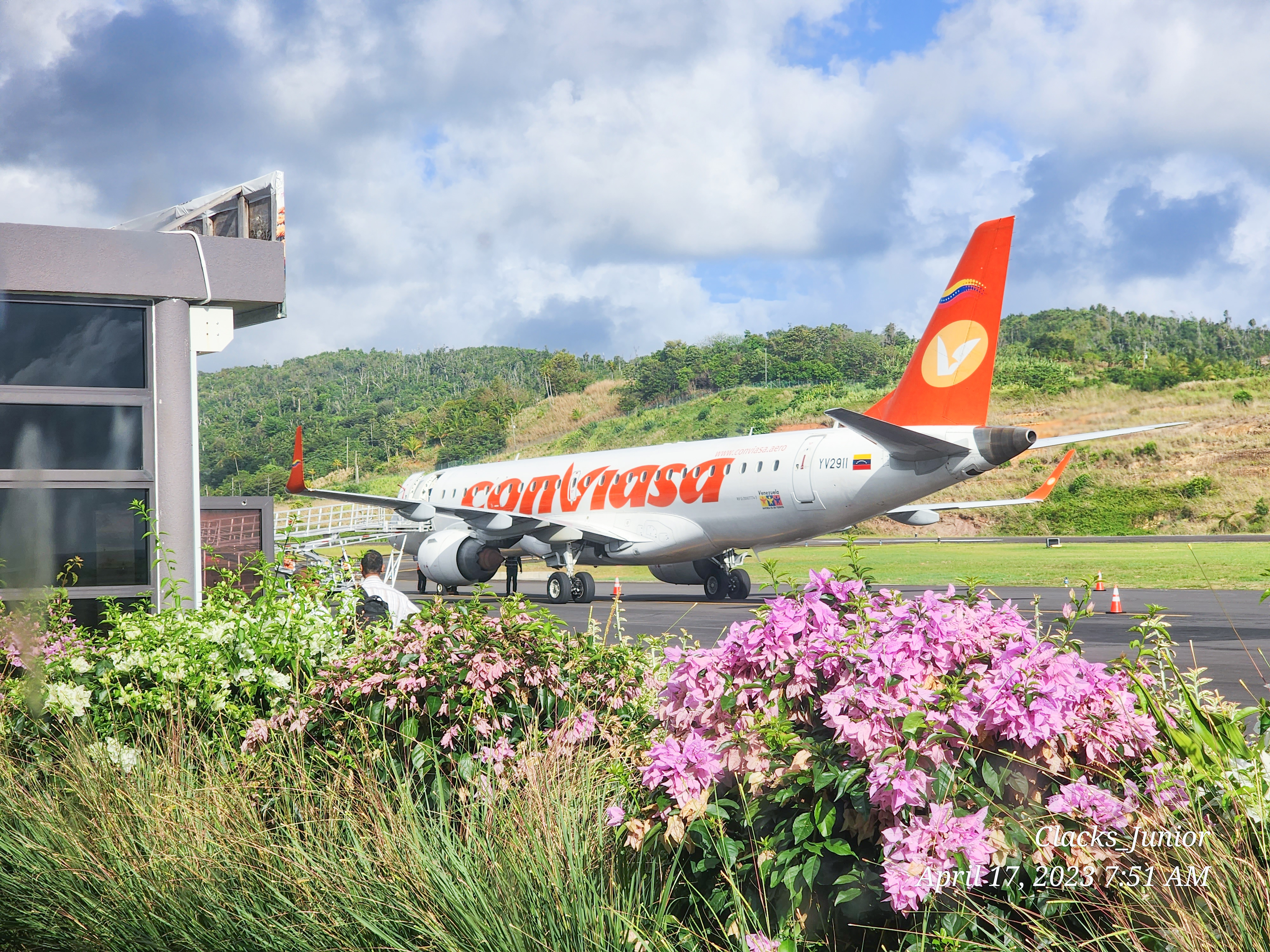
A Conviasa Embraer E190AR at the Douglas Charles Airport.

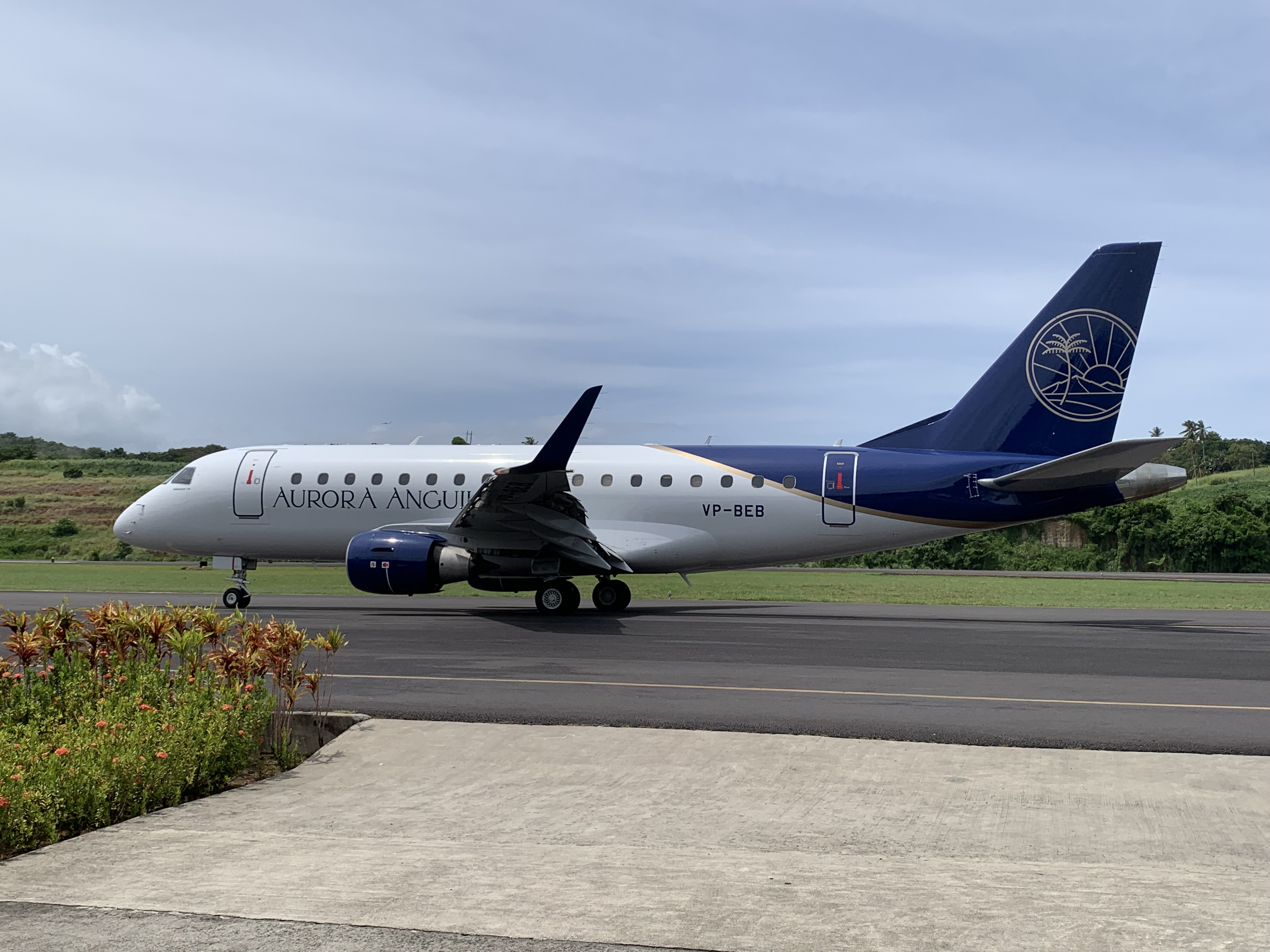
The first Embraer E170LR visit to Dominica.

== Commercial jetliner service ==
On 22 July 2021, American Airlines announced a new, twice-weekly nonstop jet service between Miami and Dominica, which began on 8 December 2021. The service is operated by its American Eagle affiliate with an Embraer 175. This marked the first non-stop commercial service between the mainland United States and Dominica. The initial service operated twice weekly until 10 January 2022, when it increased to thrice weekly. As of 5 April 2022, flights now operate once daily. American Eagle is currently the largest airline at the airport. As of 16 August 2022, the government is in reported talks with American Airlines to increase frequencies to the airport with an extra daily service (Weekends, Mondays, and Wednesdays) from Miami.

On September 27, 2024, United Airlines announced a new once-weekly nonstop service between Newark, New Jersey and Dominica. The flight commenced on February 15, 2025 with Boeing 737-700 aircraft. The airline is the first ever in the airport's history to operate this Boeing jet type commercially into the airfield.

American Eagle is now the largest air carrier to serve the airport, with a 36% market share.

- Air Century operates chartered services with the CRJ 200 from San Juan and Santo Domingo–La Isabela.
- Conviasa operates chartered flights from Caracas with their Embraer E190 aircraft.
- Fly All Ways operates chartered services with the Fokker 70 to Curaçao and Paramaribo.
- InterCaribbean Airways operates chartered services with the Embraer 145 to various destinations in the Caribbean region.
- Sunrise Airways operates chartered services with the Embraer 145 to Port-au-Prince, and Santo Domingo–La Isabela.

Government discussions with other airlines

As of 2021, the government of Dominica was (reportedly) in talks with various airlines—including Air Canada, Delta Air Lines, JetBlue, and United Airlines—for new service options to Canada and the northeastern United States.

In 2024, United Airlines announced plans to fly to Dominica with seasonal scheduled service beginning in February 2025 following these discussions.

=== Airliner visits ===
On 22 May 1989, a BAe 146 jet flown by Dan Gurney, BAe test pilot, and William Rosquist, BAe 146 Chief Pilot for Aspen Airways, made the first commercial jet landing at Douglas Charles Airport during a BAe 146 sales tour of the Lesser Antilles. On 4 April 2020, an Avianca Airbus A320neo arrived at the airport with medical supplies and equipment from Paramaribo. After offloading the cargo, the aircraft left shortly after for Bogotá. The aircraft was the largest civil passenger airliner to ever land at the airport at the time.

The airport has also handled other airliners and cargo aircraft of similar sizes in the past.

On Monday, 14 October 2013, a McDonnell Douglas MD-80 operated by Danish Air Transport in collaboration with Coca-Cola arrived on the island, carrying the FIFA World Cup Trophy.

On Saturday, 2 November 2019, a United States Air Force Boeing C-17 Globemaster III arrived with cargo and other humanitarian equipment.

Amerijet was once a frequent operator at the airport with its Boeing 727-200F, until the airline retired the type in 2018.

On Monday, 17 April 2023, Conviasa operated chartered flights from Caracas with their Embraer E190 aircraft (YV2911 & YV2912) for the Alba Games in Venezuela. This marked the first time an Embraer E190 aircraft arrived at the airport.

On Saturday, 9 September 2023, one of Aurora Anguilla Resort & Gulf Club's Embraer E170 aircraft arrived at the airport as a Men's Senior Football team charter. The team headed to Turks and Caicos to compete in various sporting events. This was the first time an Embraer 170 aircraft arrived at the airport.

=== Upcoming new airlines ===
Based on a recent report as of 16 August 2022, Venezuelan-based charter airline Sasca (in cooperation with Barbados' Executive Air and Blue Star), will soon begin operating flights in the Eastern Caribbean between Dominica and Barbados, Grenada, St.Lucia, and St. Vincent and the Grenadines. The flights will be operated by Jetstream 31 and Jetstream 32 aircraft.

== Facilities ==
=== Passenger terminal ===
The Passenger Terminal at the airport houses 10 airline check-in counters, the arrivals and departures area, and 2 Gates. Recently, there was an addition made to the terminal, which added an Executive Lounge that all arriving and departing passengers can utilize. The lounge is full of comforts and services at Douglas Charles Airport of Dominica. Lounge Seating, Complimentary Wi-Fi, Newspaper/ Magazine, Tourism Information and Bookings, Flight Monitors, Cultural Exhibits, Complimentary beverages, Complimentary snacks, Private Rest Rooms, Personalized Meet and Greets, Baggage Assistance, Assisted Immigration and Customs, and Taxi Arrangements. The lounge has many offerings and 3 categories of arrival and departure services. These include:

An In-Lounge Service:

- A La Carte In Lounge services: Reserved Seating/Service area, Conference/Meeting Room, and a Complimentary Local Call.

Arrival Services

- Concierge Arrival Services: Personalized Meet & Greet, Baggage Assistance, Taxi Arrangements, and Assisted Immigration & Customs.
- A La Carte Arrival Services: Personalized Meet & Greet, Baggage Assistance, Assisted Immigration & Customs, and Taxi Arrangements.

Departure Services

- Basic: Lounge Security Screening, Boarding Announcements, Airside Access to the Departure Gate.
- Concierge Departure Services: Baggage Assistance, Check-in Assistance, Lounge Security Screening, Boarding Announcements, and Plane Boarding Assistance.
- A La Carte Departure Services: Baggage Assistance, Check-in Assistance, and Plane Boarding Assistance.

=== Passenger gates ===
With the recent commencement of service to Miami operated by American Airlines, a ground-level Passenger gate system was implemented.

- The terminal currently has two ground-level gates.

Airlines and their respective gates are as follows:

- Ground-level (Gate 1) - American Eagle, American Airlines.
- Ground-level (Gate 2)—On Saturdays, United Airlines is the sole user of Ground-Level (Gate 2). Depending on the ramp's available spacing and time of arrival, American Eagle sometimes utilizes Gate 2 as well as Liat20.
- All other turboprop airliners are remotely parked at various non-gated areas on the apron.

=== Terminal Gates ===
- (Gate 1 - Airport terminal) - American Eagle, American Airlines.
- (Gate 2 - Airport terminal) - Caribbean Airlines, InterCaribbean Airways, Liat20, Silver Airways, and Sunrise Airways.
- (Gate 3 - Airport terminal) - United Airlines

== Runways and taxiways ==
The airport features one 6,352-foot runway. Runway 09 has a 1,749-foot Displaced Threshold due to the rising terrain to the west of the airport, with an available landing distance of 4,603 feet. It's only authorized for visual approaches, and landings at night are prohibited. Runway 27 departures are prohibited.

- Runway 09 - Visual Approach - HIRL available
- Runway 27 - RNAV Approach - HIRL available - SALS - Has a (PAPI) Precision approach path indicator System at (angle 3.00°)

Number	Length	Width	Notes
09/27	6,352 feet (1,936 m)	148 feet (45 m)	Equipped with Night Landing Instrumentation

=== Runway extension ===
The Minister of Tourism announced Thursday, 11 May 2023, that the Runway at the Dominica Douglas Charles Airport will be extended. Runway 09 will extend further into the valley to accommodate larger passenger aircraft and a higher Takeoff Weight by the existing Envoy Air service. The extension will be about (180 m) = (+/- 590 ft). The current runway length will be extended from (1756 m - 5761 ft) to (1936 m - 6352 ft). The project is expected to be completed 3 months (November 2023) from the commencement date (August 2023).

The runway extension project has been completed with a final length of 6,352 ft. The runway extension project at the Douglas Charles Airport was completed last week, extending the previous facility from 180 meters. This marks a significant achievement for Dominica's aviation industry through improved access and enhanced facilities. The project which was launched last year aimed at extending the 1756 metres long runway to 1936 metres. The runway is said to be built with stronger and more resilient material, aiding improved flow and providing a safe landing for the aircraft during wet weather conditions.

== Airlines and destinations ==
=== Passenger services ===
Airlines	Destinations	Refs
American Eagle	Miami	
Contour Airlines	Port of Spain, Saint Thomas, San Juan	
InterCaribbean Airways	Barbados, Castries, Tortola	
Liat Air	Antigua, Barbados, Castries, Punta Cana, Saint Kitts, Sint Maarten, Tortola	
Sunrise Airways	Antigua, Barbados, Castries, Pointe-à-Pitre, Saint Kitts, Sint Maarten, Tortola	
United Airlines	Seasonal: Newark	
Winair	Antigua, Barbados, Sint Maarten	

- American Eagle, Contour Airlines and Liat20 operate regional jets; either Embraer E-Jets or Embraer ERJ Family jets. These carriers are currently the only operators serving the airport with commercial regional jetliners. On February 15, 2025, United Airlines became the first commercial passenger air carrier to serve the airport with mainline jet aircraft on a regularly scheduled basis with Boeing 737-700 aircraft. Beginning December 17th, 2026, American Airlines will be the second commercial passenger air carrier to serve the airport with mainline aircraft. The airline will operate Airbus A319 aircraft on its Miami to Dominica route.
- United Airlines made history on February 15, 2025, with the inauguration of commercial services from Newark using Boeing 737-700 aircraft. The airline is the first in the airport's history to operate the Boeing 737-700 into Dominica with nonstop flights to the New Jersey | New York City area via Newark Airport.
- Friday, December 13, 2024, the Prime Minister, the Honorable Roosevelt Skerrit during an End-of-Year Press Conference, stated that the Government is in discussions with an undisclosed airline for a non-stop flight between Dominica and the John F Kennedy International Airport, New York to commence in 2025. It is rumored that JetBlue will operate Airbus A320 aircraft.
- Dominica will become an Eastern Caribbean Regional hub for Sunrise Airways expansion operations in the coming months.
- Dominica Secures Additional United Airlines Flight from New Jersey. United Airlines will introduce a second weekly direct flight from Newark Liberty International Airport (EWR) to Douglas–Charles Airport (DOM). The expected dates are October 19, 2025, to April 26, 2026, and October 17, 2026, to April 24, 2027, as stated by the Minister for Finance, Economic Development, Climate Resilience and Social Security, Hon. Dr. Irving McIntyre.
- Wednesday, August 27, 2025, Tennessee based carrier Contour Airlines announced the start of their first-ever expansion into the Caribbean. Commencing September 24 and 25, 2025, respectively, the airline will connect Saint Thomas, U.S. Virgin Islands and San Juan, Puerto Rico to Dominica with Embraer ERJ-135 regional jet flights. "This historic milestone marks Contour’s official entry into the Caribbean market, expanding travel opportunities and improving accessibility for residents and visitors across Dominica, San Juan, and St. Thomas". When the Contour service began, it marked the third U.S. based airline to fly to the island.
- From December 17th, 2026 through January 5th, 2027 and February 11th through April 5th, 2027 (Winter Seasonal), American Airlines will be operating Airbus A319 aircraft on their Miami to Dominica route. This was announced publicly by Dominica News Online on September 4th, 2026. This will mark the first time that the airline has operated Mainline flights, as well as the first scheduled Airbus A319 flights to the island.

=== Cargo services ===
Airlines	Destinations	Refs
Air Cargo Carriers	Antigua, Barbados, Castries, Grenada, Saint Kitts, Saint Lucia–Hewanorra, Saint Thomas, Saint Vincent–Argyle, San Juan, Sint Maarten, Tortola	
Air Flamenco	San Juan	
Ameriflight	Antigua, Saint Kitts, San Juan	
DHL Aviation	Antigua, Castries, Fort-de-France, Pointe-à-Pitre, Port of Spain, Saint Vincent–Argyle, San Juan	
FedEx Feeder	Antigua, Saint Kitts, San Juan	
IBC Airways	Seasonal: Aguadilla	

== Statistics ==
=== Top destinations ===
Busiest international and Regional flights out of Douglas Charles Airport by frequency as of 2024
Rank	Destinations (operated by)	Frequency (weekly)	Carriers
1	Antigua and Barbuda	16	Liat20, Sunrise Airways
2	Saint Lucia	16	InterCaribbean Airways, Liat20, Sunrise Airways
3	St. Kitts and Nevis	15	Liat20, Sunrise Airways
4	Barbados	12	Caribbean Airlines, InterCaribbean Airways, Liat20
5	Puerto Rico	6	Silver Airways
6	Sint Maarten	5	Winair
7	Tortola	3	InterCaribbean Airways
8	Trinidad and Tobago	3	Caribbean Airlines
9	Martinique	2	Winair
10	Miami	2	American Eagle

== Incidents and accidents ==
- An Air Anguilla Cessna 402 impacted terrain west of the airport, killing all 11 on board, on 23 August 1998.

== Other facilities ==
The airport houses the Dominica Outstation of the Eastern Caribbean Civil Aviation Authority.

== Navigation ==
The airport offers an RNAV approach only on Runway 27. Landings on Runway 09 are strictly visual.

== See also ==
- Transport in Dominica
- List of airports in Dominica
