= George F. L. Charles Airport =

Airport in Saint Lucia

George F. L. Charles Airport Aéroport George F. L. Charles
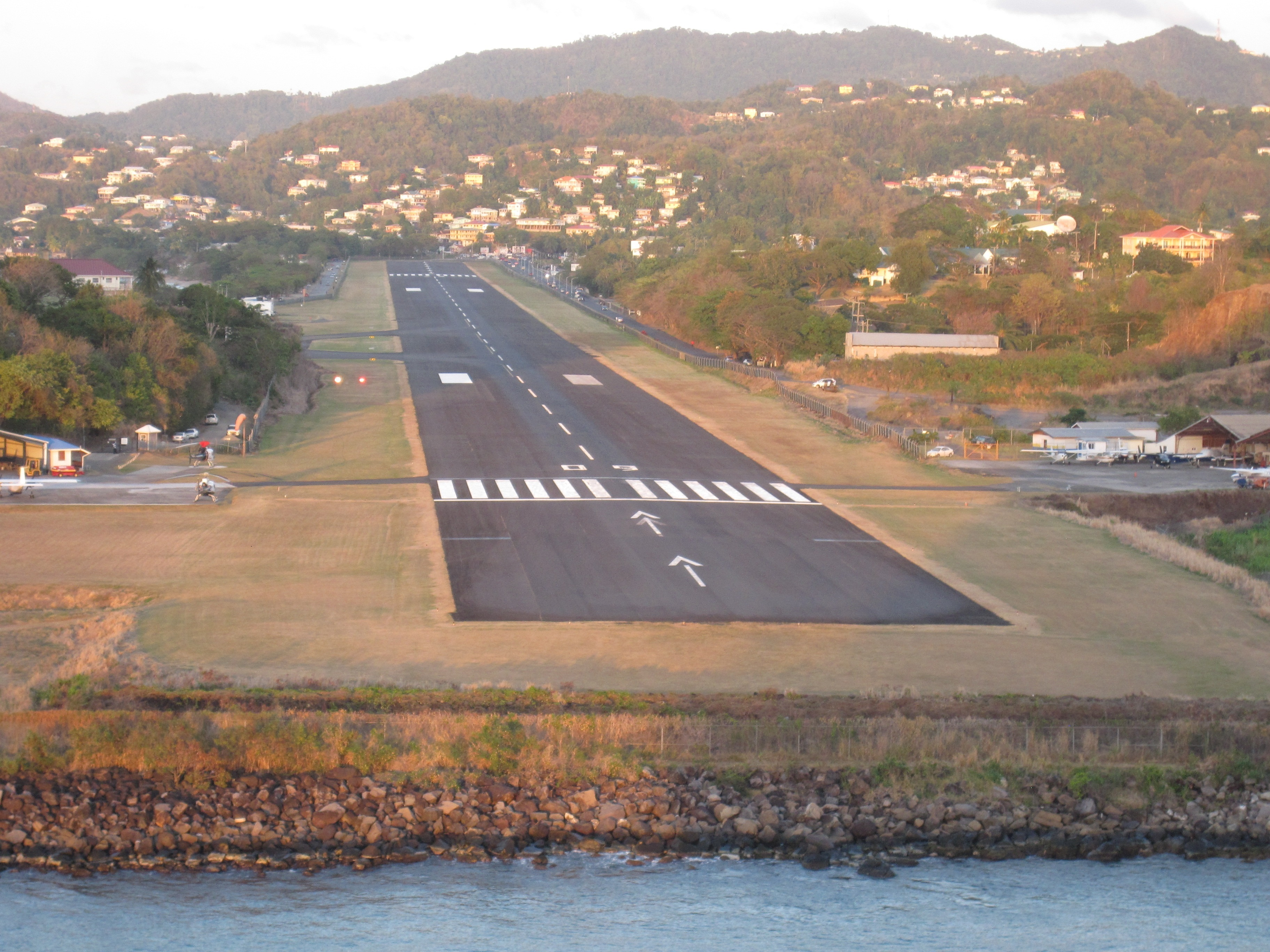
- IATA: SLU; ICAO: TLPC; WMO: 78947

Summary
- Airport type: Public
- Owner: Government of Saint Lucia
- Operator: Saint Lucia Air & Sea Ports Authority
- Serves: Castries, Saint Lucia
- Location: Vigie, Castries
- Opened: 1941; 85 years ago
- Hub for: Wiggins Airways
- Time zone: AST (UTC−04:00)
- Elevation AMSL: 22 ft (6.7 m)
- Coordinates: 14°01′13″N 060°59′35″W
- Website: http://www.stlucia-airport.com/

Map
- Location in Saint Lucia

Runways
Direction	Length		Surface
Direction	m	ft	Surface
09/27	1,898	6,227	Asphalt

Helipads
Number	Length		Surface
Number	m	ft	Surface
H1	16	60	Asphalt

Statistics (2016)
- Passengers: 195,859
- Passenger change 15–16: ▲1.2%
- Aircraft movements: 17,569
- Movements change 15–16: ▲2.51%
- Source: DAFIF 2012 SLASPA Statistics

George F. L. Charles Airport (commonly known as Vigie Airport) (IATA: SLU, ICAO: TLPC) is the smaller of the two airports in Saint Lucia, the other being Hewanorra International Airport. It is located 2 km (1.2 mi) north of Castries, the capital city. George F. L. Charles Airport is managed by the Saint Lucia Air and Seaports Authority (SLASPA). Its runway runs parallel to a pristine beach, Vigie Beach, which is a popular tourist attraction.

== Historical airline service ==
British West Indies Airways (BWIA) was serving Vigie Field (which was the previous name of the airport) as early as 1950 with flights operated one or more days of the week to Barbados, Grenada, Port of Spain, Trinidad, Martinique, Guadeloupe, Antigua and St. Kitts operated with Lockheed Lodestar prop aircraft. By 1965, BWIA was operating daily flights into the airport with Vickers Viscount turboprop airliners on a round trip routing of Port of Spain - Grenada - Barbados - St. Lucia - Martinique - Guadeloupe - Antigua. The same year, Leeward Islands Air Transport was operating a round trip flight six days a week on a routing of Antigua - Guadeloupe - Dominica - Martinique - St. Lucia - St. Vincent with Hawker Siddeley HS 748 turboprop aircraft. By the summer of 2001, American Eagle was operating six daily flights from the airport nonstop to San Juan on behalf of American Airlines via a code sharing agreement with these services being flown by San Juan-based Executive Airlines with ATR-42 and ATR-72 turboprop aircraft.

== Renaming of airport ==
The airport was renamed on 4 August 1997 in honour of Saint Lucia politician Sir George Frederick Lawrence Charles (1916–2004). The airport had previously been known as Vigie Field.

== Traffic ==
On average, George F. L. Charles Airport handles 32,000 flights per year carrying 394,000 passengers. Most of these flights operate with turboprop aircraft such as the ATR 72-500 or the de Havilland Canada DHC-8 Dash 8.

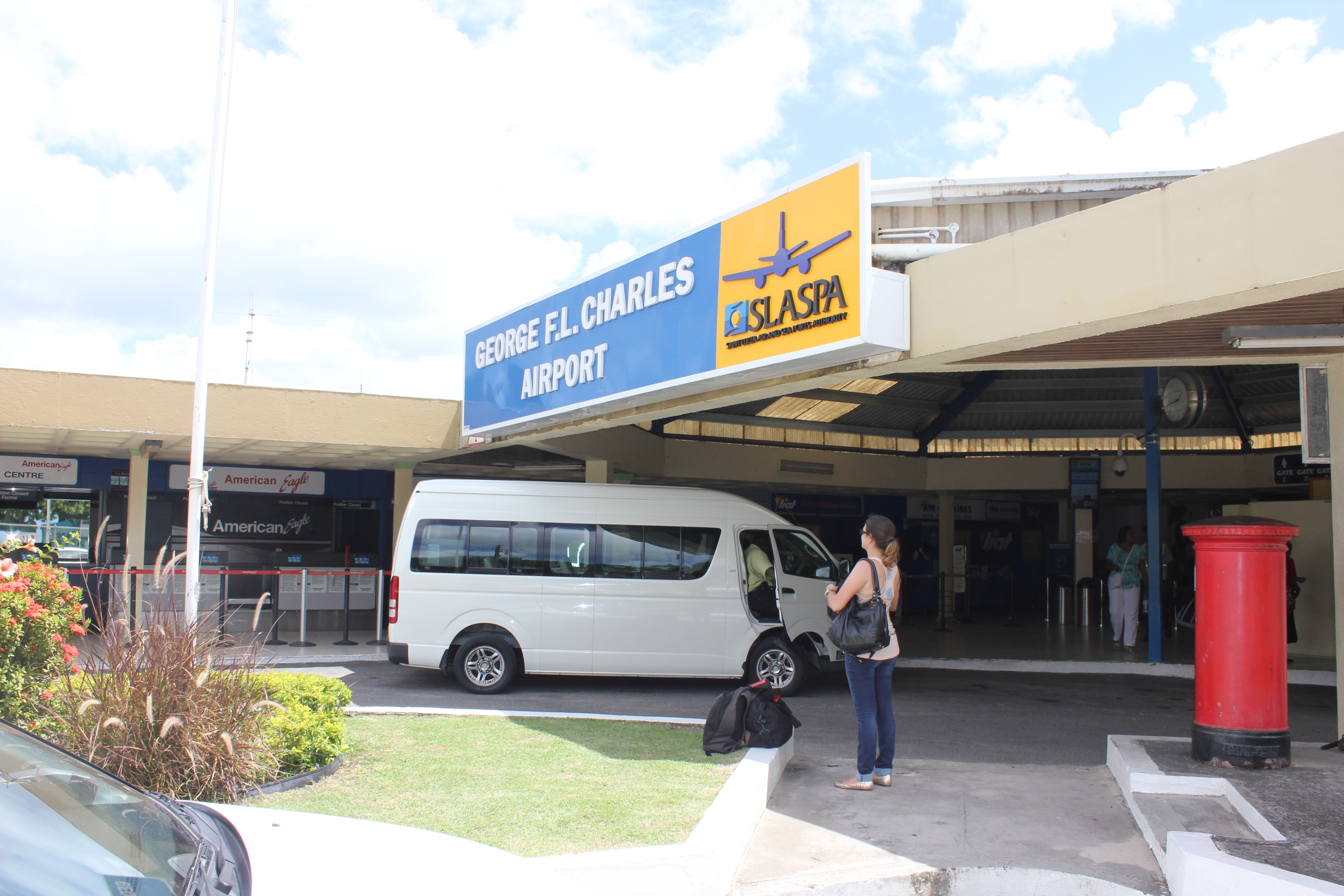
George F. L. Charles Airport entrance

The airport currently has no scheduled jet service. All jet services into St. Lucia, including transatlantic flights, operate at the present time via Hewanorra International Airport, located on the southeast portion of the island.

== Previous jet service ==
The airport previously had scheduled passenger jet service flown by Caribair which in 1968 was operating McDonnell Douglas DC-9-30 jetliners on a daily basis with nonstop flights to Antigua and Barbados with direct jet service to Port of Spain, Trinidad, St. Maarten, San Juan, Puerto Rico, St. Croix and St. Thomas. In 1973, Leeward Islands Air Transport (LIAT) was operating stretched British Aircraft Corporation BAC One-Eleven series 500 twin jets on nonstop flights to Antigua, Barbados and Fort-de-France, Martinique as well as direct, no change of plane jet service with the BAC One-Eleven to Port of Spain, Trinidad, St. Maarten and San Juan, Puerto Rico. In 1995, Carib Express was operating British Aerospace BAe 146-100 jet flights into the airport nonstop from Barbados, Dominica and St. Vincent as well as one stop BAe 146 service from Port of Spain and St. Kitts. Another previous jet operator was BWIA West Indies Airways (operating as BWIA International at the time) which in 1996 was operating McDonnell Douglas MD-80 jetliners between the airport and Miami twice a week and also twice a week between the airport and New York JFK Airport with both of these direct, no change of plane flights making an intermediate stop in Antigua as well as flying MD-80 service several days a week nonstop to Barbados with these flights then continuing on to Port of Spain.

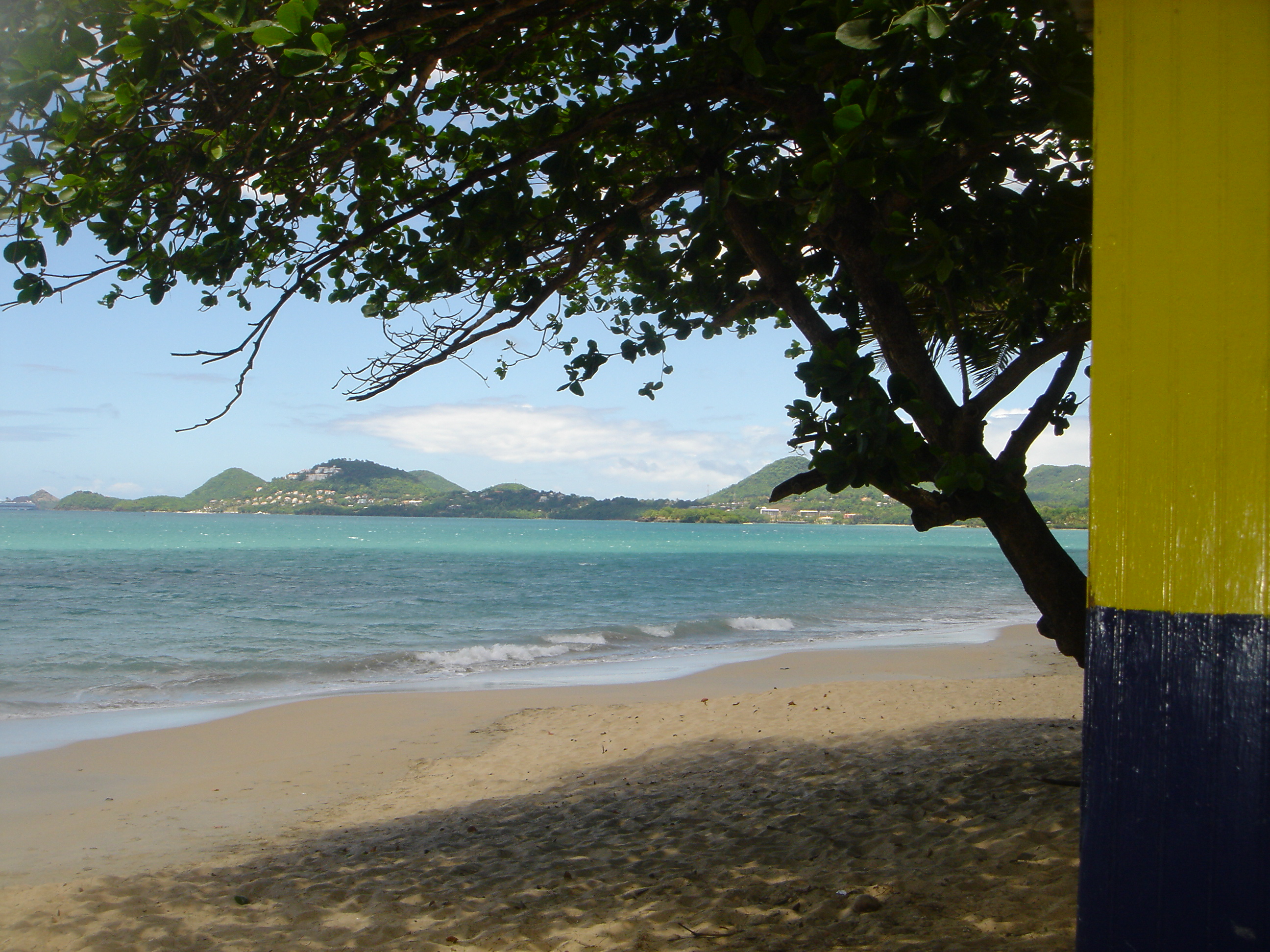
Vigie Beach, immediately opposite the airport check-in and departure lounge area

== Airlines and destinations ==
=== Passenger ===
Airlines	Destinations	Refs
Caribbean Airlines	Barbados, Pointe-à-Pitre, Port of Spain, St. Vincent–Argyle	
InterCaribbean Airways	Barbados, Dominica–Douglas-Charles, St. Vincent–Argyle	
LIAT20	Antigua, Barbados, Grenada	
Sunrise Airways	Antigua, Barbados, Dominica–Douglas-Charles, Fort-de-France, Grenada, St. Vincent–Argyle	
Air Adelphi	Fort-de-France, St. Vincent–Argyle	
Winair	Barbados, Dominica–Douglas-Charles, St. Maarten, St. Vincent–Argyle	

=== Cargo ===
Airlines	Destinations	Refs
Air Cargo Carriers	Dominica–Douglas-Charles, St. Kitts, St. Vincent–Argyle	
Ameriflight	Aguadilla, San Juan	
DHL Aviation	Fort-de-France, Grenada, St. Vincent–Argyle	
FedEx Feeder	Aguadilla, Fort-de-France, Grenada, St. Vincent–Argyle	

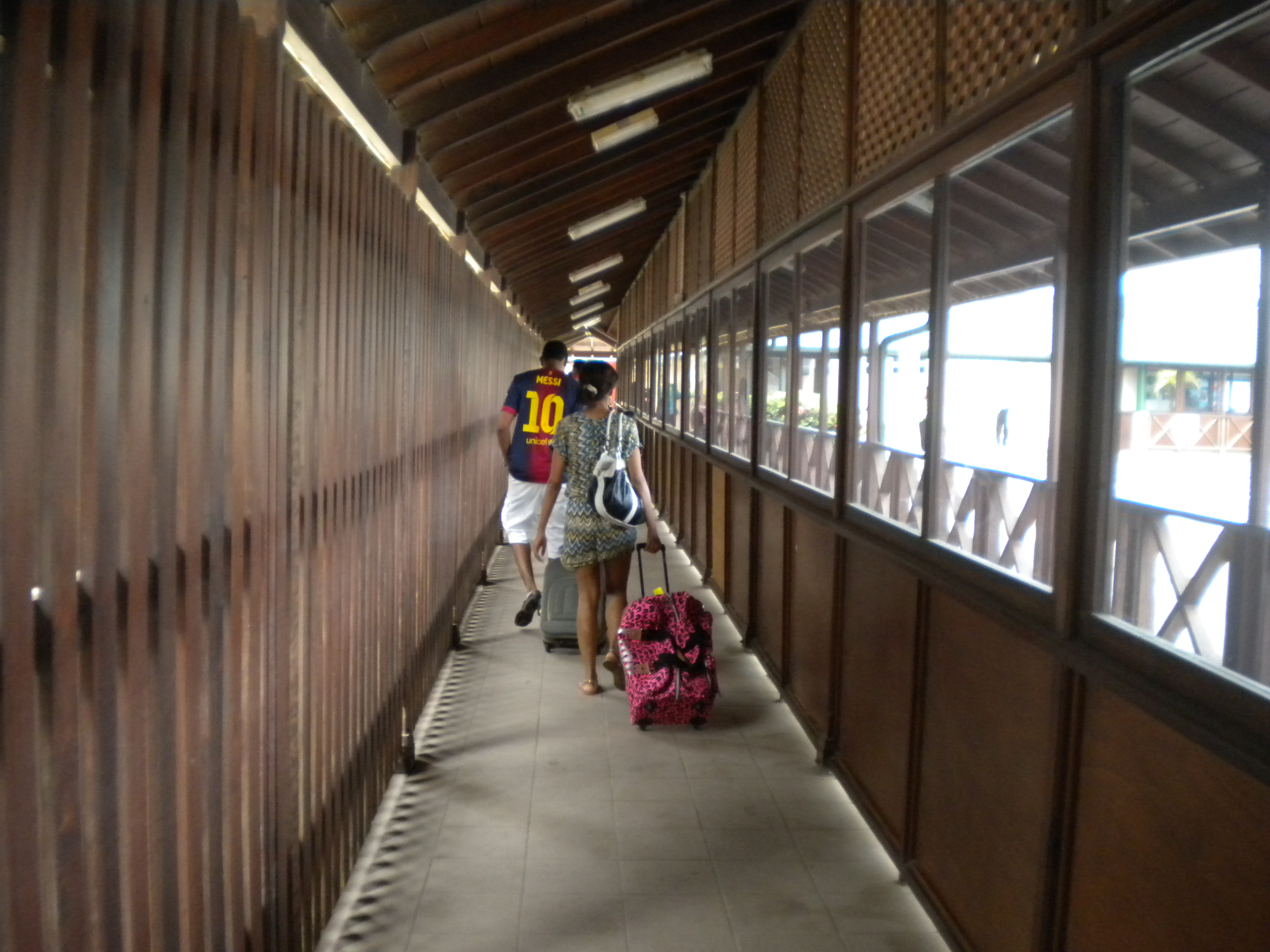
Passageway at George F. L. Charles Airport, in Saint Lucia

== Other facilities ==
The airport houses the George Charles Outstation of the Eastern Caribbean Civil Aviation Authority, General Aviation Services, and the Island Flyers Club.

== Navigation ==
The airport offers an RNAV and NDB approach only on Runway 9. Landings on Runway 27 are strictly visual.

== Accidents and incidents ==
On 8 November 2015, a Beechcraft Model 99, registered N7994H, veered off the runway into a grassy area at George F. L. Charles Airport after the aircraft's right landing gear malfunctioned. The sole occupant of the aircraft, the pilot, was not harmed. Following the incident, Hummingbird Air suspended all operations, and the Eastern Caribbean Civil Aviation Authority launched an investigation.

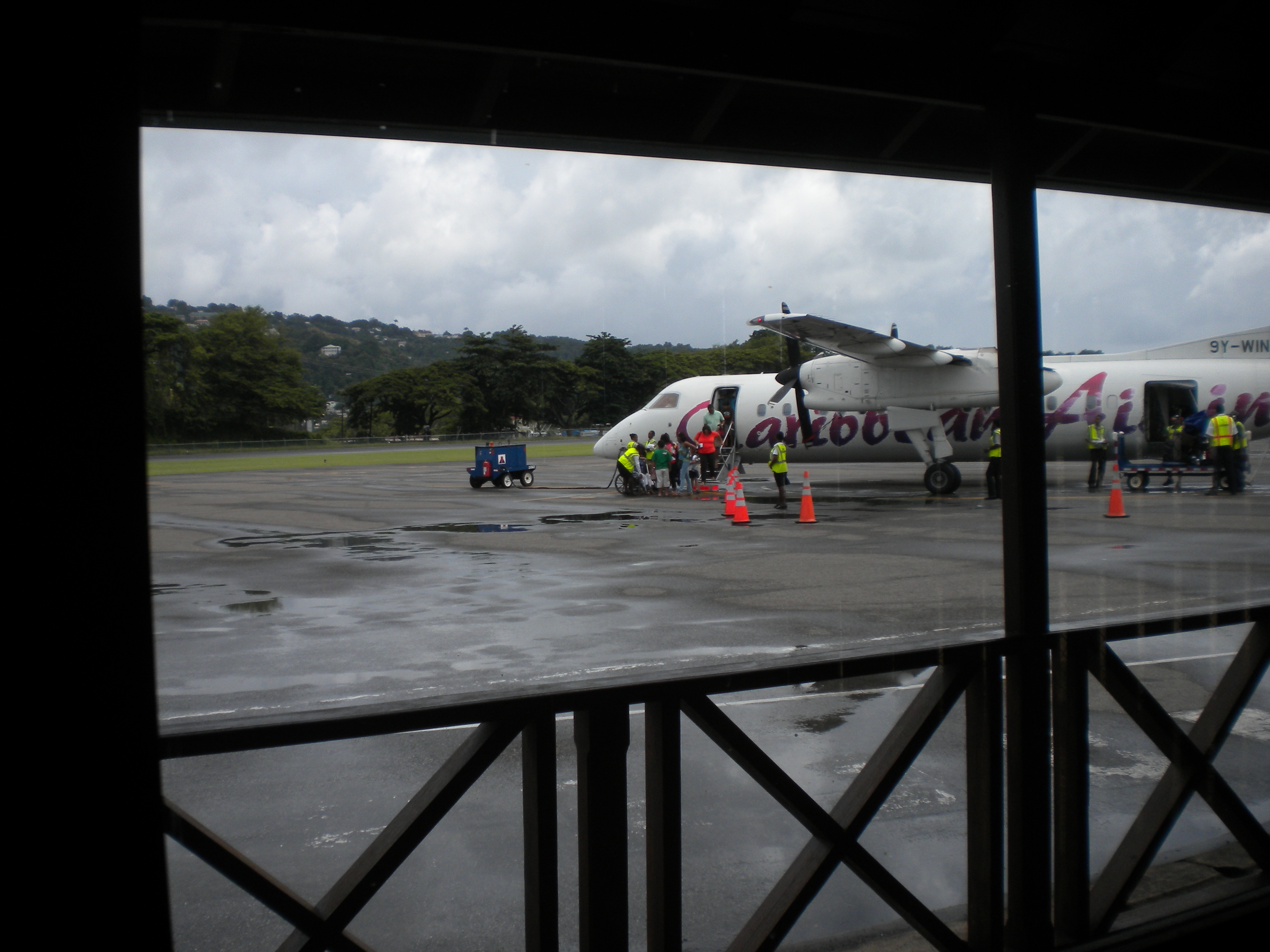
George F. L. Charles Airport apron from the passenger's passageway
