= Maurice Bishop International Airport =

Maurice Bishop Airport
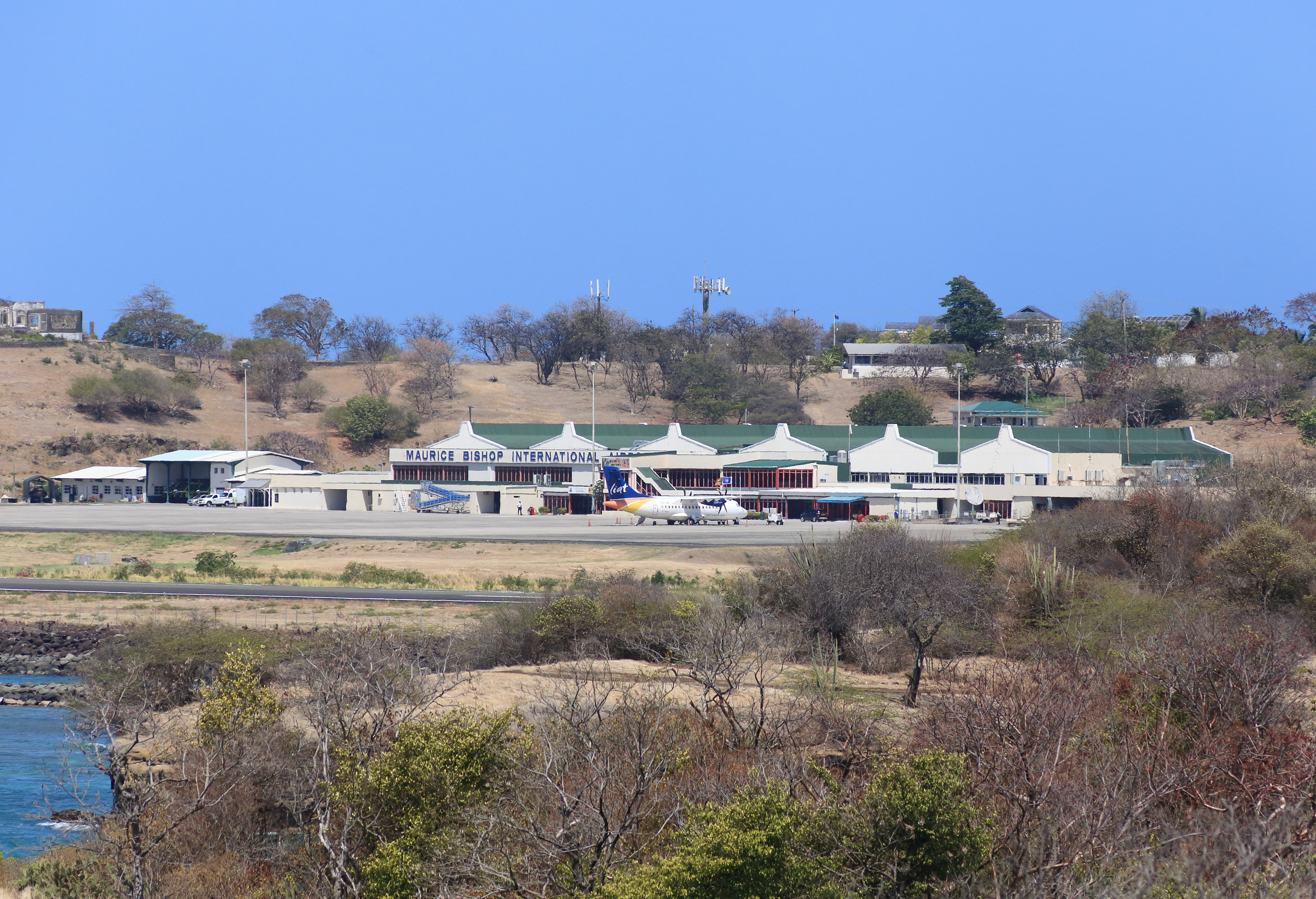
- IATA: GND; ICAO: TGPY

Summary
- Airport type: Public
- Operator: Grenada Airports Authority
- Serves: St George's
- Location: St. George's, Grenada
- Elevation AMSL: 41 ft (12 m)
- Coordinates: 12°00′15″N 061°47′10″W
- Website: https://gaa.gd/

Map
- Location in Grenada

Runways
Direction	Length		Surface
Direction	m	ft	Surface
10/28	2,744	9,003	Asphalt
- Source: DAFIF

Maurice Bishop International Airport (IATA: GND, ICAO: TGPY), formerly known as Point Salines Airport, is an international airport located in the parish of St. George. The town of St. George's is about 8 kilometres (5 mi) north of the airport and is the capital of the island nation of Grenada. The airport is located on Point Salines, the most southwestern point of the island. It is named after former Prime Minister Maurice Bishop (1944–1983), who championed the construction project in 1979.

== History ==
The building of the airport — designed to replace the obsolete Pearls Airport on the north side of the island — was cited by U.S. President Ronald Reagan as evidence that the Grenadian government intended to allow it to be used as a way point for Soviet military aircraft en route to Cuba. He buttressed this claim with the evidence that it was being built, in part, by Cuban workers.

Bishop and his government contended that the Point Salines airport was intended to make the island more accessible to European and North American tourists. The long-range jets that carried such tourists could not land on the short and geographically difficult runway at the existing airport, Pearls. As a result, tourists bound for Grenada had to put up with the delays, expenses and perceived risks of changing to smaller planes flown by regional carriers. The Grenadian government said they hoped their tourist trade would dramatically increase if direct flights from Europe and North America were possible. The airport itself was designed by a Canadian firm and specialized construction contracts were awarded to European contractors. Two private American construction firms also participated in the project.

The unfinished airport was chosen as the jump-off point for the invasion of Grenada by the United States in October 1983. The event that precipitated the U.S.-led invasion was not the construction of the airport, but, rather, a violent coup in which Prime Minister Maurice Bishop was killed. The American justification for the invasion was the perceived threat to American medical students at St. George's University, whose campus is a short distance from the airport.

At dawn on October 25, 1983, more than 500 Rangers from the 1st and 2nd Battalions of the United States Army 75th Ranger Regiment conducted a risky, low-altitude parachute assault onto the unfinished airport. Despite resistance from Grenadian armed forces (PRA - People's Revolutionary Army) and armed Cuban construction workers, the Rangers secured all of their objectives on the airfield quickly. The seizure of the airfield allowed United States Air Force C-141 transport planes to land, beginning at 2:05 P.M., and unload six battalions of paratroopers from the 82nd Airborne Division, the follow-on occupation force.

After the invasion, Point Salines International Airport was completed with $19 million in American assistance and landed its first commercial passenger plane on Oct. 28, 1984. The airport was renamed for the late Prime Minister in 2009 by the National Democratic Congress (NDC) government with his mother Alimenta Bishop present.

== Facilities ==
The airport is at an elevation of 12 m (41 ft) above mean sea level. It has one runway designated 10/28 with an asphalt surface measuring 2,744 m × 45 m (9,003 ft × 148 ft).

The airport houses the Grenada Outstation of the Eastern Caribbean Civil Aviation Authority.

== Airlines and destinations ==
The following airlines serve Grenada:

=== Passenger ===
The following airlines operate regular scheduled and charter flights at Maurice Bishop Airport:

Airlines	Destinations
Air Canada	Toronto–Pearson
American Airlines	Miami; Seasonal: Charlotte
British Airways	Barbados, London–Gatwick
Caribbean Airlines	Barbados, Port of Spain, St. Vincent–Argyle
Delta Air Lines	Atlanta
InterCaribbean Airways	Barbados, Georgetown–Cheddi Jagan, St. Vincent–Argyle
JetBlue	New York–JFK
Liat20	Castries
Sunrise Airways	Antigua, Castries
Virgin Atlantic	Barbados, London–Heathrow
WestJet	Seasonal: Toronto–Pearson
