= Groupe Dubreuil =

French group

- Type: Diversified family holding company
- Industry: activities of head offices
- Founded: 1924
- Key people: Jean-Paul Dubreuil (chairman)
- Subsidiaries: Air Caraïbes, French Bee
- Website: www.groupedubreuil.com

Groupe Dubreuil is a diversified family holding company, including Air Caraïbes and French Bee.

== History ==
The Groupe Dubreuil, initially wholesaler of grocery stores and fuel distribution, was founded in 1924 by Henri Dubreuil in La Roche-sur-Yon. After 1950, the company developed "a network of rural gas stations". In 1961, the company partnered with Spar (a food wholesaler).

In 1966, Henri Dubreuil died of a heart attack and his 24-year-old son, Jean-Paul Dubreuil, succeeded him.

In 1973, two years after merging two Spar wholesalers to create Oedis, the company partnered with the wholesaler Disco (Oedisco). In 1974, Jean-Paul Dubreuil opened his first Bravo supermarket (now Hyper U), in a warehouse owned by his father-in-law.

An aviator, Jean-Paul Dubreuil, who earned his pilot's license at age 17, established a small taxi company, Air Vendée in 1975. This allowed him to manage the Disco wholesaler, whose sites are distributed throughout France.

At the same time, the group opened its first brick-and-mortar store, Bricogite, in 1980 and its first Peugeot car dealership in 1987. In 1985, the resale of supermarkets allowed the group to continue to develop in aviation.

Air Vendée went bankrupt and partnered with other small local airlines (Airlec, etc.) to establish Regional Airlines in 1992. It connected provincial cities to larger European cities.

In 1996, Regional Airlines became publicly traded. The transfer of 10.96% of its capital allowed the company to raise 33 million francs.

Logo of Air Caraïbes

In 1998, the company bought Air Caribbean to reduce the taxes of the Dubreuil Group, followed by the acquisitions of Air Martinique, Air Guadeloupe, Air Saint-Martin and Air Saint-Barthely.

In 2000, the group transferred its stake in Regional Airlines (70%) to Air France for EUR 42.7 million.

At the end of 2003, following the collapse of Air Lib, another airline, the group purchased a long-haul aircraft for its subsidiary Air Caribbean for EUR 150 million to connect Paris-Orly with the Caribbean. It offered routes 15% cheaper than Air France. Seven years later, it held a 27% market share.

In 2008, the company sold its oil trading subsidiary to invest in photovoltaic energy.

In 2015, the group tried to buy its competitor, Corsair, but ultimately abandoned the effort.

The following year, Dubreuil Group established a low-cost long-haul airline, first named French blue, then French Bee.

In 2020, following the outbreak of COVID-19, the CMA CGM group was expected to take up 30% of the capital of Air Caribbean and French Bee, contingent on a capital increase of EUR 50 million. The following year, the agreement was not reached. The Dubreuil Group secured a state-guaranteed loan (EMP) of EUR 150 million. At the end of December 2021, the two airline subsidiaries of the Group Dubreuil were recapitalized by the group itself with EUR 15 million each.

At the end of June 2023, the Dubreuil group announced the departure of Jean-Paul Dubreuil and Marc Rochet, the duo who had led the group for 20 years. Jean-Paul Dubreuil, President of Groupe Dubreuil Aéro (GDA), passed the position to his son, Paul-Henri Dubreuil, currently CEO of the family group Dubreuil. Christine Ourmières-Widener took over the position of Chief Executive Officer of Air Caribbean, Air Caribbean Atlantic, French bee and Heline Cargo from Marc Rochet.
