= World's longest domestic flight =

Air Tahiti Nui Flight 64 (TN64/THT64) was the world's longest domestic flight, and the longest scheduled passenger flight ever. It was created due to restrictions imposed by the United States over international flights in a context of the COVID-19 pandemic. The flight, operated by Air Tahiti Nui, was between Papeete in French Polynesia and Paris in metropolitan France, traversing a distance of 15,715 kilometres (9,765 mi; 8,485 nmi) and taking 16 hours, 26 minutes. It was a domestic flight as French Polynesia is part of the French Republic.

== Historical records ==
=== Longest domestic flight ===
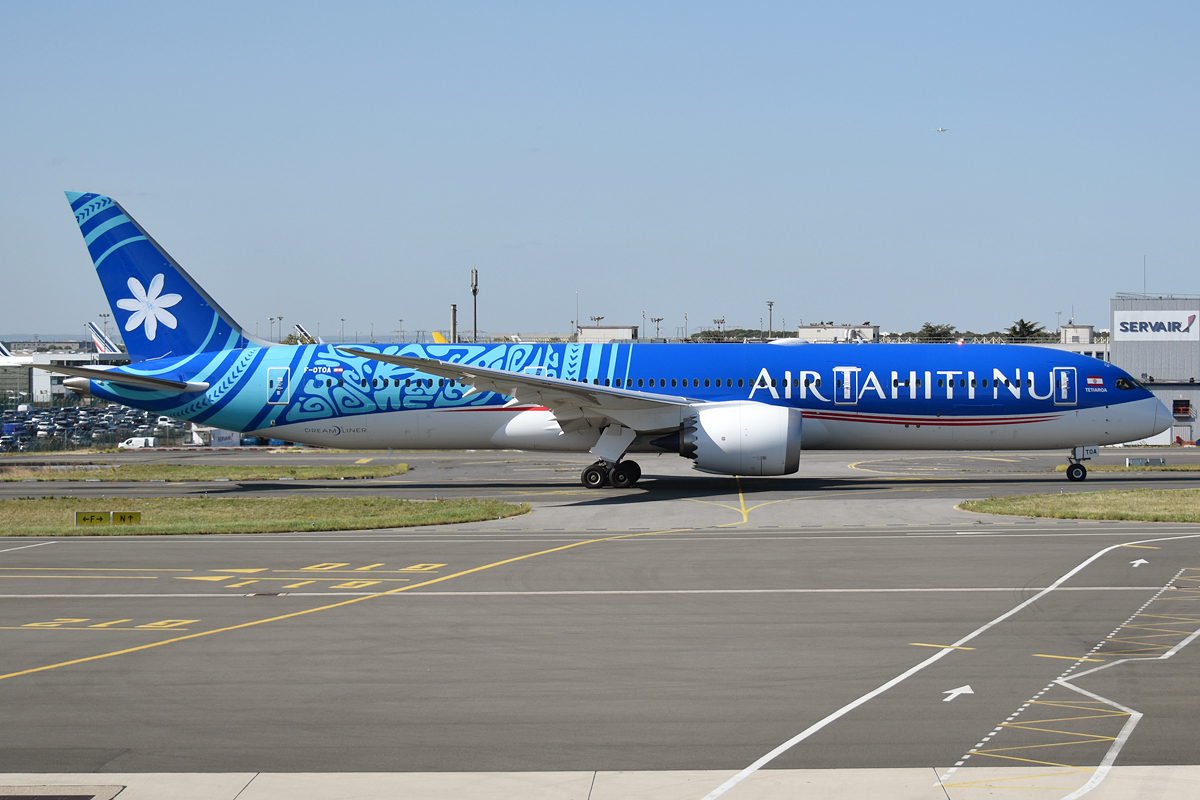
"Tetiaroa" (registered F-OTOA), a Boeing 787-9, one of the planes that operated Air Tahiti Nui's longest domestic flights.

The world's longest commercial domestic flight was flight TN64 operated by Air Tahiti Nui, a French airline based in French Polynesia. The flight operated between Tahiti's Faa'a International Airport near Papeete to Charles de Gaulle Airport near Paris, France. It covered a great-circle distance of 15,715 kilometres (9,765 mi; 8,485 nmi) taking approximately 16 hours and 20 minutes. With its great-circle distance, it set the record both for world's longest domestic flight as well as the world's longest non-stop commercial flight.

Air Tahiti Nui began the route on 15 March 2020, departing Faa'a International Airport at 3:14 AM local time as flight TN64, flying nonstop to Charles de Gaulle Airport and landing at 6:00 AM local time on 16 March, taking 15 hours and 46 minutes. The Boeing 787-9 operating the flight (registered F-OTOA) carrying between 130 and 150 passengers (and no cargo on the eastbound route). TN64 continued to operate the flight through March and April 2020, with its final flight on 19 April 2020.

The record for longest non-stop commercial flight by great-circle distance was previously held by Singapore Airlines, with their Singapore to Newark route at a distance of 15,343 kilometres (9,534 mi; 8,285 nmi).

=== Longest domestic flight (cargo only) ===
French Bee operated the longest nonstop domestic cargo flight, from Tahiti to Paris on 14 May 2020, departing Faa'a International Airport at 10:51 AM local time and landing at Orly Airport at 3:40 PM local time on 15 May 2020, taking 16 hours and 49 minutes. This flight did not carry passengers in part as Orly Airport was closed to all commercial passenger traffic from March to June 2020. The airline further claimed its Airbus A350-900 operating the flight (registered F-HREY) flew a ground distance of 16,129 kilometres (10,022 mi; 8,709 nmi), thus surpassing the distance of Air Tahiti Nui's flight, but was not operated as a commercial passenger flight and no tickets were sold, instead carrying approximately 5 tons of cargo.

== Background ==
The non-stop routes flown by certain airlines were developed as consequence of the COVID-19 pandemic and the subsequent restrictions imposed by the United States over international flights which came into effect on 11 March 2020. Before the pandemic, the flight between Papeete and Charles de Gaulle Airport in Paris was operated by Air Tahiti Nui as well as Air France with an intermediate stop at Los Angeles International Airport, while the flight between Papeete and Orly Airport in Paris was operated by French Bee with an intermediate stop at San Francisco International Airport. The airlines serving these routes also held traffic rights to transport passengers between either Paris or Papeete and the intermediate stop. Both the Boeing 787-9 used by Air Tahiti Nui and the Airbus A350-900 used by French Bee were claimed by their respective airlines to have greater fuel and energy efficiency compared to other similar or older long-haul widebody aircraft, while flying with a smaller payload to be able to achieve the long distance without stopping for additional fuel.

Air Tahiti Nui, French Bee and Air France have all pursued other stopping points to cover the long distance between French Polynesia and metropolitan France, including stopping at Pointe-à-Pitre International Airport in the French overseas territory of Guadeloupe, as well as stopping at Vancouver International Airport in the Canadian province of British Columbia. However, unlike the intermediate stops in the United States prior to the pandemic, the stop in Vancouver was solely for transit, as none of the airlines could discharge or take on additional passengers at the intermediate stop.

== Current record ==
=== Longest domestic flight (active) ===
Originally launched in 1994, the longest currently active domestic flight is between Saint-Denis, Réunion, France and Paris, France (Charles de Gaulle Airport) and covers 9,349 kilometres (5,809 mi; 5,048 nmi) in 11 hours 40 minutes. It is operated today by two carriers, Air France and Air Austral. Previously operated by Air France as a direct flight with refueling stops, it changed to a non-stop flight following the completion of the new longer runway at Saint-Denis that could accommodate Air France's fully loaded 747s in November 1994. Today it is operated using Boeing 777 and 787s, capable of covering the 11 hour domestic flight with ease. While much shorter than the longest domestic flight ever, it remains the longest operating today, beating the second longest domestic flight from Paris' Orly Airport to Saint-Denis, Réunion by just 12 kilometres (7.5 mi).

=== Longest domestic flights (top 30, by great circle distance) ===
Rank	From	To	Flight	Distance	Scheduled duration	Aircraft
1	(France) Paris–CDG	(France) Saint Denis, Reunion	Air France AF 647/673; Air Austral UU 971/975	9,349 km (5,809 mi; 5,048 nmi)	11:40	777-300ER
2	(France) Paris–Orly	(France) Saint Denis, Reunion	Corsair SS 773; French Bee BF 701/703/705	9,337 km (5,802 mi; 5,042 nmi)	12:05	A330-900; A350-1000
3	(France) Marseille	(France) Saint Denis, Reunion	Corsair SS 633	8,781 km (5,456 mi; 4,741 nmi)	11:20	A330-900
4	(France) Paris–CDG	(France) Mayotte	Air Austral UU 976	8,030 km (4,990 mi; 4,340 nmi)	9:45	787-8
5	(United States) New York–JFK	(United States) Honolulu	Delta Air Lines DL 312; Hawaiian Airlines HA 51	8,020 km (4,980 mi; 4,330 nmi)	11:25	767-300ER; A330-200
6	(United States) Newark	(United States) Honolulu	United Airlines UA 363	7,986 km (4,962 mi; 4,312 nmi)	11:25	767-400ER
7	(Netherlands) Aruba	(Netherlands) Amsterdam	Tuifly Netherlands OR 364	7,883 km (4,898 mi; 4,256 nmi)	9:55	787-8
8	(Netherlands) Curaçao	(Netherlands) Amsterdam	KLM KL 736; Tuifly Netherlands OR 368	7,838 km (4,870 mi; 4,232 nmi)	10:15	A330-300; 777-200; 787-8
9	(Netherlands) Bonaire	(Netherlands) Amsterdam	KLM KL 765; Tuifly Netherlands OR 365	7,796 km (4,844 mi; 4,210 nmi)	10:10	A330-200; A330-300; 787-8
10	(United States) Washington D.C.–Dulles	(United States) Honolulu	United Airlines UA 345	7,752 km (4,817 mi; 4,186 nmi)	10:46	767-400ER
11	(United States) Atlanta	(United States) Honolulu	Delta Air Lines DL 650	7,246 km (4,502 mi; 3,913 nmi)	10:16	A330-300; 767-300ER
12	(United States) Detroit	(United States) Honolulu	Delta Air Lines DL 797	7,202 km (4,475 mi; 3,889 nmi)	10:29	A330-300
13	(United States) Atlanta	(United States) Kahului	Delta Air Lines DL 368	7,131 km (4,431 mi; 3,850 nmi)	10:10	A330-300
14	(France) Paris–CDG	(France) Cayenne	Air France AF 952	7,107 km (4,416 mi; 3,837 nmi)	9:15	777-200
15	(France) Paris–Orly	(France) Cayenne	Air Caraibes TX 570	7,082 km (4,401 mi; 3,824 nmi)	9:10	A350-900
16	(Netherlands) Amsterdam	(Netherlands) Saint Maarten	KLM KL 725	6,939 km (4,312 mi; 3,747 nmi)	9:15	A330-200
17	(France) Paris–CDG	Fort-de-France	Air France AF 810	6,873 km (4,271 mi; 3,711 nmi)	8:50	777-300ER
18	(France) Paris–Orly	Fort-de-France	Air Caraibes TX 510	6,855 km (4,259 mi; 3,701 nmi)	8:55	A330-200; A350-900; A350-1000
19	(United States) Chicago–O'Hare	(United States) Honolulu	American Airlines AA 75; United Airlines UA 219	6,829 km (4,243 mi; 3,687 nmi)	9:35	787-8; 787-10
20	(United States) Chicago–O'Hare	(United States) Kailua-Kona	United Airlines UA 66; American Airlines AA 89 (starting December 2026)	6,780 km (4,210 mi; 3,660 nmi)	9:23; 9:45	787-8
21	(France) Paris–CDG	(France) Pointe-à-Pitre	Air France AF 762	6,774 km (4,209 mi; 3,658 nmi)	9:00	777-300ER
22	(Russia) Petropavlovsk-Kamchatsky	(Russia) Moscow–Sheremetyevo	Aeroflot SU 1731	6,764 km (4,203 mi; 3,652 nmi)	9:10	777-300ER
23	(United States) Chicago–O'Hare	(United States) Kahului	United Airlines UA 202	6,734 km (4,184 mi; 3,636 nmi)	9:25	787-8
24	(Russia) Yuzhno-Sakhalinsk	(Russia) Moscow–Sheremetyevo	Aeroflot SU 6274/6284	6,662 km (4,140 mi; 3,597 nmi)	8:50	A330-300; 777-300ER
25	(Russia) Vladivostok	(Russia) Saint Petersburg	Aeroflot SU 2983	6,554 km (4,072 mi; 3,539 nmi)	8:40	A330-300
26	(France) Nantes	Fort-de-France	Corsair SS 744	6,528 km (4,056 mi; 3,525 nmi)	8:45	A330-900
27	(Russia) Vladivostok	(Russia) Moscow–Sheremetyevo	Aeroflot SU 1701	6,423 km (3,991 mi; 3,468 nmi)	8:50	A350-900; 777-300ER
28	(United States) Minneapolis/Saint Paul	(United States) Honolulu	Delta Air Lines DL 312	6,392 km (3,972 mi; 3,451 nmi)	9:15	A330-300; 767-300ER
29	(United States) Houston	(United States) Honolulu	United Airlines UA 253	6,282 km (3,903 mi; 3,392 nmi)	8:40	777-200
30	(Russia) Anadyr	(Russia) Moscow–Sheremetyevo	Aeroflot SU 6866	6,199 km (3,852 mi; 3,347 nmi)	8:05	747-400; 777-300ER

== Discontinued flights ==
Rank	From	To	Flight	Distance	Scheduled duration	Aircraft	Final Flight
1	(France) Papeete	(France) Paris–CDG	Air Tahiti Nui TN 64	15,715 km (9,765 mi; 8,485 nmi)	16:20	787-9	19 Apr 2020
2	(United States) Los Angeles	(United States) Guam	Braniff BN 505/926	9,799 km (6,089 mi; 5,291 nmi)	11:20	747-200; 747SP	13 Oct 1980
3	(United States) Boston	(United States) Honolulu	Hawaiian Airlines HA 89	8,199 km (5,095 mi; 4,427 nmi)	11:35	A330-200	19 Nov 2025
4	(United States) Newark	(United States) Kahului	United Airlines UA 42	7,891 km (4,903 mi; 4,261 nmi)	10:55	767-300ER	6 Jan 2024
5	(United States) Orlando	(United States) Honolulu	Hawaiian Airlines HA 85	7,655 km (4,757 mi; 4,133 nmi)	10:50	A330-200	8 Sep 2022
6	(United States) Charlotte	(United States) Honolulu	American Airlines AA 258/569	7,528 km (4,678 mi; 4,065 nmi)	10:06	777-200	3 Jan 2022
7	(France) Lyon	(France) Pointe-à-Pitre	Corsair SS 742	6,921 km (4,301 mi; 3,737 nmi)	9:20	A330-300	21 Apr 2023
8	(Russia) Sochi	(Russia) Khabarovsk	Transaero UN 2138	6,900 km (4,300 mi; 3,700 nmi)	9:30	767-200	25 Oct 2015
9	(France) Paris–Orly	(Netherlands) Saint Maarten	Air Caraibes TX 520	6,729 km (4,181 mi; 3,633 nmi)	8:25	A330-200	13 Dec 2022

== Future routes ==
The below new services have been announced and scheduled for operation. These announced flights have a distance exceeding 6,199 kilometres (3,852 mi; 3,347 nmi), these will be placed on the top 30 list:

From	To	Flight	Distance	Scheduled duration	Aircraft	First flight
(United States) Boston	(United States) Honolulu	Delta Air Lines TBD	8,199 km (5,095 mi; 4,427 nmi)	11:35	A330-300	19 Dec 2026
(United States) Minneapolis/Saint Paul	(United States) Kahului	Delta Air Lines TBD	6,305 km (3,918 mi; 3,404 nmi)	TBA	A330-300	19 Dec 2026

== See also ==
- Longest flights
