= French Bee =

French airline based at Orly Airport

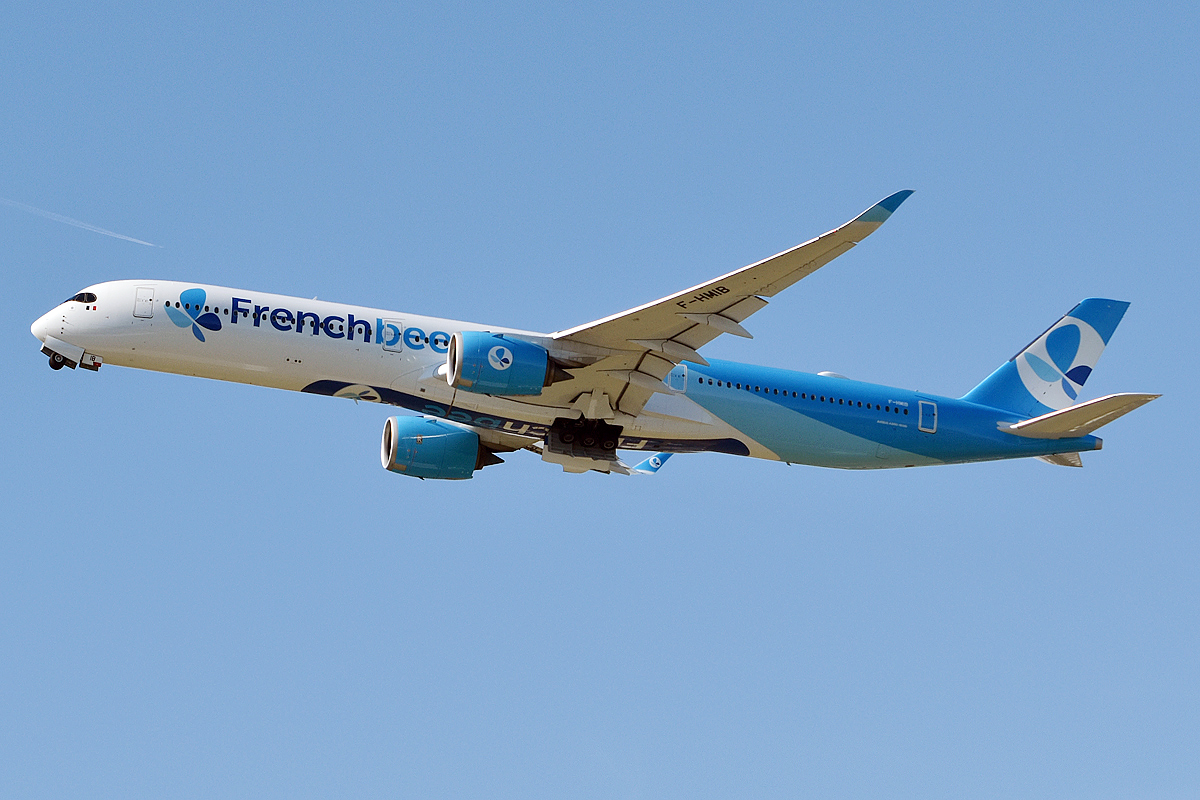
- Airbus A350-1000
IATA	ICAO	Call sign
BF	FBU	FRENCH BEE
- Founded: March 2016; 10 years ago (as French Blue)
- Commenced operations: 10 September 2016; 10 years ago
- Operating bases: Paris–Orly
- Fleet size: 6
- Destinations: 8
- Parent company: Groupe Dubreuil
- Headquarters: Bellevigny, France
- Key people: Paul-Henri Dubreuil (President); Marc-Antoine Blondeau (Chairman); Stavros Melachroinos (Co-founder)
- Website: www.frenchbee.com

French Bee SAS, styled French bee, and formerly named French Blue, is a French low-cost, long-haul airline based at Paris Orly Airport. It operates a scheduled network between France and worldwide leisure destinations with a fleet of Airbus A350 aircraft. Its headquarters are inside the parent company Groupe Dubreuil's offices in the Belleville-sur-Vie area of Bellevigny, Vendée, France.

== History ==
=== Formation and startup (2014–2017) ===
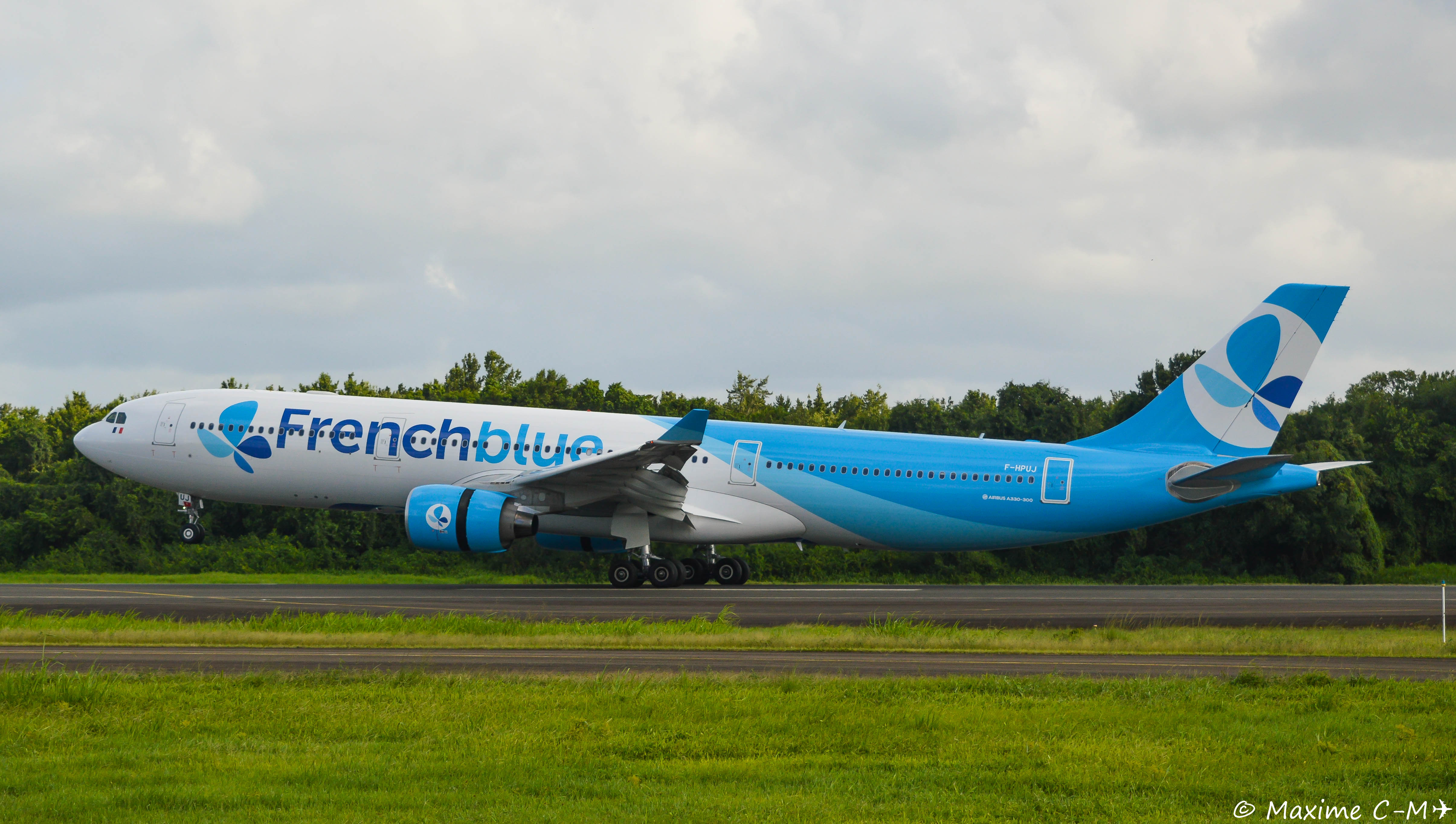
The airline's first Airbus A330-300, with the 2016–18 titles French Blue

In 2014, Marc Rochet (an airline executive of the French Caribbean airline Air Caraïbes, with prior executive experience at airlines including AOM and L'Avion) and Jean-Paul Dubreuil (chairman of Groupe Dubreuil, the holding and parent company of Air Caraïbes) discussed ways to expand Groupe Dubreuil's aviation businesses. A possibility included the buyout of Corsair International from TUI Group; however when the buyout fell through in March 2015, a decision was made to instead form an entirely new airline. In June 2015, Groupe Dubreuil announced the launch of a project under the provisional name "Sunline", the creation of a new low-cost, long-haul airline to be based in France. The airline was publicly unveiled in March 2016, under the name French Blue. Plans for the airline's first two years were to launch flights from Paris to Punta Cana in September 2016, flights to the islands of Réunion and Mauritius in summer 2017, and to operate a fleet of two Airbus A330-300 and two Airbus A350-900 aircraft by March 2018. The airline also planned to hire 400 employees within two years.

After receiving its first Airbus A330-300, the airline operated some long-haul flights on behalf of Air Caraïbes from 1 July 2016, before the airline's first flight from Paris Orly to Punta Cana International Airport on 10 September 2016. In October 2016, the airline announced its next destination from Paris Orly with flights to Roland Garros Airport on Réunion island, beginning on 16 June 2017. In August 2017, the airline received its first Airbus A350-900, and was also considering Mauritius and Seychelles as new destinations for 2018. By November 2017, however, the airline ultimately chose Papeete and San Francisco as its next destinations, with plans to begin serving them on 11 May 2018.

=== Rebranding and expansion (2017–2020) ===
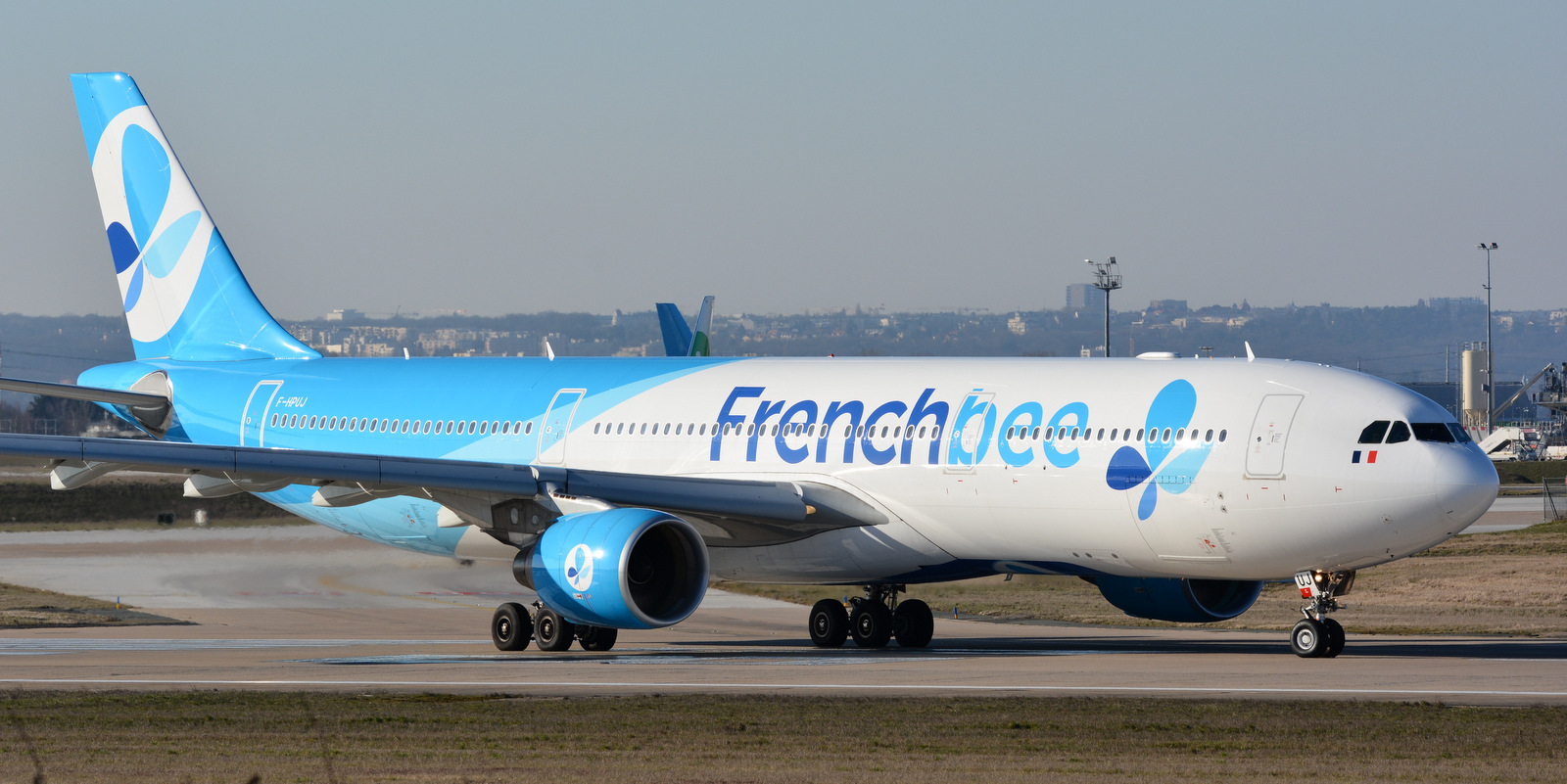
Airbus A330-300 after the airline's 2018 rebranding as French Bee. This aircraft was transferred to sister airline Air Caraïbes in 2019

In November 2017, while the airline was applying with the United States Department of Transportation for a foreign air carrier permit to begin service to the country, U.S.-based JetBlue raised objections to another airline serving the country bearing the word "blue" in its name. In response, the airline was temporarily renamed simply "French", before they announced on 30 January 2018 that it was renaming as French Bee. In February 2018, after receiving regulatory approval to begin operations to the U.S., the airline formally announced the opening of reservations for flights between Paris Orly and Faa'a International Airport (Papeete) in French Polynesia, with flights stopping at San Francisco International Airport each way, and launching on 11 May 2018 as previously planned. The services included international traffic rights for passengers to travel solely to or from San Francisco in addition to transiting between Paris and Papeete.

In June 2018, parent company Groupe Dubreuil announced the addition of a third Airbus A350-900 to French Bee's fleet, to be delivered in June 2019, and that the airline's Airbus A330-300 would be reconfigured and transferred to Air Caraïbes upon the A350's delivery. Following this, the airline's fleet consisted entirely of Airbus A350 aircraft. Also during June 2019, Groupe Dubreuil allocated a fourth A350-900 to the airline for delivery during 2020, and with this expansion to its fleet, the airline in September 2019 announced its second destination in the U.S. with flights to Newark Liberty International Airport, to begin on 10 June 2020. Groupe Dubreuil also announced that it had allocated deliveries for the larger A350-1000 variant to the airline, initially with one each in 2021 and 2022, but was later reported to have been adjusted for both A350-1000s to be delivered during 2021.

In January 2020, French Bee was granted traffic rights to operate services between Paris Orly and São Paulo, Brazil, following the redistribution of traffic rights previously held by Aigle Azur and XL Airways France, which had both gone defunct during September 2019. The airline had not decided which São Paulo airport it would serve between either Guarulhos or Viracopos International Airport, though the airline proposed a June 2021 start date in its application for the traffic rights, with the possibility of an expedited start date during December 2020 by chartering an aircraft from Air Caraïbes. In February 2020, the airline announced an interlining agreement with Alaska Airlines through Alaska's hub in San Francisco, and in anticipation of French Bee's planned services to Newark, a destination also served by Alaska.

=== COVID-19 pandemic (2020–2023) ===
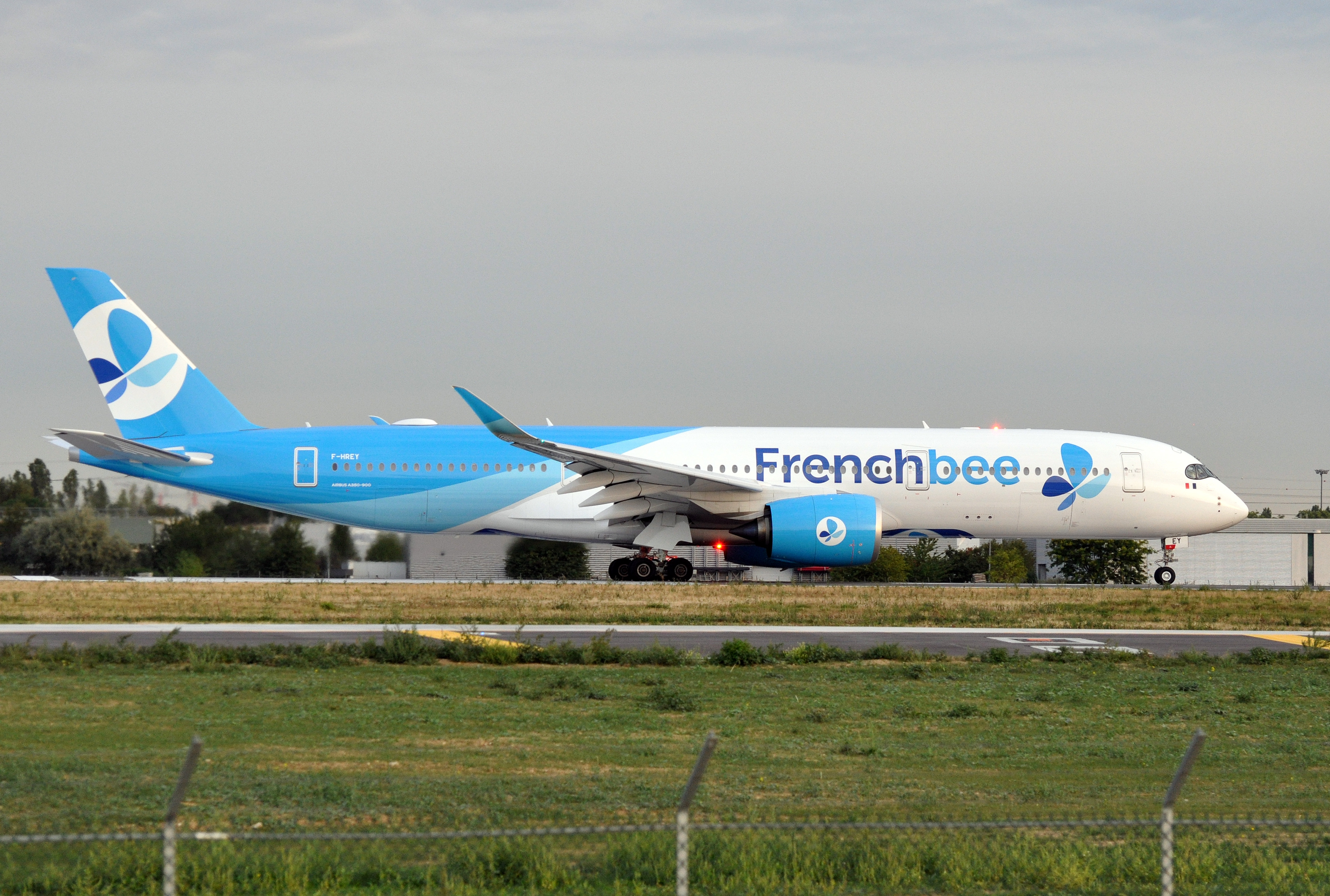
The Airbus A350-900 that operated French Bee's nonstop flight from Papeete to Paris Orly in May 2020 as the world's longest domestic flight

During the COVID-19 pandemic and its impact on aviation, which included the United States travel ban beginning in March 2020, French Bee temporarily suspended its operations to the U.S., intending to operate its flights to Faa'a International Airport by rerouting its intermediate stop from San Francisco International Airport to Pointe-à-Pitre International Airport, allowing for the route's stops between France and French Polynesia to occur within French domestic territories. Shortly after, the airline instead suspended its commercial flights to French Polynesia after 15 March 2020, with the initial intention of resuming them on 10 April 2020. As overseas borders between the airline's Paris Orly base and its destinations began to close, the remainder of the airline's commercial operations (which included its flights to Réunion) were suspended starting from 28 March 2020, with the suspensions expected to last for at least two months. Four days later on 1 April 2020, Orly Airport closed to commercial passenger traffic.

While French Bee's commercial passenger operations were suspended, the airline still operated some charter and cargo-only flights, and while doing so claimed the record for the world's longest domestic flight, though the flight did not carry any passengers as Paris Orly remained closed to passenger traffic. After making a stopover in Pointe-à-Pitre on a flight from Paris Orly to Papeete carrying medical supplies to French Polynesia, the Airbus A350-900 operating the flight returned from Papeete to Paris Orly as a nonstop flight on 15 May 2020, traveling a great-circle distance of 15,728 kilometres (9,773 mi), with the airline claiming it traveled a ground distance of 16,129 kilometres (10,022 mi). The distance of the flight surpassed the record of Air Tahiti Nui, which initially took the record for its flight from Papeete to Paris Charles de Gaulle earlier that March, with Air Tahiti Nui's Boeing 787-9 traveling a great-circle distance of 15,715 kilometres (9,765 mi).

As Orly Airport was still closed to commercial passenger traffic since 1 April 2020, French Bee's Paris-based operations were temporarily relocated to Charles de Gaulle Airport when the airline's passenger flights to Réunion resumed on 12 June 2020. Following Paris Orly's reopening to commercial passenger traffic on 26 June 2020, the airline's operations returned to Paris Orly on 13 July 2020, with the resumption of its commercial flights to French Polynesia following on 15 July 2020. As international borders between Europe and the United States remained closed, the airline's planned flights to Newark Liberty International Airport that were to begin in June 2020 were repeatedly postponed. Additionally, French Bee continued operating its flights to French Polynesia with the intermediate stop occurring in Pointe-à-Pitre or a Canadian airport instead of in San Francisco, though the airline did not pursue international traffic rights to allow passengers to travel solely to or from Canada.

After over a year of suspensions, the airline's flights between Paris Orly and Newark launched on 14 July 2021, as restrictions on travel between France and the United States were gradually lifted, with the resumption of the airline's services to San Francisco between Paris and Papeete following on 10 November 2021. Soon after resuming both of its routes to the United States, the airline on 16 November 2021 announced a new service between Paris Orly and Los Angeles International Airport to begin on 9 April 2022 (later postponed to 30 April 2022), and during the following month, the airline received its first Airbus A350-1000 on 17 December 2021. Following the launch of its Los Angeles service, the airline on 3 May 2022 announced a new service between Paris Orly and Miami International Airport to begin on 15 December 2022, in anticipation of the delivery of its second Airbus A350-1000.

=== Post-pandemic (2023–present) ===
French Bee joined the Dohop platform for virtual interlining in 2023, before launching its own integrated platform on 19 June 2024, which added Avianca, Pegasus Airlines, Spirit Airlines, and Volotea as virtual interlining partners. In July 2024, the airline announced plans to begin its first scheduled services to Canada, with flights between Paris Orly and Montreal initially announced to launch in May 2025, before later announcing 30 April 2025 as the date of inauguration.

== Corporate affairs ==
French Bee is a subsidiary of Groupe Dubreuil, which is also the parent company of Air Caraïbes, and is headquartered in Bellevigny, France. French Bee's first President and CEO was Marc Rochet. In August 2023, he was succeeded by Christine Ourmières-Widener, previously the CEO of TAP Air Portugal, who was appointed to the position. From 21 January 2025, Paul-Henri Dubreuil, already serving as Groupe Dubreuil's CEO and chairman, took over as the airline's interim President, and Marc-Antoine Blondeau was appointed as the airline's chairman following Ourmières-Widener's departure from the company.

== Destinations ==
French Bee operates, or has previously operated scheduled flights to the following destinations as of May 2025:

Country or Territory	City	Airport	Start date	End date	Notes	Ref.
Canada	Montreal	Montréal–Trudeau International Airport	30 April 2025	Present		
Dominican Republic	Punta Cana	Punta Cana International Airport	10 September 2016	Unknown	Terminated	
France	Paris	Orly Airport	10 September 2016	Present	Base	
French Polynesia	Papeete	Faa'a International Airport	11 May 2018	Present		
Maldives	Malé	Velana International Airport	19 December 2026		Seasonal	
Réunion	Saint-Denis	Roland Garros Airport	16 June 2017	Present		
Sri Lanka	Colombo	Bandaranaike International Airport	19 December 2026		Seasonal	
United States	Los Angeles	Los Angeles International Airport	30 April 2022	Present	Seasonal	
United States	Miami	Miami International Airport	15 December 2022	Present		
United States	Newark	Newark Liberty International Airport	14 July 2021	Present		
United States	San Francisco	San Francisco International Airport	11 May 2018	Present		

=== Interline agreements ===
French Bee has interline agreements with the following airlines:

- Air Austral
- Air Tahiti
- Alaska Airlines
- Avianca
- Pegasus Airlines
- Volotea

=== Codeshare agreements ===
French Bee has codeshare agreements with sister airline Air Caraïbes as well as the SNCF, the French national railway operator.

== Cabins and services ==
=== Service ===
French Bee offers two classes of service, consisting of Premium and Economy class. As a low-cost airline, French Bee in most cases charges additional fees for services and amenities offered, such as for seat selection, additional baggage allowances, through buy on board services for catering and comfort kits, as well as for airport services including lounge access and expedited security queues. These are provided via two main booking tiers corresponding to the two classes of service, consisting of "Bee" (previously Basic and Smart) for the Economy cabin and "Premium" for its eponymous cabin. The Bee and Premium tiers each include sub-tiers ranging from "Light" to "Flex", which progressively include more and more services and amenities. The airline also provides catalogues in French and English for in-flight catering and duty-free shopping.

=== In-flight entertainment ===
Seats in both the Premium and Economy cabins of French Bee's aircraft are equipped with an in-flight entertainment touchscreen system by Zodiac Aerospace. The system includes a selection of audio and video on demand (AVOD) consisting of movies, recorded television shows, podcasts, music, and video games. Content on the system is freely available to all passengers, regardless of cabin of service, and each screen is equipped with a USB power outlet. The airline also offers in-flight Wi-Fi access at different service levels for an additional fee.

=== Seating ===
French Bee's Premium cabin consists of seats configured in a 2-3-2 layout on Airbus A350-900 and 2-4-2 layout on Airbus A350-1000. The seats offer 36 inches (91 cm) of pitch and measure 18 inches (46 cm) wide. Each seat is equipped with an adjustable leg, foot, and head rest as well as a power outlet.

The airline's Economy cabin consists of seats configured mostly in a 3-4-3 layout, with some rows toward the rear of the aircraft configured in a 3-3-3 layout. The seats offer 32 inches (81 cm) of pitch and measure 16 inches (41 cm) wide, while two power outlets are included with each set of three or four seats.

== Criticism ==
=== Air Caraïbes employee relations ===
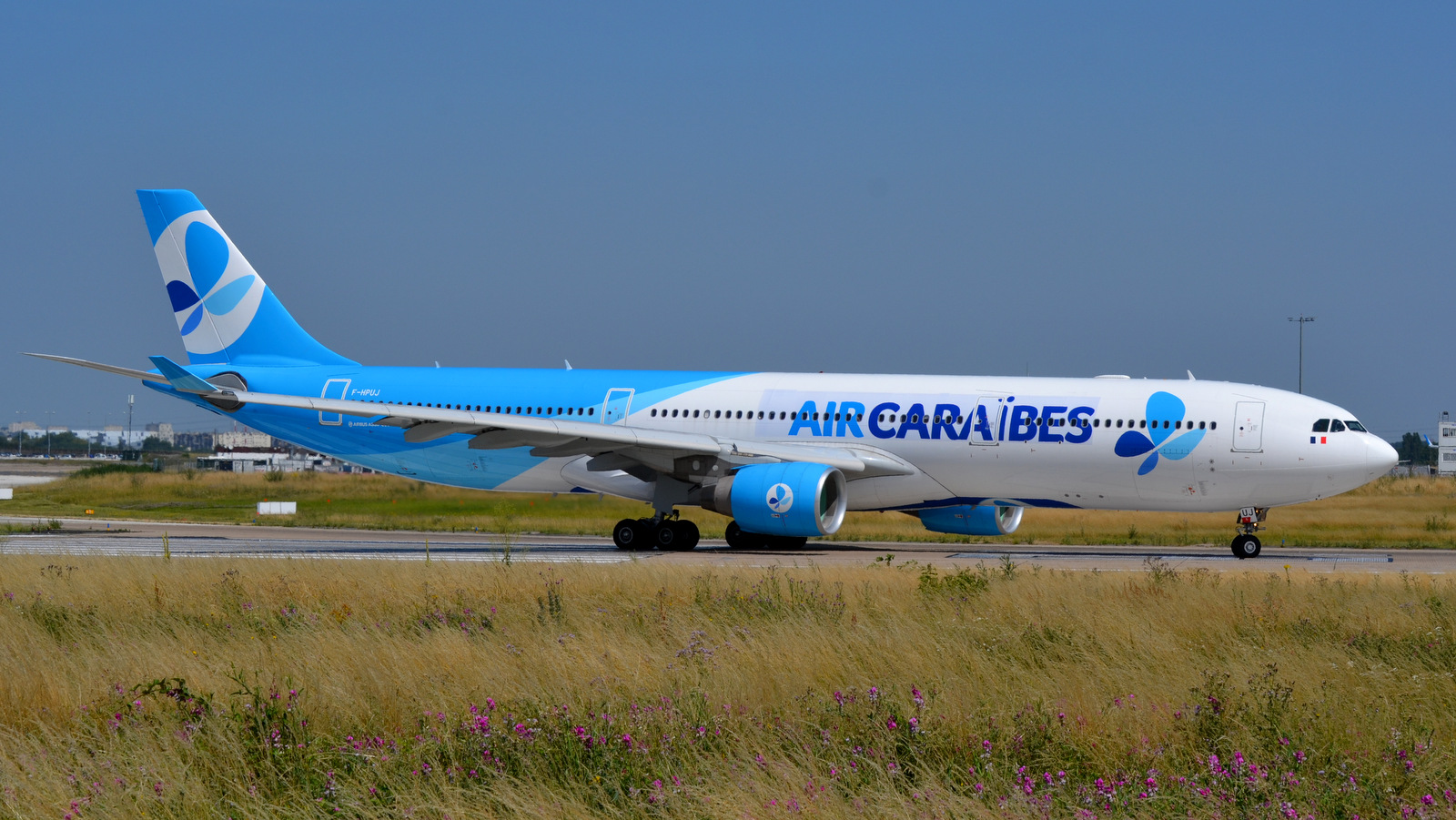
The former French Bee Airbus A330-300 as seen in an interim livery in 2019, following its transfer to Air Caraïbes.

During the airline's initial startup as French Blue in 2016, employee unions of sister airline Air Caraïbes (a full service airline) expressed concerns that French Blue's nature as a low-cost airline would be retroactively used to transfer the transatlantic operations of and impede Air Caraïbes' future growth. The unions cited two Airbus A350-900s due in 2017, previously allocated by Groupe Dubreuil to Air Caraïbes that were instead allocated to French Blue, and demanded that the original plans of delivering the A350s to Air Caraïbes be maintained, or that for every aircraft added to the French Blue fleet, an aircraft would also be added to the Air Caraïbes fleet for the latter's fleet size to remain larger. The unions also stressed that French Blue's operations should be kept separate from those of Air Caraïbes not only in the French Caribbean, but also for the future plans to serve Réunion island, which Groupe Dubreuil had previously announced as part of French Blue's plans for the summer of 2017. Marc Rochet acknowledged Air Caraïbes' successful financial results as a full-service airline and reassured that growth and the use of resources for both Air Caraïbes and French Blue would be possible, noting that French Blue's operations would not interfere with the French Caribbean operations of Air Caraïbes in limiting French Blue's Caribbean presence to Punta Cana in the Dominican Republic.

French Blue's sole Airbus A330-300 was ultimately chartered by Air Caraïbes for some of its flights to the Caribbean even through French Blue's official launch to Punta Cana in September 2016, though French Blue also went ahead with its plans to launch its own flights to Réunion island in June 2017. In subsequent years, both the A330 as well as the Punta Cana route were transferred back to Air Caraïbes, while Air Caraïbes received its share of A350 deliveries and renewed part of its Airbus wide-body fleet. In addition, the overall fleet size of Air Caraïbes remained higher than that of its sister airline.

=== Unsustainable tourism growth in French Polynesia ===
French Blue's intention in 2017 to launch flights from Paris Orly to Papeete via San Francisco in May 2018 was opposed by the Tahoera'a Huiraatira party in the French Polynesian government, although the government also approved the airline's application to start service. Gaston Flosse, the party's leader, argued that the high-cost environment of French Polynesia would be unsuitable for the influx of budget travelers that French Blue would transport to the islands, and that effects from the low-cost airline's new services would be detrimental to the local population. A drop in the market shares of Air France and Air Tahiti Nui, which were already operating services between France and French Polynesia via the United States, was also expected due to the added competition and reduced fares that the airline would introduce to the route. Air Tahiti Nui in particular expressed skepticism toward the long-term sustainability of French Blue's low-cost and long-haul business model, claiming that the concept had not yet proven its success. The airline's initial effects on traffic to French Polynesia were reflected in passenger traffic statistics for June 2018, where after the airline (by then having rebranded as French Bee) launched its Papeete services during the previous month, French Bee attained 10% of the market share for all traffic through Faa'a International Airport, while Air France's share fell by 11.1% and Air Tahiti Nui's fell by 3.6% compared to June 2017. By the end of 2018, French Bee claimed to have attained 35% of the total market share between Paris and Papeete, compared to Air Tahiti Nui's 36% and Air France's 29%, and a 16% market share between the United States and Papeete, compared to Air Tahiti Nui's 52% and Air France's 12%.

Observers additionally felt that the infrastructure for tourism on the islands, including hotel vacancy or capacity on domestic inter-island services, would be unable to support the increase in visitors. While inbound tourism increased by 10.1% in June 2018 compared to June 2017 (particularly from Europe and the United States as a result of French Bee's new services), the demand for hotel capacity dropped by 2.5% compared to June 2017, with independent renters being projected to have absorbed or hosted additional capacity. In contrast to the increased tourist volume from Europe and the United States, tourism from Japan, Australia, and New Zealand dropped during the same period. After French Bee, United Airlines in December 2017 also announced the launch of its own services to Papeete from San Francisco for October 2018; and as United was also serving Paris Charles de Gaulle from San Francisco, it further increased competition and contributed additional capacity from the United States and Europe to the islands. While United's total market share between Paris and Papeete was not specified, French Bee claimed that United attained 20% of the total market share between the U.S. and Papeete by the end of 2018, although these figures did not include Hawaiian Airlines, a U.S.-based carrier that also operated Papeete services during the same period.

== Fleet ==
=== Current fleet ===
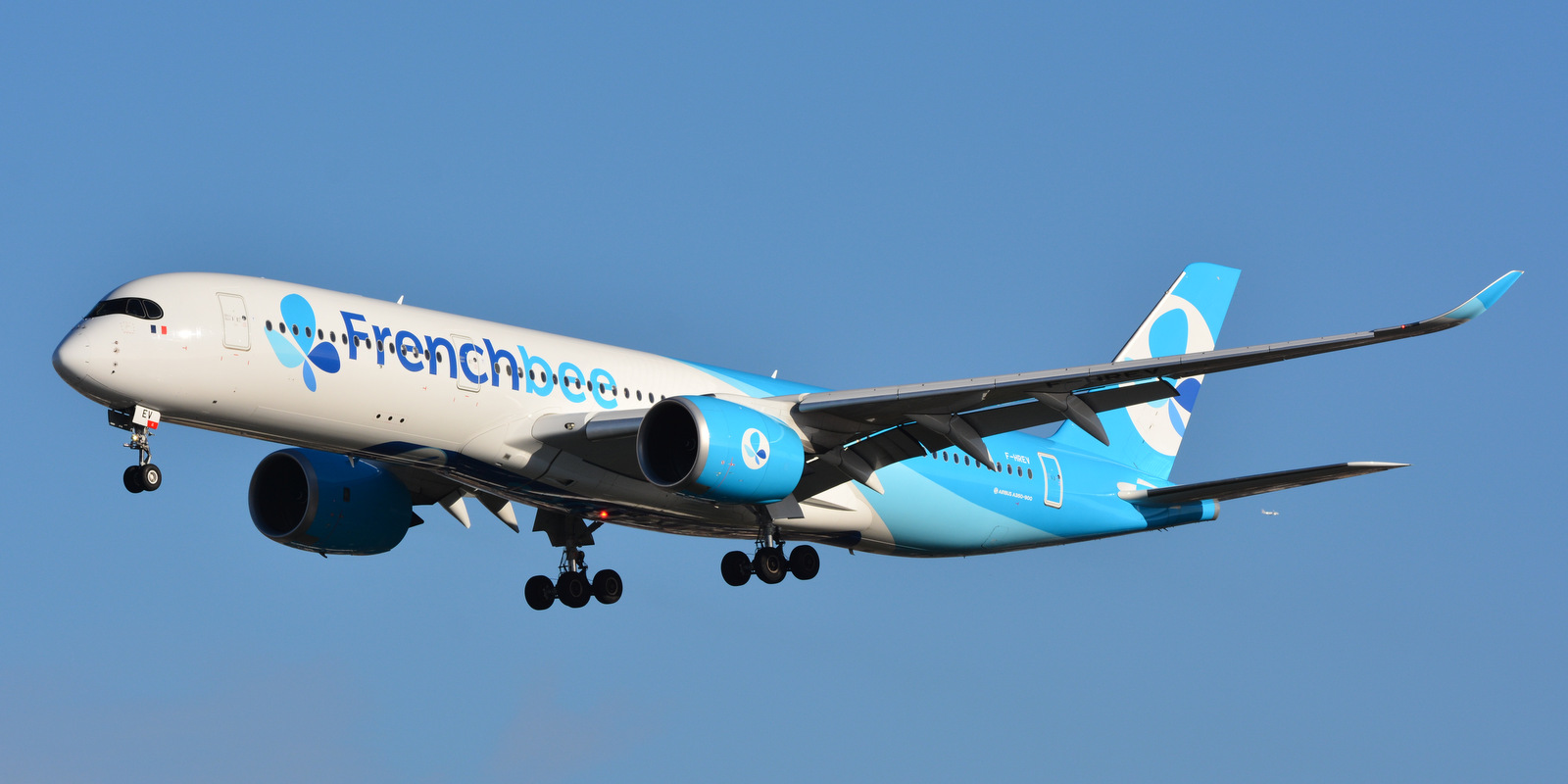
Airbus A350-900

As of July 2026, French Bee operates the following aircraft:

French Bee fleet
Aircraft	In service	Orders	Passengers			Notes
Aircraft	In service	Orders	W	Y	Total	Notes
Airbus A350-900	4	—	35	376	411	
Airbus A350-1000	2	—	40	440	480	
Total	6	—				

=== Former fleet ===
As of August 2025, French Bee operated 4 Airbus A350-900 and 2 Airbus A350-1000.

French Bee also previously operated the following aircraft:

French Bee former fleet
Aircraft	Total	Introduced	Retired	Notes
Airbus A330-300	1	2016	2019	Replaced by Airbus A350-900 and transferred to Air Caraïbes.

== Accidents and incidents ==
- On 24 August 2026, a ground worker at Montréal–Trudeau International Airport was killed after they were struck on the tarmac by a French Bee Airbus A350 preparing for a flight to Paris. Passengers on board witnessed the incident via cameras on the aircraft.

== See also ==
- List of airlines of France
