= Air Tahiti Nui =

Flag-carrier airline of French Polynesia

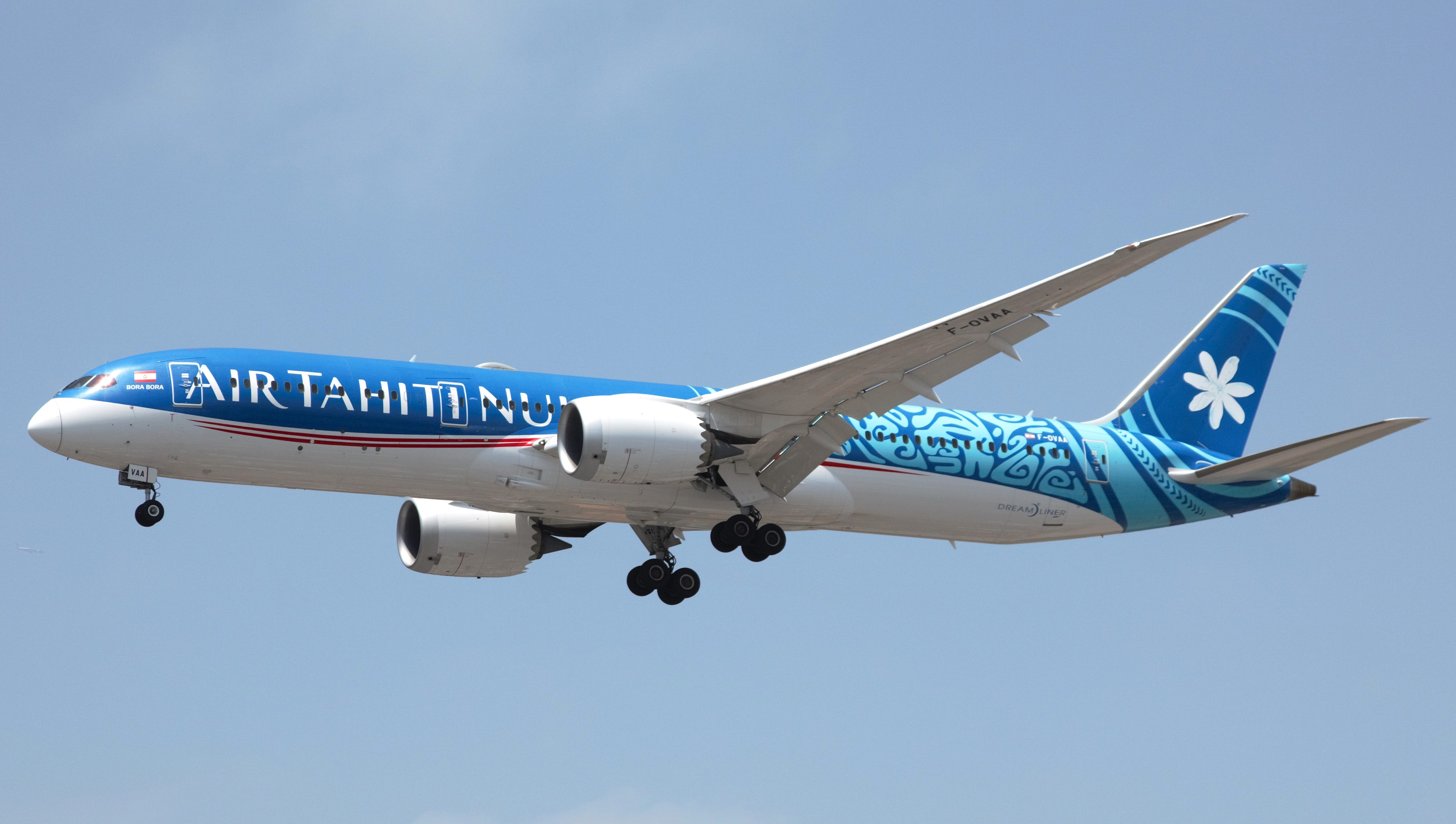
- Air Tahiti Nui Boeing 787-9
IATA	ICAO	Call sign
TN	THT	TAHITI AIRLINES
- Founded: 31 October 1996; 29 years ago
- Commenced operations: 20 November 1998; 27 years ago
- Hubs: Faaʼa International Airport
- Frequent-flyer program: Club Tiare
- Fleet size: 4
- Destinations: 5
- Parent company: Government of French Polynesia
- Headquarters: Fa'a'ā International Airport; Faʼaʼā, Tahiti, French Polynesia
- Key people: Michel Monvoisin (CEO)
- Operating income: ▲ F 39.2 billion (2024)
- Profit: ▲ F 438 million (2024)
- Total assets: ▼ F 39.4 billion (2024)
- Total equity: ▲ F 3.7 billion (2024)
- Employees: 708
- Website: airtahitinui.com

Air Tahiti Nui is the flag carrier of the French overseas collectivity of French Polynesia, with its head office and daily operations office on the property of Fa'a'ā International Airport in Faʼaʼā, Tahiti. It operates long-haul flights from its home base at Faaʼa International Airport, with a fleet consisting of four Boeing 787 Dreamliner aircraft.

== History ==
Air Tahiti Nui was established on 31 October 1996 and commenced flight operations on 20 November 1998. It was the first international long-haul airline based in French Polynesia, which was formed to develop inbound tourism. The Government of French Polynesia is the major shareholder (84.4%) along with other local investors. Air Tahiti Nui had 782 employees around 2007.

After years running a deficit, Air Tahiti Nui faced possible bankruptcy in 2011. The President of French Polynesia, Oscar Temaru, called for all eligible workers in the territory help bail out the carrier by voluntarily paying a third of their income into a rescue fund. After four years of deficit, the company started making profits again in 2015.

In May 2015, Air Tahiti Nui announced its intention to replace its entire fleet, then consisting of five Airbus A340-300 aircraft. They would be replaced by four Boeing 787-9 aircraft, which would be delivered in 2018 and 2019. Air Tahiti Nui operated its last A340 service in September 2019.

The Immeuble Tuarata, the head office of Air Tahiti Nui in Faaa, was inaugurated in 2018 by President Édouard Fritch, replacing the previous office in Papeete.

In April 2018, in anticipation of its new fleet of Boeing 787-9 aircraft, Air Tahiti Nui launched its redesigned brandmark and updated typography. The redesigned logo is a joint collaboration between Future Brand and Polynesian contemporary artist Alexander Lee. The re-drawn logo represents a tiare flower, the airline's emblem from the start of its history, depicted in a two-thirds view, with the profile of a vahine (woman, in Tahitian) in its pistil, a nod to Tahiti's reputation for beautiful women and flowers in the South Seas.

In March 2020, during the ongoing COVID-19 pandemic and as an impact of restrictions by the United States on international flights, Air Tahiti Nui operated the world's longest domestic flight with a lightly loaded Boeing 787-9. The aircraft flew nonstop from Faa'a International Airport serving Papeete to Charles de Gaulle Airport serving Paris, skipping the then-restricted intermediate stop at Los Angeles International Airport, and traversing a great-circle distance of 15,715 kilometres (9,765 mi) between the two airports, flying continuously for 15 hours 45 minutes. The airline's flights between Papeete and Paris were later adjusted to make technical stops interchangeably between Pointe-à-Pitre and Vancouver International Airport. Air Tahiti Nui's record was later eclipsed by French Bee in May 2020, which operated its own flight from Papeete to Paris, but to Orly Airport, covering a great-circle distance of 15,728 kilometres (9,773 mi).

== Destinations ==
As of March 2026, Air Tahiti Nui serves the following destinations:

Country or territory	City	Airport	Notes	Refs
Australia	Sydney	Sydney Airport	Resumes 14 December 2026	
France	Paris	Charles de Gaulle Airport		(Note: Flights between Tahiti and Paris currently stop at Los Angeles International Airport)
French Polynesia	Papeete	Faa'a International Airport	Hub	
Japan	Osaka	Kansai International Airport	Terminated	
Japan	Tokyo	Narita International Airport		
New Zealand	Auckland	Auckland Airport		
United States	Los Angeles	Los Angeles International Airport		
United States	New York City	John F. Kennedy International Airport	Terminated	
United States	Seattle	Seattle–Tacoma International Airport	Terminated	

=== Codeshare agreements ===
Out of date. Current list as of 3 APR 2026: Our airline partners | Air Tahiti Nui

Air Tahiti Nui has codeshare agreements with the following airlines:

- Aircalin
- Air France
- Air New Zealand
- Air Rarotonga
- Air Tahiti
- Alaska Airlines
- American Airlines
- Delta Air Lines
- Japan Airlines
- Korean Air
- LATAM Chile
- Qantas
- Vietnam Airlines

The airline also codeshares with the SNCF, the French national railway operator having also Interline agreements with

- Emirates
- Hahn Air
- WestJet

== Fleet ==
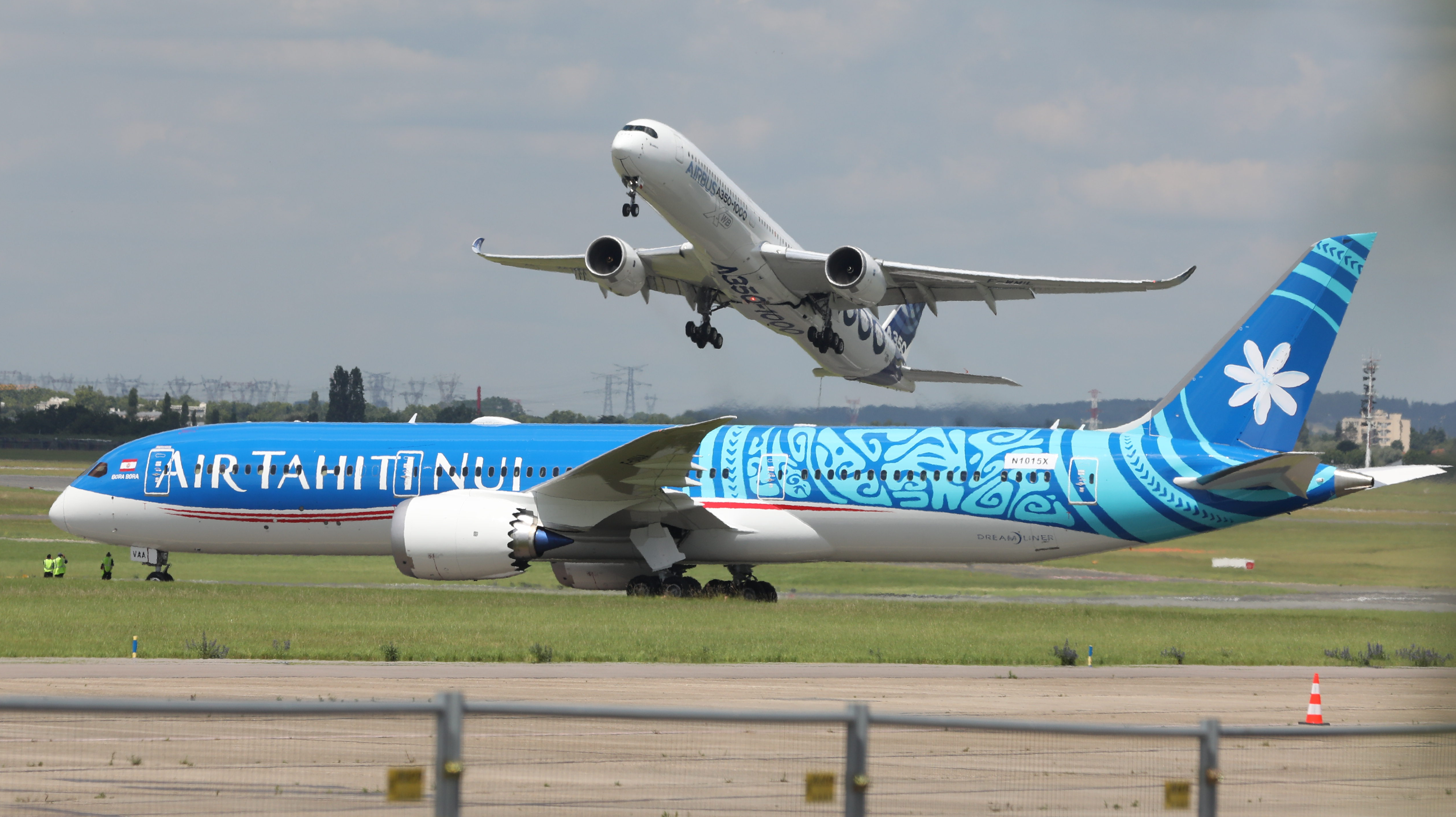
Air Tahiti Nui Boeing 787-9 during the 2019 Paris Air Show

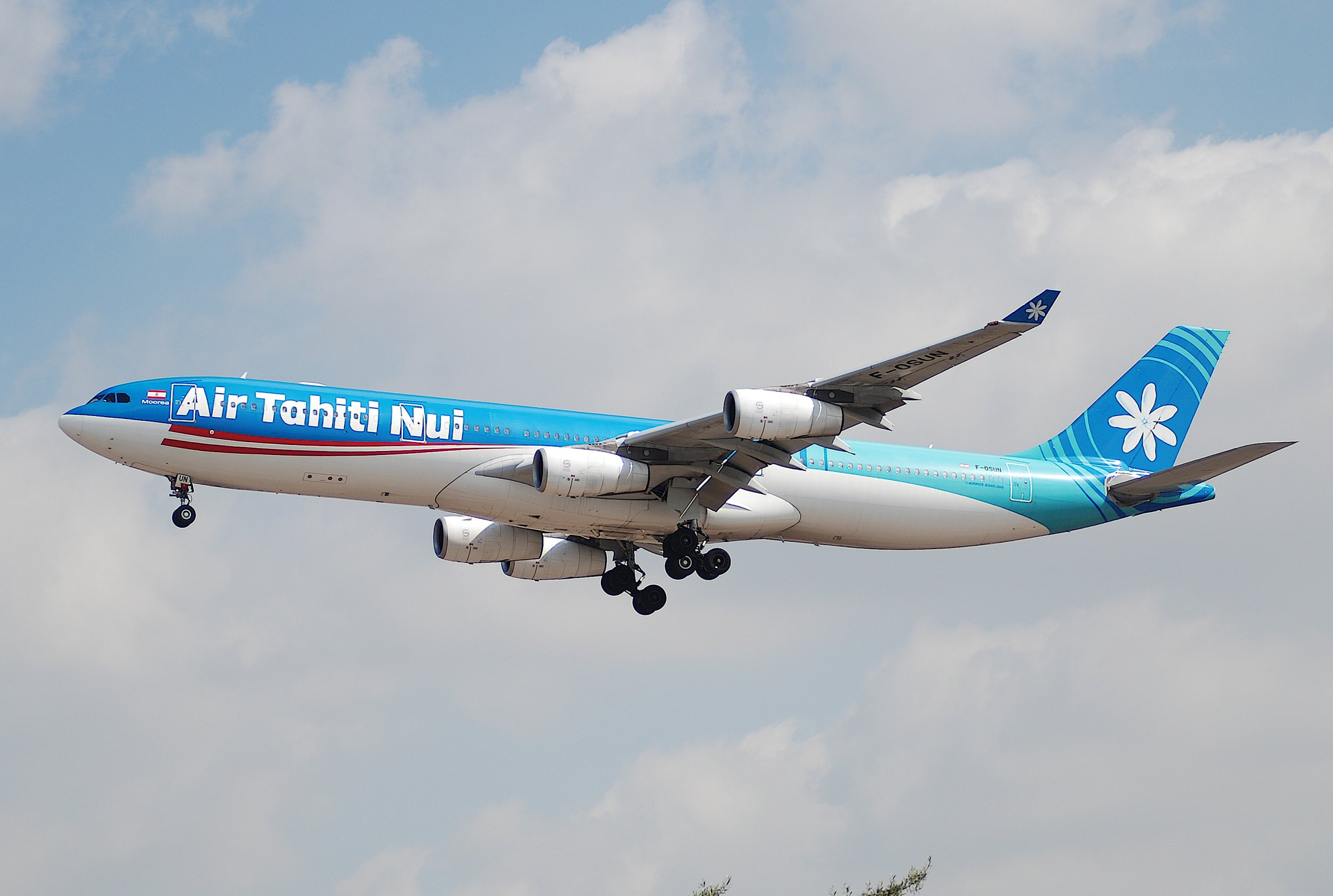
A former Air Tahiti Nui Airbus A340-300

=== Current fleet ===
As of July 2026, Air Tahiti Nui operates the following aircraft:

Air Tahiti Nui fleet
Aircraft	In service	Orders	Passengers				Notes
Aircraft	In service	Orders	J	W	Y	Total	Notes
Boeing 787-9	4	—	30	32	232	294	
Total	4	—					

=== Former fleet ===
Aircraft	Number	Introduced	Retired	Replaced By	Notes
Airbus A340-300	5	2001	2019	Boeing 787-9	

=== Livery ===
Air Tahiti Nui's aircraft livery over its history included different shades of blue representing the ocean, lagoon and sky of Tahiti for the upper half of the aircraft, extending the length of its fuselage, with white for the lower half as well as the aircraft's engines. The flag of French Polynesia is placed toward the front of the aircraft, behind the cockpit windows, with the aircraft's given name written underneath it. The flag is also incorporated into the livery's design, with red and white stripes that extend for part of the fuselage's length underneath the blue color. A tiare flower, the airline's logo, is placed onto the aircraft's vertical stabilizer (tailfin), with circular waves of alternating light and dark blues emanating from the flower, resembling water ripples.

With the introduction of the airline's Boeing 787-9 aircraft in October 2018, the airline's new livery incorporated markings derived from traditional Tahitian tattoos to the fuselage, the blue color used for most of the livery was changed to a darker shade, and the airline's name written on the forward fuselage was changed to the airline's new wordmark. However, despite the airline's tiare flower logo undergoing a visual change during the airline's overall rebranding, the logo used on the aircraft's tailfin was largely unchanged from the previous version.

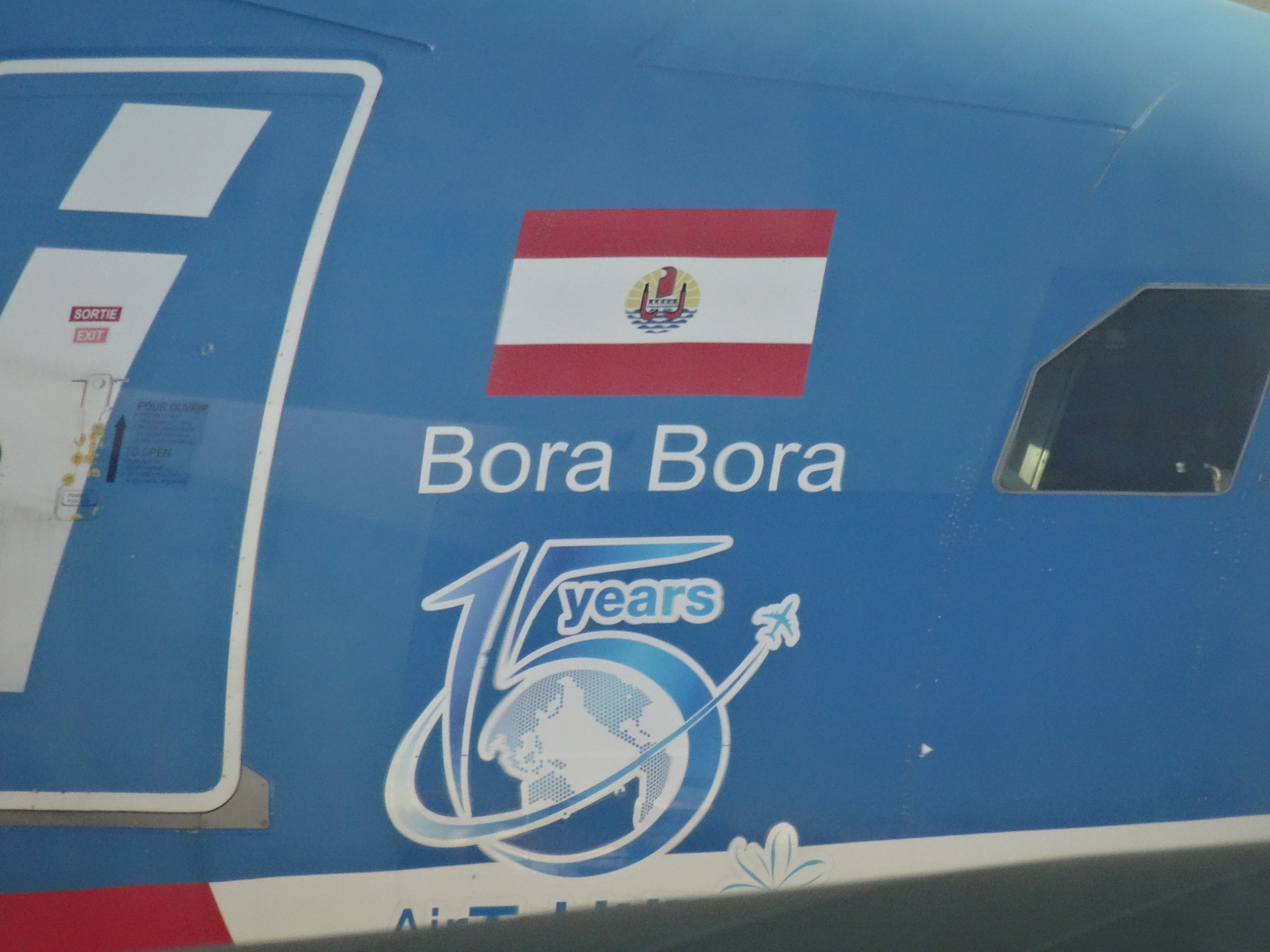
A closeup of an Air Tahiti Nui aircraft's titling

Air Tahiti Nui's names for its aircraft are predominantly derived from various islands and atolls across French Polynesia, including Bora Bora, Fakarava, Mangareva, Moorea, Nuku Hiva, Rangiroa and Tetiaroa. An exception is F-ONUI, a Boeing 787-9 named after Tupaia, a historical Tahitian navigator.
