= St Barth Commuter =

Barthélemois airline

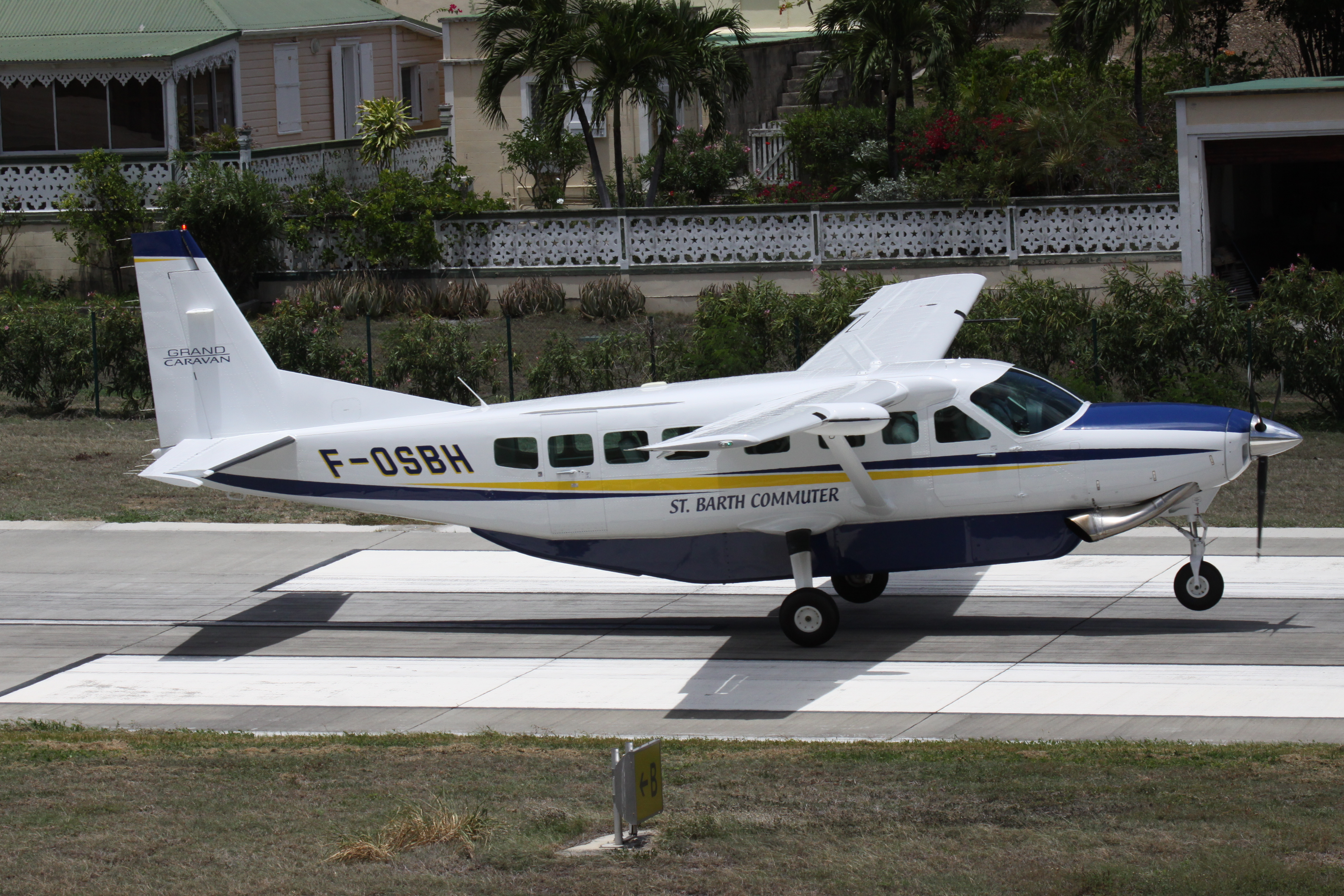
- Cessna 208B
IATA	ICAO	Call sign
PV	SBU	BLACK FIN
- Founded: 1995; 31 years ago
- Fleet size: 5
- Destinations: 20
- Headquarters: Saint-Barthélemy – Gustaf III Airport (SBH)
- Key people: Bertrand Magras
- Website: www.stbarthcommuter.com

St Barth Commuter is a French airline based in Saint-Barthélemy in the Caribbean.

== History ==
The airline was founded in 1995 and began services to Saint Maarten with a single Britten-Norman BN2A Islander. In 2005, the fleet was increased and new routes added to San Juan in Puerto Rico and to the French side of Saint Martin, Marigot. The airline is wholly owned by Bruno Magras.

== Destinations ==
St Barth Commuter flies to the following destinations:

Main base
Territory	Airport	Code
Saint Barthélemy	Remy de Haenen Airport	SBH

The airline has also regularly scheduled flights to other islands in the Caribbean.

Regular flights
Country/Territory	Airport	Code
(Collectivity of Saint Martin) Saint Martin	Grand Case–Espérance Airport	SFG
Sint Maarten	Princess Juliana International Airport	SXM
Guadeloupe	Pointe-à-Pitre International Airport	PTP
Martinique	Martinique Aimé Césaire International Airport	FDF

St Barth Commuter also does charter flights to other islands in the region.

Charter flights
Country/Territory	Island(s)
Anguilla	---
Antigua and Barbuda	Antigua, Barbuda
Barbados	---
British Virgin Islands	Tortola
(France) French West Indies	Guadeloupe, Martinique, Saint Martin
Grenada	---
(Netherlands) Dutch Caribbean	Sint Maarten, Sint Eustatius
Puerto Rico	---
Saint Kitts and Nevis	Saint Kitts, Nevis
Saint Lucia	---
United States Virgin Islands	Saint Croix, Saint Thomas

=== Codeshare agreements ===
St Barth Commuter currently has a Codeshare agreement with Air Caraibes.

== Fleet ==
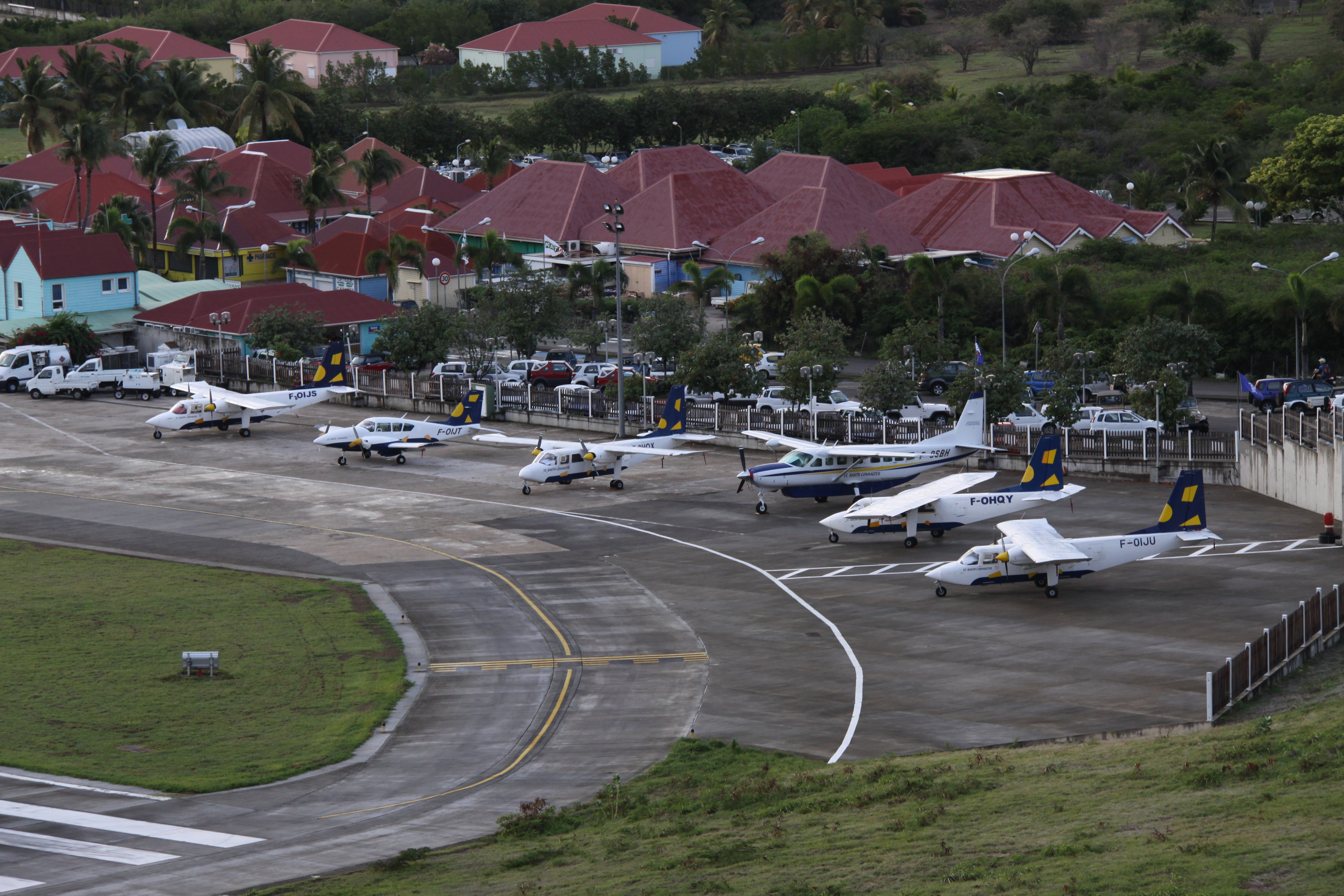
The fleet of St Barth Commuter (2010). As of 2024, all of the planes seen in this picture are retired from the airline.

The St Barth Commuter fleet consists of the following aircraft as of April 2024:

St Barth Commuter fleet
Aircraft	In Fleet
Cessna 208B Grand Caravan	5

=== Retired fleet ===
St Barth Commuter retired fleet
Aircraft	In Fleet
Britten-Norman BN2-B20 Islander	6
Piper PA-23	1
Cessna 208B Grand Caravan	1
