= Air Guadeloupe =

Airline of Guadeloupe (1969–2000)

IATA	ICAO	Call sign
OG	AGU	AIR GUADALOUPE
- Founded: 1969
- Ceased operations: July 2000
- Hubs: Pointe-à-Pitre International Airport
- Fleet size: 4
- Destinations: 11
- Headquarters: Les Abymes, Guadeloupe
- Key people: Francois Paneole (CEO)

Air Guadeloupe was a small French international airline with its head office in Les Abymes, Guadeloupe. At one time, it was on the property of Le Raizet Airport. Later it was located in the Immeuble Le Caducet.

== Company history ==
The small airline was founded on 21 May 1970 as Société Antillaise de Transport Aérien, SATA to soon become known as Air Guadeloupe. Operations began in 1994 and the CEO was Francois Paneole. In 2000 it was merged with Air Martinique, Air Saint Barthélémy, and Air Saint Martin to form Air Caraïbes.

== Destinations ==
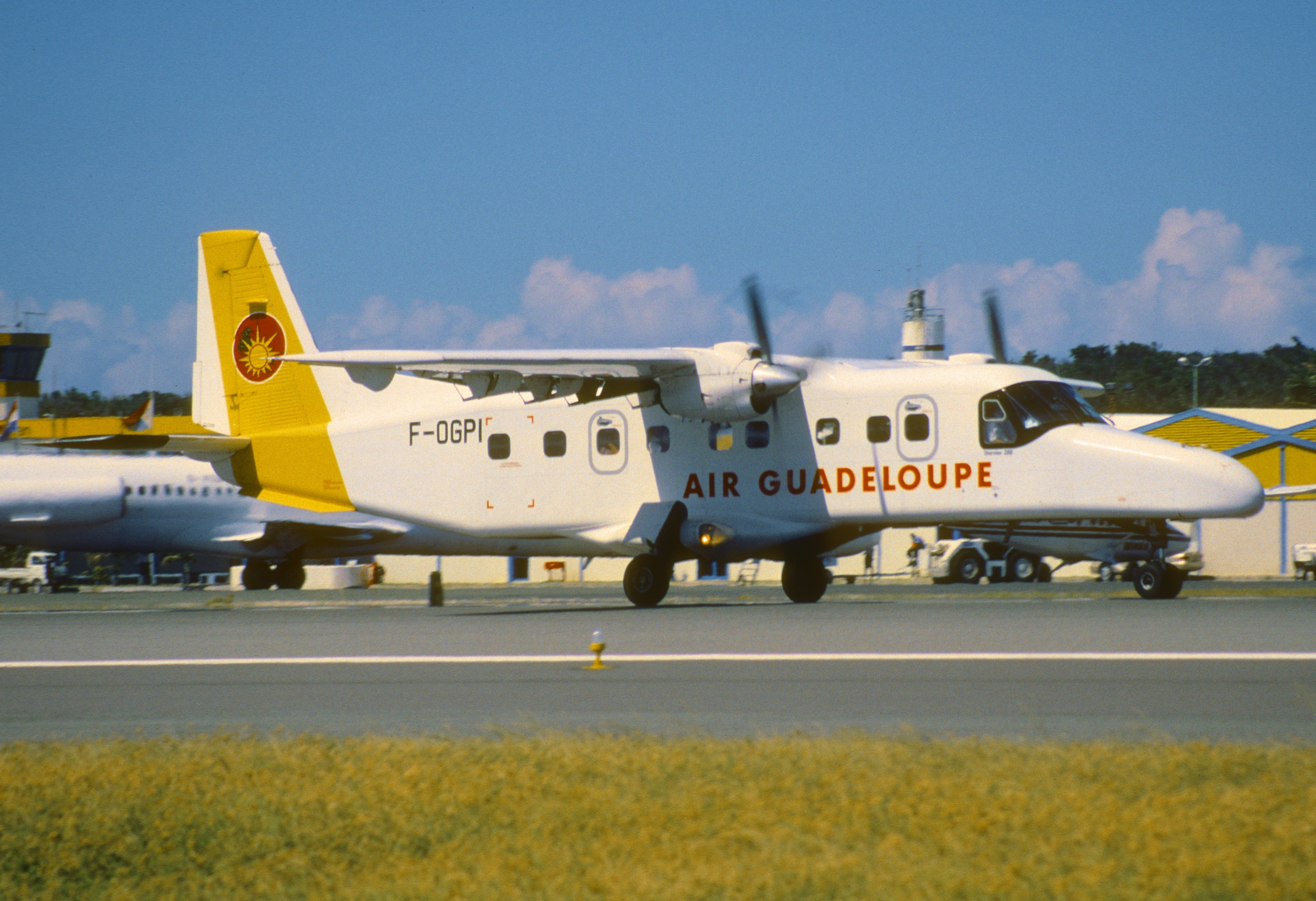
Air Guadeloupe Dornier 228 seen at Princess Juliana Airport in 1999.

- Dominica, Dominica - Canefield Airport
- Dominica, Dominica - Melville Hall Airport
- Fort De France, Martinique - Martinique Aimé Césaire International Airport
- Maria Galante, Guadeloupe - Marie-Galante Airport
- La Désirade, Gaudeloupe - La Désirade Airport
- Les Saintes, Guadeloupe - Les Saintes Airport
- Port-au-Prince, Haiti - Toussaint Louverture International Airport
- Santo Domingo, Dominican Republic - Las Américas International Airport
- Grand-Case, St-Martin - L'Espérance Airport
- San Juan, Puerto Rico - Luis Muñoz Marín International Airport
- St Maarten, Netherlands Antilles - Princess Juliana International Airport
- Cayenne, French Guiana Rochambeau - Cayenne-Rochambeau Airport

== Fleet ==
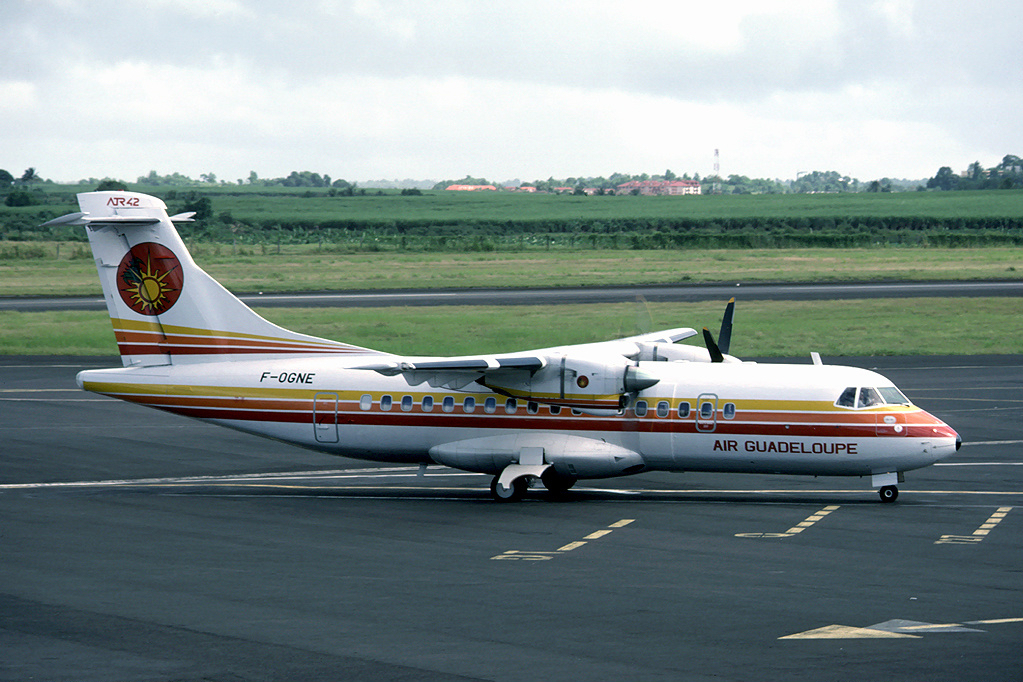
Air Guadeloupe ATR 42-300 at Pointe-a-Pitre. This aircraft later crashed while operating Total Linhas Aéreas Flight 5561.

Air Guadaloupe operated the following aircraft types at various times during its existence:

Air Guadaloupe fleet
Aircraft	Total	Introduced	Retired	Notes
ATR 42-300	2	1986	1999	
ATR 42-500	1	1986	2000	
ATR 72-200	2	1995	2000	
Boeing 737-200	1	1998	2000	Leased from Íslandsflug
Britten-Norman BN-2 Islander	6	1972	1990	
de Havilland Canada DHC-6 Twin Otter	7	1970	1999	
Douglas C-47 Skytrain	1	1978	1979	
Dornier 228	10	1988	2000	
Fairchild F-27	2	1980	1989	
Fairchild Hiller FH-227	1	1978	1980	

== Accidents and incidents ==
- 21 December 1972 - A Twin Otter operated a flight on behalf of Air France from Guadeloupe to St. Maarten, another island in the Caribbean. It crashed at night, near the island of St. Maarten. All 11 passengers and two crew members died.
- 18 November 1978 - A Twin Otter struck the water with its left wingtip while flying in a violent squall with a 200–300 feet ceiling. The aircraft crashed and sank in 13m of water. Fifteen of the 20 occupants (including one flight crew) died.

== See also ==
- List of defunct airlines of the Americas
