= Air Martinique =

Airline of Martinique

Air Martinique Societé Nouvelle Air Martinique
IATA	ICAO	Call sign
NN	MTQ	AIR MARTINIQUE
- Founded: 1974
- Ceased operations: July 2000
- Hubs: Martinique Aimé Césaire International Airport
- Destinations: 10 (1997)
- Headquarters: Fort-de-France, Martinique

Air Martinique was an airline based in the island of Martinique in the Lesser Antilles in the Caribbean. Its head office was on the grounds of Fort-de-France Airport, now Martinique Aimé Césaire International Airport, in Le Lamentin.

== History ==
Air Martinique was founded in 1974 as Compagnie Antillaise d'Affretments Aériens-CAAA. The official operating name from the early 1980s was Societé Nouvelle Air Martinique (S.N.A.M.).

In 1982, Air Martinique was operating regional service in the Caribbean with small Britten-Norman BN-2 Islander and de Havilland Canada DHC-6 Twin Otter aircraft with scheduled passenger service from Barbados, Dominica, Fort-de-France, Mustique, Saint Lucia, Saint Vincent (Antilles) and Union Island. The airline had previously operated Sud Aviation Caravelle jet service in the Caribbean region in 1980.

In 1993, Air Martinique was operating wide body McDonnell Douglas DC-10-30 transatlantic service between Fort-de-France and Pointe-a-Pitre in the French Caribbean and Paris Orly Airport. By 1995, the air carrier was continuing to operate regional services in the Caribbean (using the two letter "PN" IATA airline code at this time which had replaced the two letter "NN" airline code formerly used by Air Martinique) with flights to its headquarters base at the Fort-de-France airport on Martinique from Pointe-a-Pitre, Saint Lucia, Saint Maarten, Saint Vincent and Union Island operated with ATR 42 and Dornier 228 turboprop aircraft. In 1998, Air Martinique was operating Boeing 737-200 jet service to Miami.

In July 2000, Air Martinique was merged with Air Guadeloupe, Air St Barthélémy and Air St Martin to form Air Caraïbes.

== Destinations served in 1997 ==
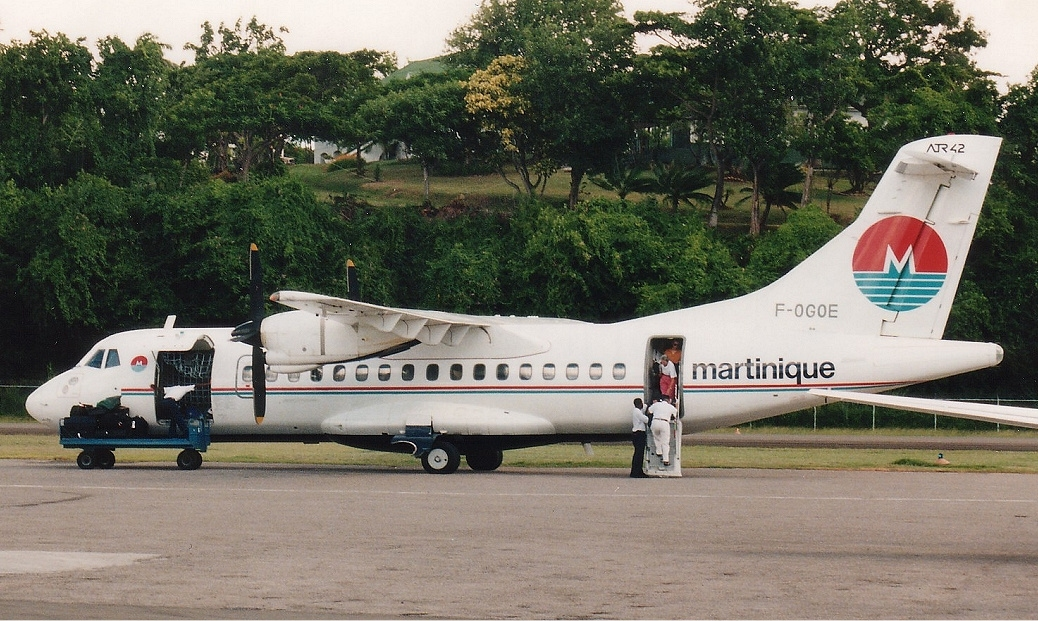
Air Martinique ATR 42-300 at George F. L. Charles Airport in 1997

- Fort-de-France, Martinique - Martinique Aimé Césaire International Airport Hub
- Dominica, Dominica - Canefield Airport
- Canouan Island, St. Vincent and the Grenadines - Canouan Airport
- Port-au-Prince, Haiti - Toussaint Louverture International Airport
- Pointe A Pitre, Guadeloupe - Pointe-à-Pitre International Airport
- Grand Case, Saint Martin - L'Espérance Airport
- Castries, Saint Lucia - George F. L. Charles Airport
- St Vincent, St. Vincent and The Grenadines - E.T. Joshua Airport
- Saint Maarten, Netherlands Antilles - Princess Juliana International Airport
- Union Island, St. Vincent and the Grenadines - Union Island Airport

== Fleet ==
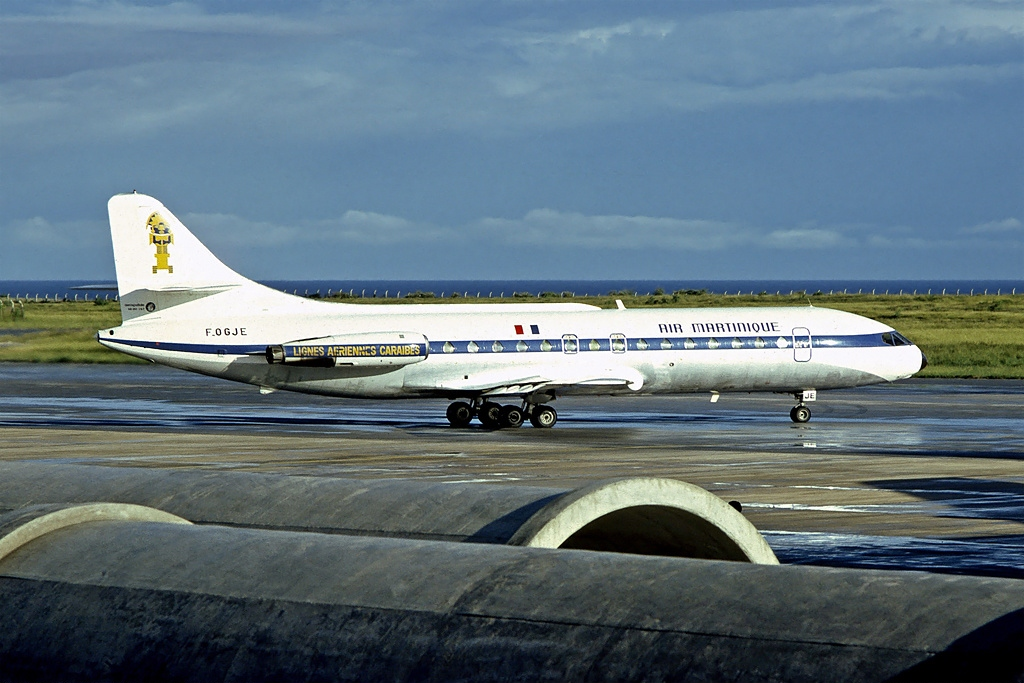
Air Martinique Sud Aviation Caravelle at Barbados Airport in 1980

Air Martinique operated the following aircraft types at various times during its existence:

Air Martinique fleet
Aircraft	Total	Introduced	Retired	Notes
ATR 42-300	4	1987	1999	
ATR 42-500	1	1998	2000	Leased from Air Guadeloupe
Beechcraft Model 99	1	1983	1988	
Boeing 737-200	1	1998	2000	Operated by Air Guadeloupe
Britten-Norman BN-2 Islander	4	1974	1986	
Britten-Norman Trislander	1	1975	1982	
de Havilland Canada DHC-6 Twin Otter	3	1981	1989	
Douglas C-47 Skytrain	2	1974	1983	
Dornier 228	3	1988	1999	
Fokker F27 Friendship	2	1980	1981	
Fairchild Hiller FH-227	1	1993	1993	
McDonnell Douglas DC-10-30	1	1992	1993	Leased from Equator Leasing
Sud Aviation Caravelle	2	1980	1981	

== See also ==
- List of defunct airlines of Martinique
