= Air Caraïbes =

French Caribbean regional airline

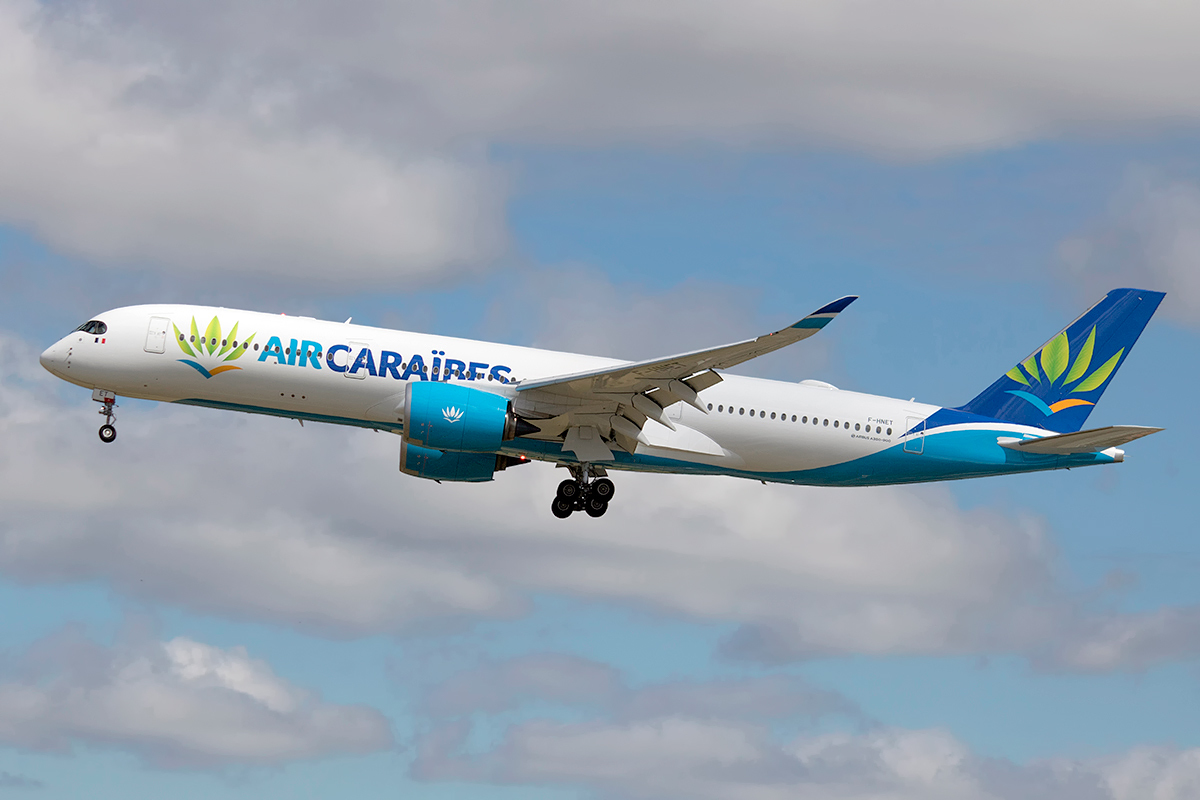
- Air Caraïbes Atlantique Airbus A350-900
IATA	ICAO	Call sign
TX	FWI	FRENCH WEST
- Founded: 1969; 57 years ago (as Société Antillaise de Transport Aérien)
- Commenced operations: July 2000; 26 years ago (as Air Caraïbes)
- Hubs: Paris–Orly; Pointe-à-Pitre
- Focus cities: Fort-de-France
- Frequent-flyer program: Preference
- Subsidiaries: Air Caraïbes Atlantique
- Fleet size: 13
- Destinations: 10
- Parent company: Groupe Dubreuil
- Headquarters: Les Abymes, Guadeloupe, France
- Key people: Eric Michel (Chairman); Muriel Assouline (Chairwoman)
- Employees: 1,144 (2021)
- Website: www.aircaraibes.com

Air Caraïbes (French pronunciation: [kaʁaib]) is a French West Indian airline, with its headquarters in Les Abymes, Guadeloupe. The airline's main base of operations is at Pointe-à-Pitre International Airport in Guadeloupe, with a focus city at Martinique Aimé Césaire International Airport, near Fort-de-France in Martinique. It operates scheduled and charter services in the West Indies, as well as transatlantic flights to and from Paris Orly Airport in Metropolitan France.

== History ==
The airline was originally established as Société Caribéenne de Transports Aériens, and started operations in September 1994. In 2000, Air Guadeloupe was acquired by Groupe Dubreuil, which had previously established Air Vendée before the airline was acquired by Air France, rebranding it as Regional Airlines. The current Air Caraïbes was founded in July 2000 through the merger of various local airlines Air Guadeloupe, Air Martinique, Air Saint Barthélémy, and Air Saint Martin, and was created in response to the air transport needs of the French Caribbean territories. In 2002, the company flew 445,000 passengers and had €68 million in revenues.

In July 2003, the airline received its first ATR 72-500. On 12 December 2003, the airline began services to Orly Airport from Guadeloupe and Martinique using an Airbus A330-200. The transatlantic services were operated under a franchise agreement by Air Caraïbes Atlantique, a jointly run subsidiary airline of Groupe Dubreuil, which was registered in Martinique with its own air operator's certificate, using an ICAO airline designator of "CAJ" and callsign of "CAR LINE". Its operations were further integrated with and operated under the airline codes of Air Caraïbes at a later date. In June 2006, Air Caraïbes expanded its Airbus A330 fleet in receiving its first Airbus A330-300, and also planned to receive another A330-300 to replace one of its A330s. Air Caraïbes sold one of its Airbus A330-200s to the French Air Force, where it was re-registered and became one of the French presidential planes.

On 13 December 2013, Air Caraïbes announced it had ordered the Airbus A350, with a fleet of three A350-900s and three A350-1000s, the first of which were expected to be delivered in 2016 and 2020 respectively. On 14 December 2016, the airline received its first ATR 72-600. The airline received its first A350-900 on 28 February 2017, and its first A350-1000 on 19 December 2019. However prior to the delivery of some of the airline's A350s, parent company Groupe Dubreuil allocated some to sister airline French Bee, before ordering additional A350s for both airlines by June 2019.

In 2024, the airline announced further fleet expansion plans with one A350-1000 and two ATR 72-600s to be delivered later in the year.

== Corporate affairs ==
Air Caraïbes is owned by Groupe Dubreuil (85%) and had 1,105 employees as of 2019. Air Caraïbes uses Travel Technology Interactive's airline management system, Aeropack.

== Destinations ==
Air Caraïbes operates both a regional network in the West Indies, and a transatlantic long-haul network based at Paris Orly Airport in France.

=== Codeshare agreements ===
Air Caraïbes has codeshare agreements with the following airlines:

- Air Corsica
- Caribbean Airlines
- Chalair Aviation
- Cubana de Aviación
- French Bee
- Iberia
- ITA Airways
- Sky High Aviation Services
- St Barth Commuter
- Sunrise Airways
- Winair

The airline also codeshares with the SNCF, the French national railway operator. Previously, Air Caraïbes also had codeshare agreements with Aigle Azur until the airline ceased operations in September 2019, and with Corsair International until 26 October 2019.

== Fleet ==
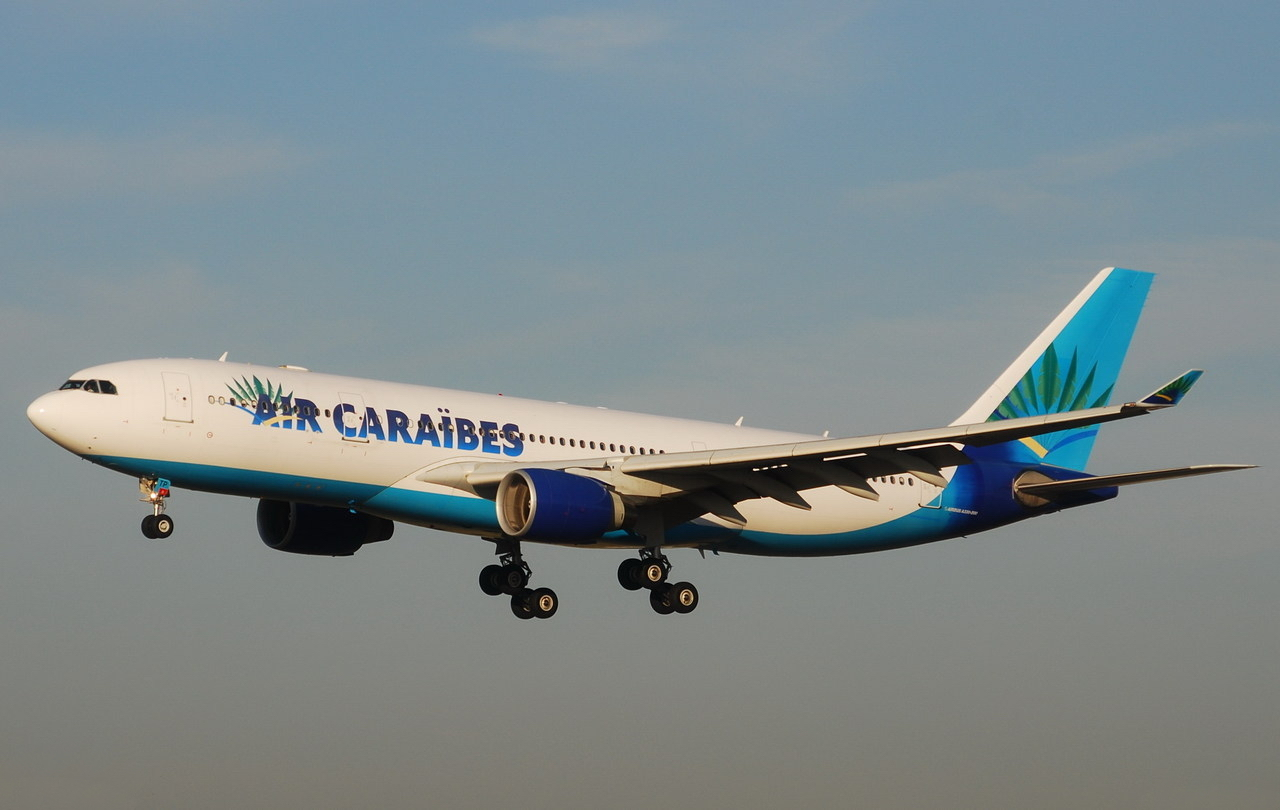
Air Caraïbes Airbus A330-200 in the previous livery

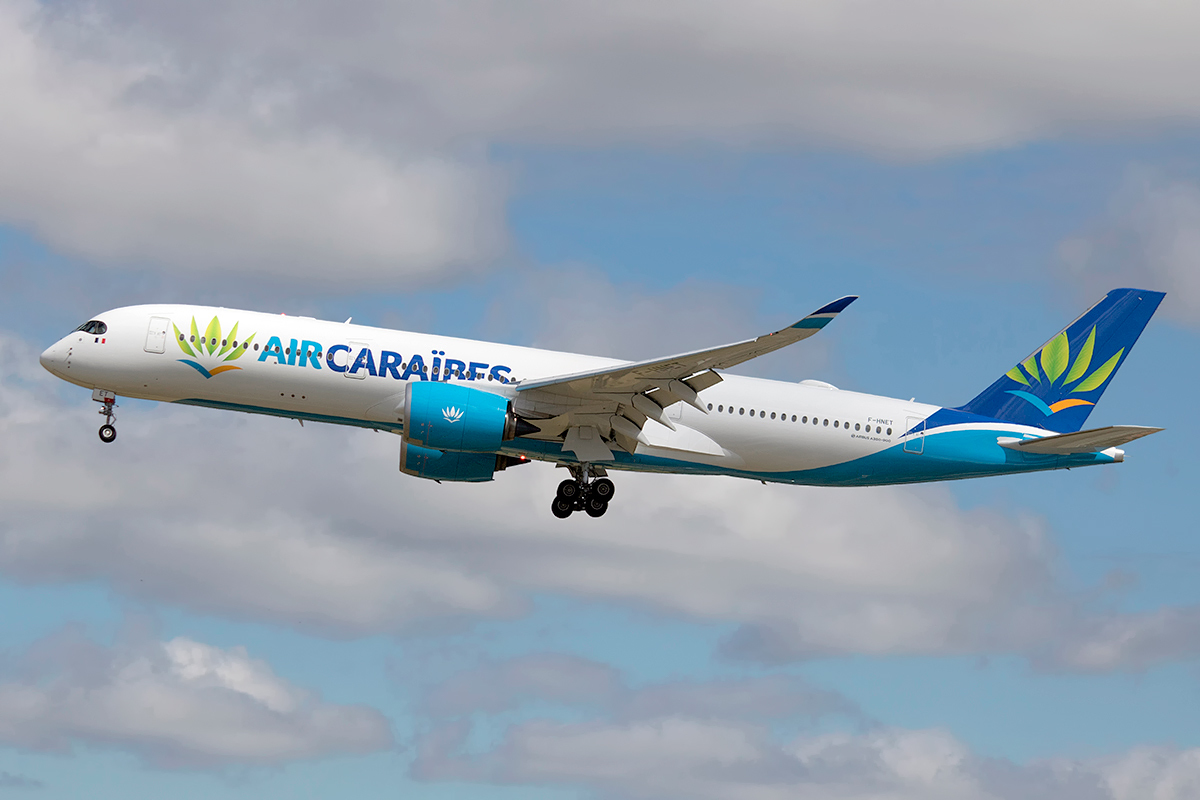
Air Caraïbes Airbus A350-900 in the current livery

=== Current fleet ===
As of July 2026, Air Caraïbes operates the following aircraft:

Air Caraïbes fleet
Aircraft	In service	Orders	Passengers				Notes
Aircraft	In service	Orders	J	W	Y	Total	Notes
Airbus A330-300	2	—	12	35	307	354	
Airbus A350-900	3	—	18	45	326	389	
Airbus A350-1000	4	—	24	45	360	429	
Airbus A350-1000	4	—	—	40	440	480	
ATR 72-600	4	1	—	—	74	74	
Total	13	1					

=== Former fleet ===
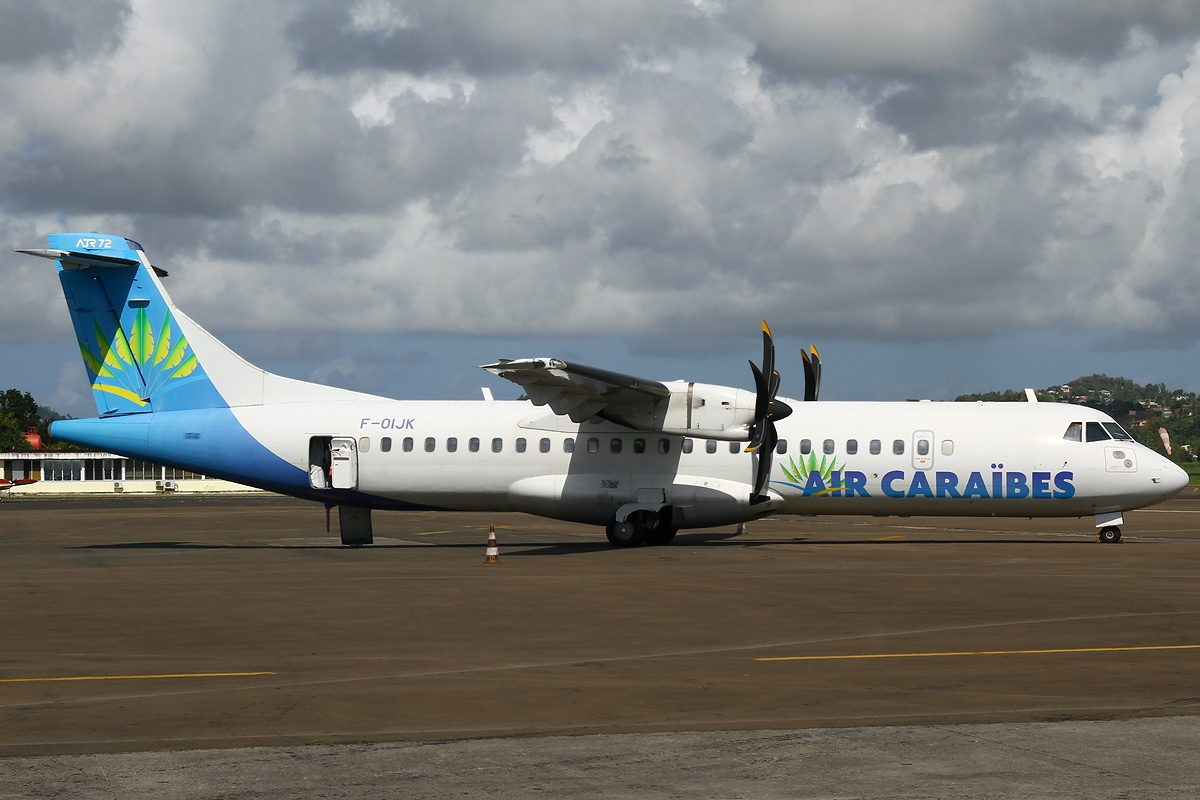
A former Air Caraïbes ATR 72-500

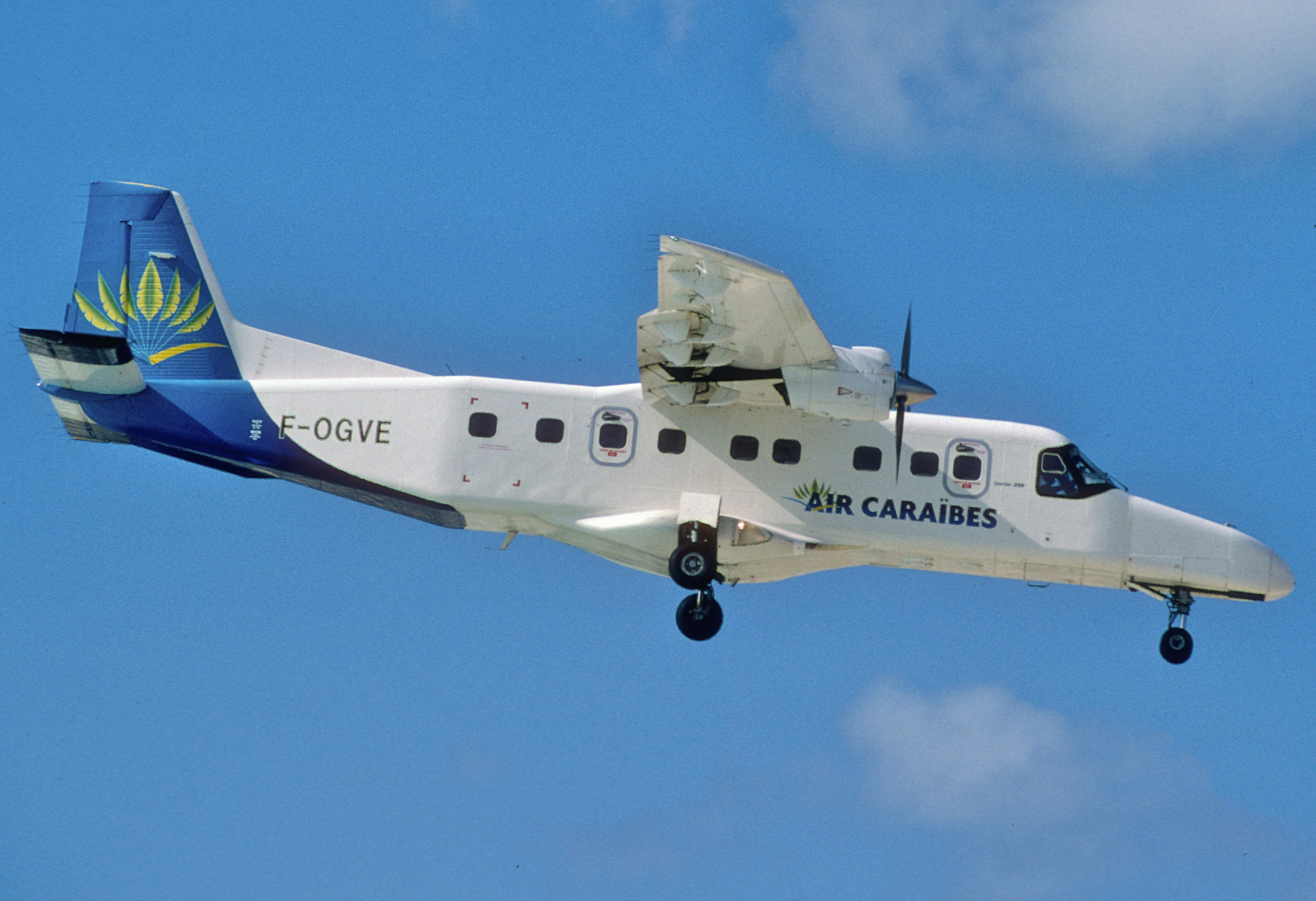
A former Dornier 228 in Air Caraïbes livery

As of August 2025, Air Caraïbes operated 1 Airbus A330-200, 2 Airbus A330-300, 3 Airbus A350-900, 1 Airbus A350-1000 and 4 ATR 72-600

Air Caraïbes and its franchised partners have operated the following aircraft types. It does not include aircraft types that were retired by its predecessor airlines prior to being merged to form Air Caraïbes.

Air Caraïbes former fleet
Aircraft	Total	Introduced	Retired	Notes
Airbus A330-200	1	2003	2009	Sold to French Air Force.
ATR 42-300	2	1986	1999	
ATR 42-500	2	1997	2007	
ATR 72-200	2	2000	2004	
ATR 72-500	4	2000	2020	
Boeing 737-300	1	2000	2001	Leased from Islandsflug.
Cessna 208 Caravan	5	Unknown	Unknown	Operated by Air Caraïbes Express.
de Havilland Canada DHC-6 Twin Otter	3	Unknown	Unknown	One crashed as Flight 1501.
Dornier 228	2	Unknown	Unknown	Operated by Air Caraïbes Express and Take Air.
Embraer ERJ-145	2	2000	2008	
Embraer ERJ-175	1	2006	2008	
Embraer ERJ-190	1	2007	2013	

== Accidents and incidents ==
- On 24 March 2001, Air Caraïbes Flight 1501 crashed into a house while on approach to Gustaf III Airport in Saint Barthélemy with 17 passengers and 2 crew members. All occupants were killed. One person on the ground was killed in the subsequent fire. The investigation concluded that the crash was caused by the pilot's error in managing the thrust lever. The report blamed the crew for accidentally entering the thrust into BETA range.

== See also ==
- List of airlines of France
