= Christine Ourmières-Widener =

French businesswoman

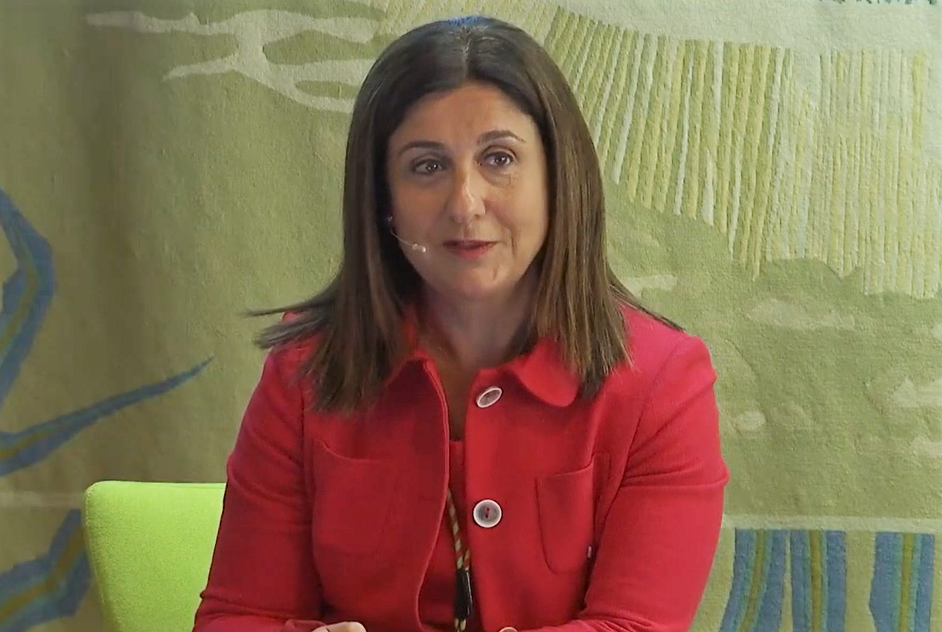
- Ourmières-Widener in 2022
- Born: 21 September 1964 (age 62); Avignon, France
- Citizenship: France; United Kingdom
- Education: ISAE-ENSMA; ESSEC
- Occupation: Former CEO of French Bee
- Known for: Commercial airline businesswoman

Christine Jeanne Ourmières-Widener FREng FRAeS (born 21 September 1964) is a French businesswoman known for her work in the commercial aviation industry. She was formerly the chief executive officer of French Bee, Flybe, CityJet, and TAP Portugal.

== Career ==
=== Early career ===
Ourmières-Widener worked at Air France from 1988, where she started in the maintenance team for the Concorde. Subsequently, she was appointed as the UK and Ireland Managing Director for Air France, she was then named Chief Executive of the Irish airline CityJet, after it was bought by Air France, from 1 October 2010 to 2015. She was for some time part of the European Regions Airline Association.

On 20 December 2016, it was announced that Ourmières-Widener was joining Flybe. She was the first woman elected to the board of 31 members. She had been appointed interim director on 24 April 2017, when Fernando Pinto stepped down.

=== Tap Air Portugal (2021–2023) ===
On 24 June 2021, Ourmières-Widener was appointed CEO of Portugal's flag carrier TAP Air Portugal.

During her tenant as CEO of TAP Air Portugal, the company went through restructuring and observed positive financial growth which was also boosted by the end of COVID-19 restrictions schemes on travel of passengers.

However, such endeavours were tarnished in 2022 with scandals, culminating with the Alexandra Reis case. Reis, a state secretary of Treasure who was a board member of TAP Air Portugal then dismissed by Ourmières-Widener without the latter publicly disclosing the nature of this action, left the company with agreement on a hefty severance pay (over €500,000, to compensate the remainder of her full 4-year term contract with paid holidays) to work on NAV, another state-subsidised institute, which evoked public outcry on Portuguese society.

Political pressure led to the dismissal of Pedro Nuno Santos, minister of the Ministry of Infrastructure and Housing, a cabinet directly involved with the ownership of TAP and who gave approval to the dismissal of Reis.

On 6 March 2023, weeks after the public inquiry in the Portuguese Parliament about the Alexandra Reis case, and the final audit report from IGF (Inspeção-Geral de Finanças), the government dismissed her from executive duties with no severance pay. In September 2023, Ourmières-Widener filed a lawsuit with the Central Civil Court of Lisbon to claim over 5.9 million euros ($6.3 million) in compensation.

=== French Bee (2023–2025) ===
Ourmières-Widener was appointed CEO of French Bee, a French long-haul low-cost airline, and president of Air Caraïbes in 2023. On 21 January 2025, the Dubreuil group, the holding company of French Bee and Air Caraïbes, announced the end of their collaboration with Ourmières-Widener.

ZeroAvia (2026-)

was appointed CEO of ZeroAvia.

Business positions
Preceded by Saad Hammad	CEO of Flybe; January 2017 - July 2019	Succeeded by Ceased operations
Preceded by Geoffrey O’Byrne White	CEO of CityJet; October 2010 – 2015	Succeeded by Pat Byrne as Executive Chairman
