= Take Air =

Airline based in Martinique

- Commenced operations: December 2006
- Operating bases: Martinique

Take Air is an all-you-can-fly airline based in Martinique. It operates scheduled services in the Caribbean.

== History ==
Take Air was founded in Martinique on 14 March 2003 by Boris Challe, Samuel Vivares, Jean-Marc Merlin, and Jean-Guy Rochambreau. Samuel Vivares became its managing director. Founders were already partners in the aircraft handling company Trans Services Antilles, based at Lamentin Airport in Fort-de-France.

In December 2006 and on 18 March 2007, two Let L-410 Turbolet aircraft were delivered to Take Air Lines.

In February 2007, the four partners sold their shares to Joseph Belliard, an entrepreneur based in Martinique.

After experiencing financial difficulties for several months, the airline was placed into judicial reorganisation on 26 June 2007.

The only bid for takeover submitted within the deadline came from the European and American investor group Hermes. The consortium planned to continue operations by providing services between smaller islands in the Caribbean, but the Commercial Court of Fort-de-France deemed the proposal unviable.

The company was subsequently placed into liquidation on 6 September 2007 by the Commercial Court of Fort-de-France.

== Destinations ==
Take Air operates scheduled charter flights connecting Martinique with Saint Martin, Antigua, Guadeloupe, Dominica, Saint Lucia, St Vincent, Canouan and Union Island.

== Fleet ==
At March 2007 the Take Air fleet includes:

Take Air Fleet
| Aircraft | In Fleet | Notes |
|---|---|---|
| Let L-410 UVP-E20 | 2 | |
