= Pointe-à-Pitre International Airport =

International airport on the French Caribbean island territory of Grande-Terre

Guadeloupe Maryse Condé Airport Aéroport Guadeloupe Maryse Condé
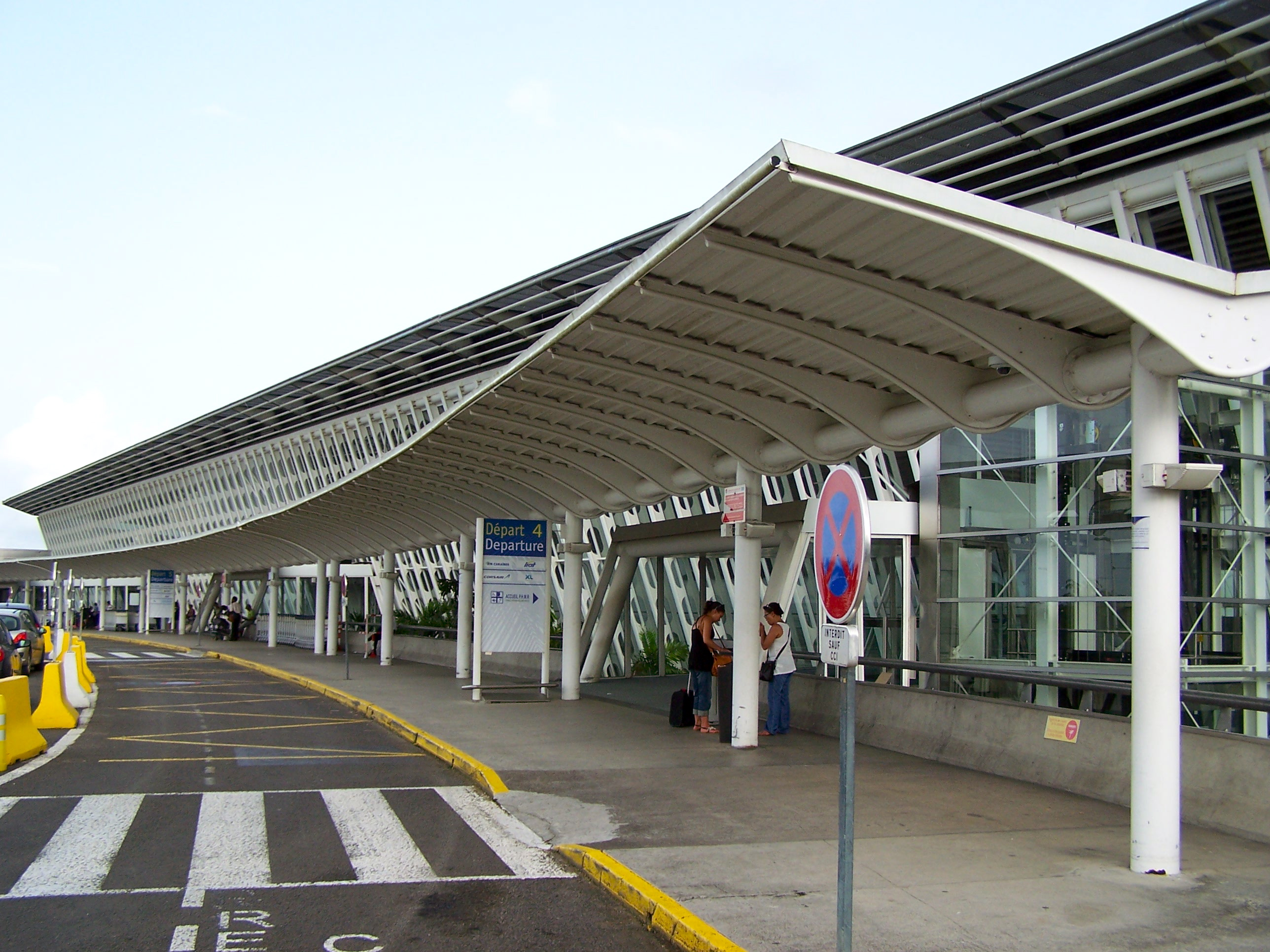
- IATA: PTP; ICAO: TFFR

Summary
- Airport type: Public
- Operator: CCI de Pointe à Pitre
- Serves: Pointe-à-Pitre, Grande-Terre, Guadeloupe
- Location: Abymes
- Hub for: Air Caraïbes
- Focus city for: Air France
- Elevation AMSL: 35 ft (11 m)
- Coordinates: 16°15′51″N 061°31′33″W
- Website: guadeloupe.aeroport.fr

Map
- Location in Guadeloupe PTP (the Caribbean)

Runways
Direction	Length		Surface
Direction	m	ft	Surface
12/30	3,129	10,266	Asphalt

Statistics (2025)
- Total Passengers: 2,193,878
- Aircraft movements: 25 402
- Sources: AIP, UAF, Airport,

Guadeloupe Maryse Condé Airport, otherwise known as Pointe-à-Pitre International Airport or (French: Aérodrome de Pointe-à-Pitre Le Raizet) (IATA: PTP, ICAO: TFFR) is an international airport serving Pointe-à-Pitre on the island of Grande-Terre in Guadeloupe, France.

The airport is located in Abymes, 2.4 km (1.3 NM) north-northeast of Pointe-à-Pitre. It is the main hub for Air Caraïbes. Air France also has two Airbus A320 based in Pointe-à-Pitre for regional flights. It is the largest of the six airports in the archipelago. In 2019, the airport handled 2,488,782 passengers; it is the second busiest airport in the Lesser Antilles after Queen Beatrix International Airport located in Aruba, and before Grantley Adams International Airport located in Barbados.

== Facilities ==
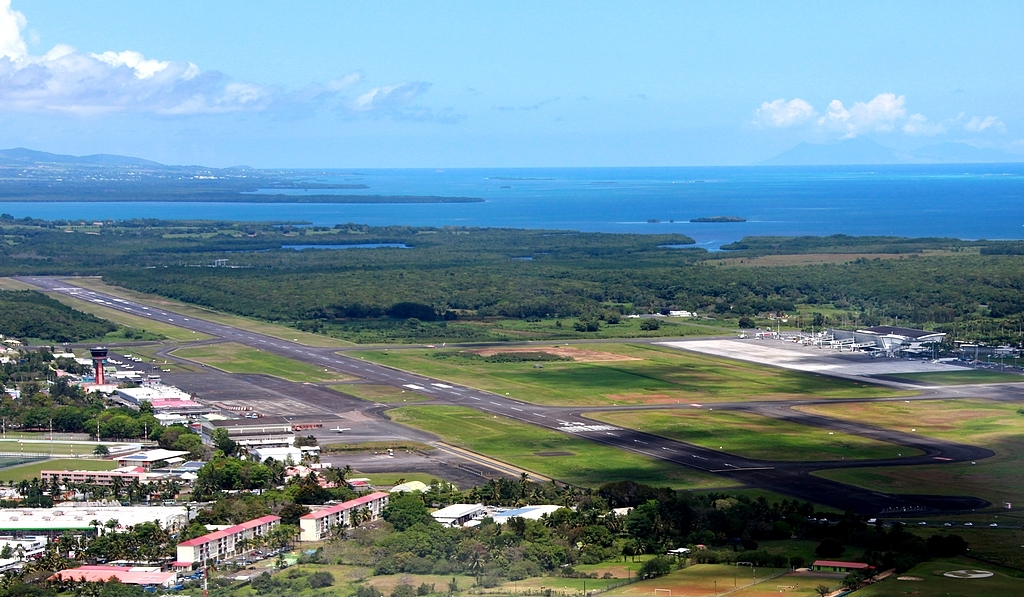
Aerial view

The airport is at an elevation of 35 ft (11 m) above mean sea level. It has one paved runway designated 12/30 which measures 3,125 m × 45 m (10,253 ft × 148 ft). Runway 12/30 is long enough to allow aircraft as large as the A380 to take off and land without difficulty. The airport was also one of the first to handle the first A380 prototype in the second week of January 2006, for two days. The same year, the airport celebrated its 40th anniversary. The airport has two interconnected terminals, Terminal 1 and Terminal 2. Terminal 1 serves both international and regional flights. Terminal 2 only serves regional flights.

The former Air Guadeloupe had its head office at the airport.

== Airlines and destinations ==
Airlines	Destinations
Air Canada	Montréal–Trudeau; Seasonal: Québec City (begins December 17, 2026), Toronto–Pearson
Air Caraïbes	Fort-de-France, Paris–Orly, Saint Barthélemy, St. Maarten (begins 8 January 2027), St. Martin
Air France	Cayenne, Fort-de-France, Miami, Paris–Charles de Gaulle; Seasonal: St. Maarten
Air Transat	Montréal–Trudeau; Seasonal: Québec City
American Airlines	Miami
Caribbean Airlines	Barbados, Castries, Dominica–Douglas-Charles, Port of Spain
Corsair International	Paris–Orly; Seasonal: Nantes
Liat Air	Antigua
Neos	Seasonal: Milan–Malpensa
Sky High	Santo Domingo–Las Américas
St Barth Commuter	Saint Barthélemy
Sunrise Airways	Antigua, Cap-Haïtien, Dominica–Douglas-Charles, Port-au-Prince, Santo Domingo–Las Américas

== Statistics ==
Annual passenger traffic (enplaned + deplaned), 2000 - 2023

Year	Passengers	Year	Passengers	Year	Passengers
2000	2,117,232	2010	1,948,813	2020	1,269,864
2001	1,896,044	2011	2,050,471	2021	1,279,263
2002	1,805,420	2012	1,994,575	2022	2,077,233
2003	1,761,455	2013	2,033,763	2023	2,151,369
2004	1,866,739	2014	2,029,080	2024	2,149,887
2005	1,836,490	2015	2,089,763	2025	2,193,878
2006	1,861,362	2016	2,253,284	2026	
2007	1,960,912	2017	2,361,173	2027	
2008	2,020,042	2018	2,446,234	2028	
2009	1,839,786	2019	2,488,782	2029	

10 busiest routes from Guadeloupe Pôle Caraîbes Airport in 2020

Rank	City	Passengers	Top carriers
1	Paris Orly, France	1,224,015	Air France, Air Caraïbes, Corsair
2	Fort de France, France (Martinique)	427,920	Air France, Air Caraïbes, Air Antilles Express
3	Saint Martin Grand Case, France	166,072	Air Caraïbes, Air Antilles Express
4	Paris CDG, France	86,166	XL Airways
5	Cayenne, France (French Guiana)	47,811	Air France
6	Montréal, Canada	37,249	Air Canada, Air Transat (seasonal)
7	Port-au-Prince, Haîti	35,303	Air France
8	Saint Barthelemy, France	34,814	Air Antilles Express
9	Miami, USA	31,201	Air France, American Airlines
