= Martinique Aimé Césaire International Airport =

Airport serving Fort-de-France, Martinique

Martinique Aimé Césaire International Airport Aéroport international de Martinique-Aimé-Césaire
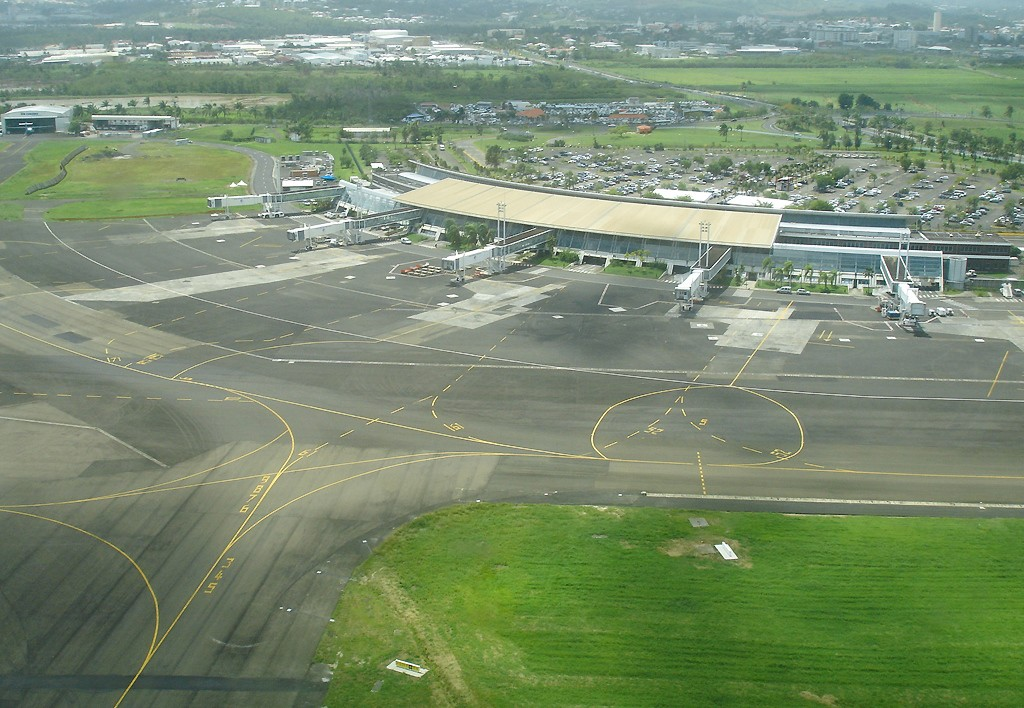
- IATA: FDF; ICAO: TFFF

Summary
- Airport type: Public
- Operator: Aéroports Français
- Serves: Fort-de-France, Martinique
- Location: Le Lamentin
- Opened: 1950; 76 years ago
- Focus city for: Air Caraïbes; Air Antilles Express
- Elevation AMSL: 16 ft (4.9 m)
- Coordinates: 14°35′32″N 060°59′47″W

Map
- Location in Martinique

Runways
Direction	Length		Surface
Direction	m	ft	Surface
10/28	3,000	9,843	Asphalt

Statistics (2023)
- Passengers: 1,859,392
- Passenger traffic change: ▲6.1%
- Aircraft movements: 14,746
- Aircraft movements change: ▼5.3%
- Sources: French AIP, Aeroport.fr

Martinique Aimé Césaire International Airport (French: Aéroport international de Martinique-Aimé-Césaire, pronounced [maʁtinik ɛme sezɛːʁ]) (IATA: FDF, ICAO: TFFF) is an international airport of Martinique in the French West Indies. Located in Le Lamentin, a suburb of the capital Fort-de-France, it was opened in 1950 and renamed in 2007, after author and politician Aimé Césaire.

== Facilities ==
The airport is at an elevation of 16 ft (5 m) above mean sea level. It has one runway designated 10/28 with an asphalt surface measuring 3,000 m × 45 m (9,843 ft × 148 ft). When Air Martinique existed, its headquarters were located on the airport property. The runway is of a length that can accommodate large jets, including 747s from France. On at least two occasions, the Concorde flew from Paris and landed at the airport in Martinique.

Passenger facilities include police, customs, baggage claim, pharmacy, vaccination bureau, handicap facilities, tobacconist, bank, money changing, souvenir shops, tax-free shopping, gift shop, florist, hairdresser, car rentals, taxi, parking, restaurants, cafés and bars, and two hotels. Gates 1-9 have jetways; gates 10-16 use a common waiting area and boarding by stairs.

Cargo facilities include a 747 freighter dock, bonded warehouse, transit zone, mechanical handling, heated storage, refrigerated storage, mortuary, fresh meat inspection, health officials, very large/heavy cargo, and an express/courier centre.

== Airlines and destinations ==
Airlines	Destinations
Air Adelphi	Castries, St. Vincent–Argyle
Air Canada	Montréal–Trudeau; Seasonal: Québec City, Toronto–Pearson
Air Caraïbes	Paris–Orly, Pointe-à-Pitre, St. Martin
Air France	Cayenne, Paris–Charles de Gaulle, Pointe-à-Pitre
Air Transat	Montréal–Trudeau, Québec City; Seasonal: Toronto–Pearson
American Airlines	Miami
Caribbean Airlines	Castries, Barbados, Port of Spain
Corsair International	Paris–Orly; Seasonal: Bordeaux
InterCaribbean Airways	Barbados (begins 25 January 2027)
ITA Airways	Seasonal charter: Rome–Fiumicino
Sky High	Santo Domingo–Las Américas
Sunrise Airways	Antigua, Barbados, Castries

== Accidents and incidents ==
- 30 August 1979: an IRMA/Britten Norman BN-2A-8 Islander (F-OGGL) of Air Martinique was damaged beyond repair while standing, likely from Hurricane David.
- 17 July 1994: an IRMA/Pilatus Britten-Norman BN-2B-26 Islander (8P-TAD) of Air Martinique leased from Trans Island Air crashed into Les Pitons du Cabbets at 21:45, 13 km (8.1 miles) NNW of Fort-de-France while on approach from Bridgetown, killing all 6 occupants. The plane crashed just 15 feet below the hills' 2795 foot summit. The cause was found to be pilot failure.
- 10 October 2024: Protesters occupied the airport tarmac overnight and tried to enter the terminal, disrupting several flights and trapping hundreds of passengers.
