= Mustique Airport =

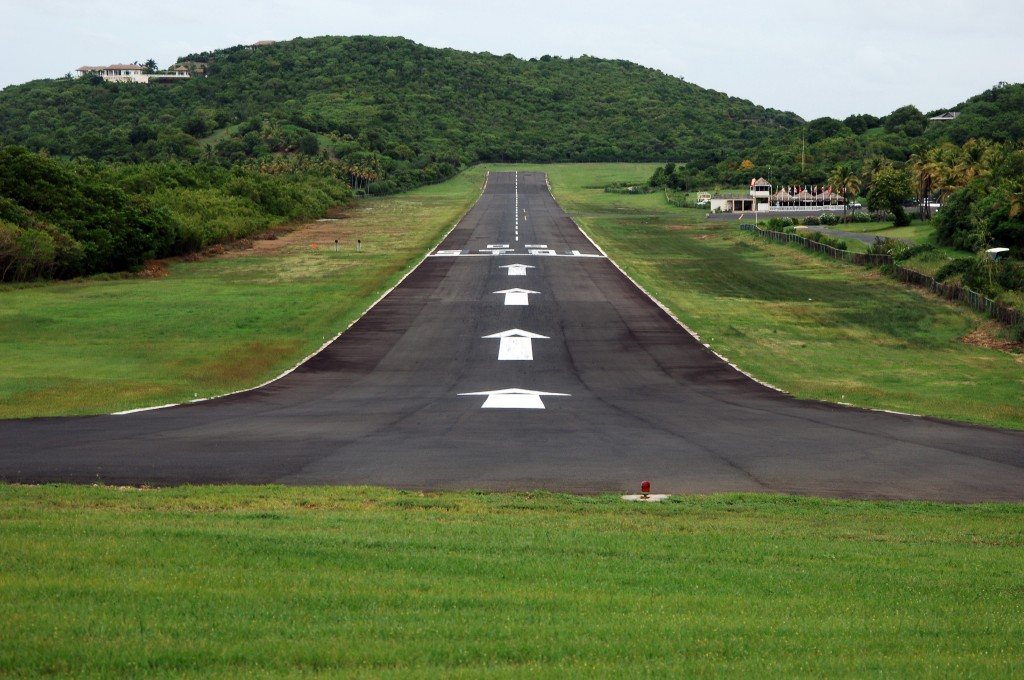
- IATA: MQS; ICAO: TVSM

Summary
- Airport type: Public-private
- Owner: Mustique Company
- Operator: Mustique Company
- Location: Mustique, Saint Vincent and the Grenadines
- Opened: 1969; 57 years ago
- Hub for: Mustique Airways; Air Adelphi
- Focus city for: SVG Air
- Time zone: AST (UTC−04:00)
- Elevation AMSL: 8 ft (2.4 m)
- Coordinates: 12°53′17″N 061°10′49″W
- Website: http://mustique.com/

Map
- Location in Saint Vincent and the Grenadines

Runways
| Direction | Length | | Surface |
| Direction | m | ft | Surface |
|---|---|---|---|
| 09/27 | 992 | 3,255 | Asphalt |
- Source: DAFIF

Mustique Airport (IATA: MQS, ICAO: TVSM) is a private airfield owned by the Mustique Company for public use and is located on Mustique island, part of Saint Vincent and the Grenadines in the Caribbean Sea. It is used by civil aviation and national airlines using turboprop planes.

The traffic has a large seasonal variation with many more passengers in the winter.

The airport has a single asphalt runway, designated 09/27. This label means that it is numbered based on its magnetic heading, rounded to the nearest 10 degrees and dropping the last digit. Because a runway has two ends, it gets two numbers that identify the direction of the runway end for pilots to identify which direction they are taking off or landing, with 09 being due east and 27 due west.

The airport has a short takeoff and landing (STOL) runway with a displaced threshold, thus limiting the aircraft types allowed to land. Single-engine light aircraft such as the Cessna 152, Cessna 172, and twin-engine light aircraft such as the Beechcraft King Air, the larger Beechcraft Super King Air or the well-known de Havilland Canada DHC-6 Twin Otter can easily land there.

The runway is unlit and the airstrip lacked an instrument landing system, radar and other radio navigation aids – used for landings in poor weather. As such, it could normally only support good weather Visual Flight Rules (VFR) daylight operations, in weather conditions generally clear enough to allow the pilot to see where the aircraft is going. Specifically, the weather must be better than basic VFR weather minima, i.e. in visual meteorological conditions (VMC), as specified in the rules of the relevant aviation authority. The pilot must be able to operate the aircraft with visual reference to the ground and by visually avoiding obstructions and other aircraft.

Mustique Airport is the oldest continuously operated airport in St. Vincent and the Grenadines since the closure of E. T. Joshua Airport and the only privately owned airport in the country. It is one of five airports in the multi-island nation of St. Vincent and the Grenadines, the others being Argyle International Airport in St. Vincent, J. F. Mitchell Airport in Bequia, Canouan Airport and Union Island Airport.

SVG Air is a national airline of St. Vincent and the Grenadines, along with Mustique Airways. SVG Air and Mustique Airways have combined to form a SVG Air / Grenadine Air Alliance, operating 17 aircraft, with bases in St. Vincent, Antigua and Grenada, offering visitors and residents a wider choice of international gateways in and out of St. Vincent & the Grenadines.

== Overview ==
The airport is built to support small aircraft. Currently, the airport can accept only propeller aircraft (maximum of 18 seats). Jet aircraft are not permitted to land in Mustique. Private jets fly into nearby Canouan, the jetport of the Grenadines, where a private charter to Mustique can be arranged.

For pilots not familiar with STOL, displaced thresholds, steep gradients at each end and a hill at one end of the runway, Mustique Airport can be a difficult airport to operate from.

Pilots unfamiliar with the airport will require a flight check before being allowed to use the aerodrome. Flight checks are provided by an approved training captain from one of the following local companies: Mustique Airways or SVG Air.

The Mustique Company owns airline Air Adelphi (Mustique shuttle), whose Twin Otter aircraft transfer customers to the airfield.

== Expansion ==
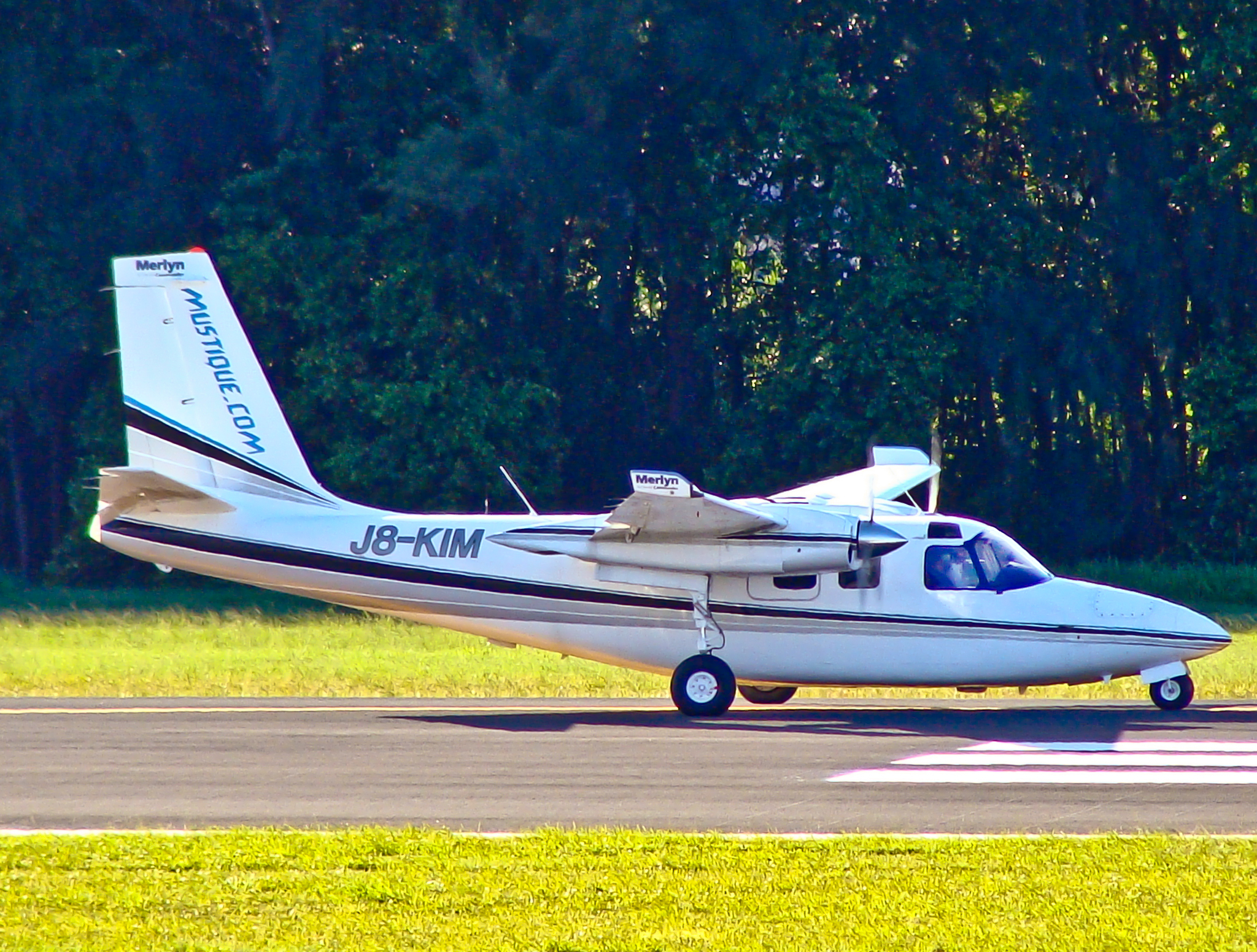
Mustique Airways Rockwell 500S Shrike Commander J8-KIM

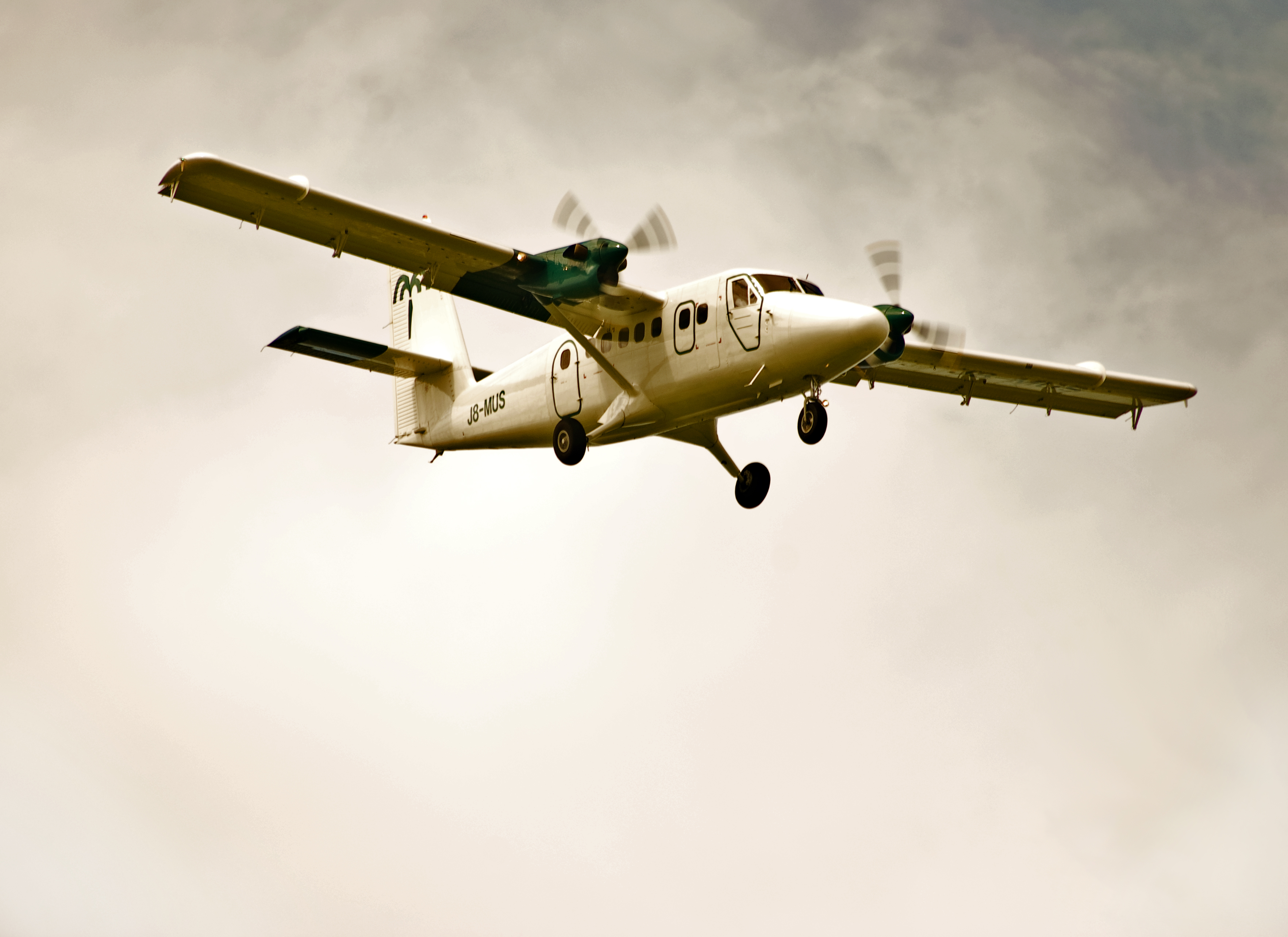
Air Adelphi MSN 726 - DHC-6-300 C-GAL (Twin Otter)

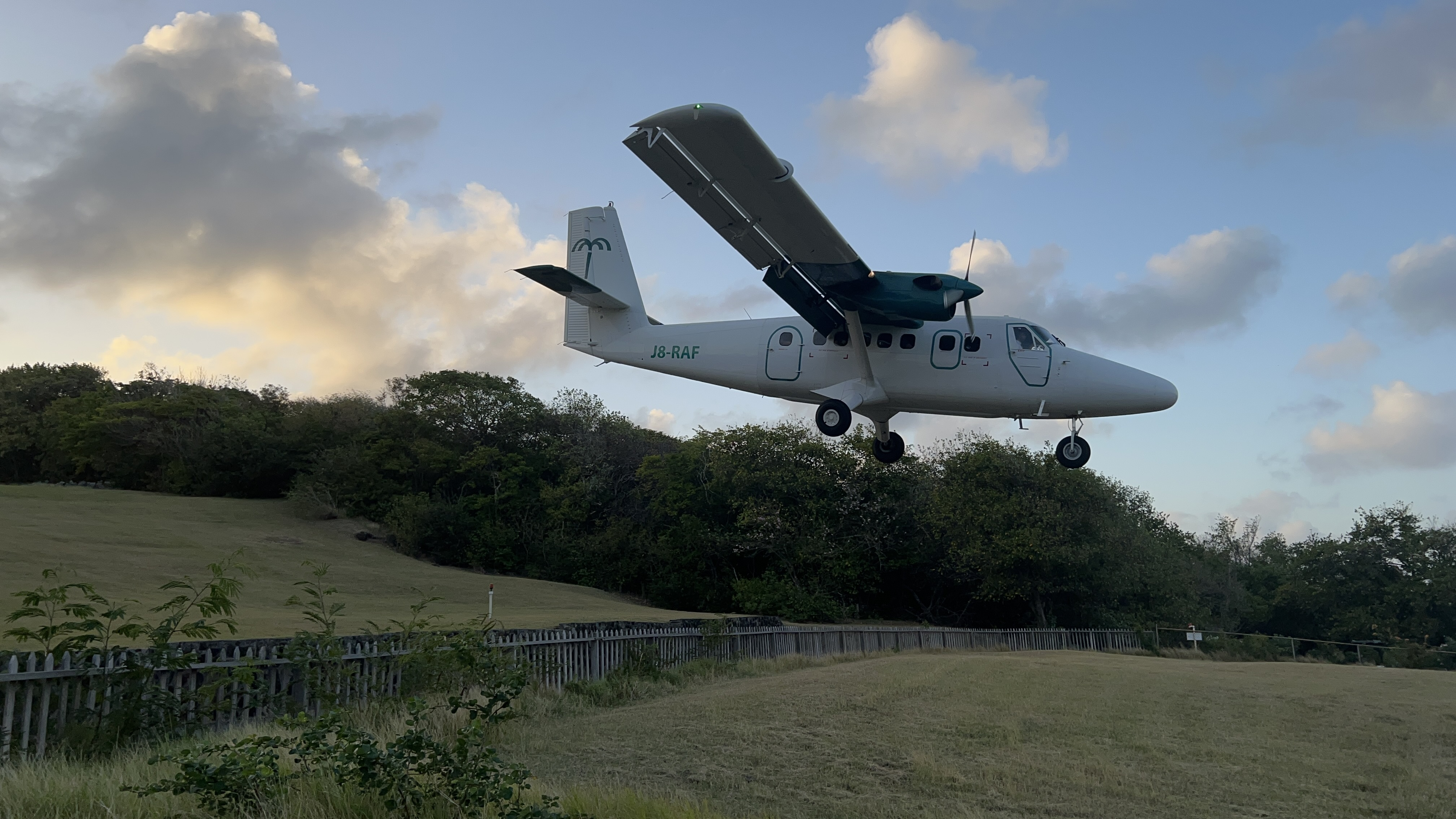
Air Adelphi Twin Otter landing

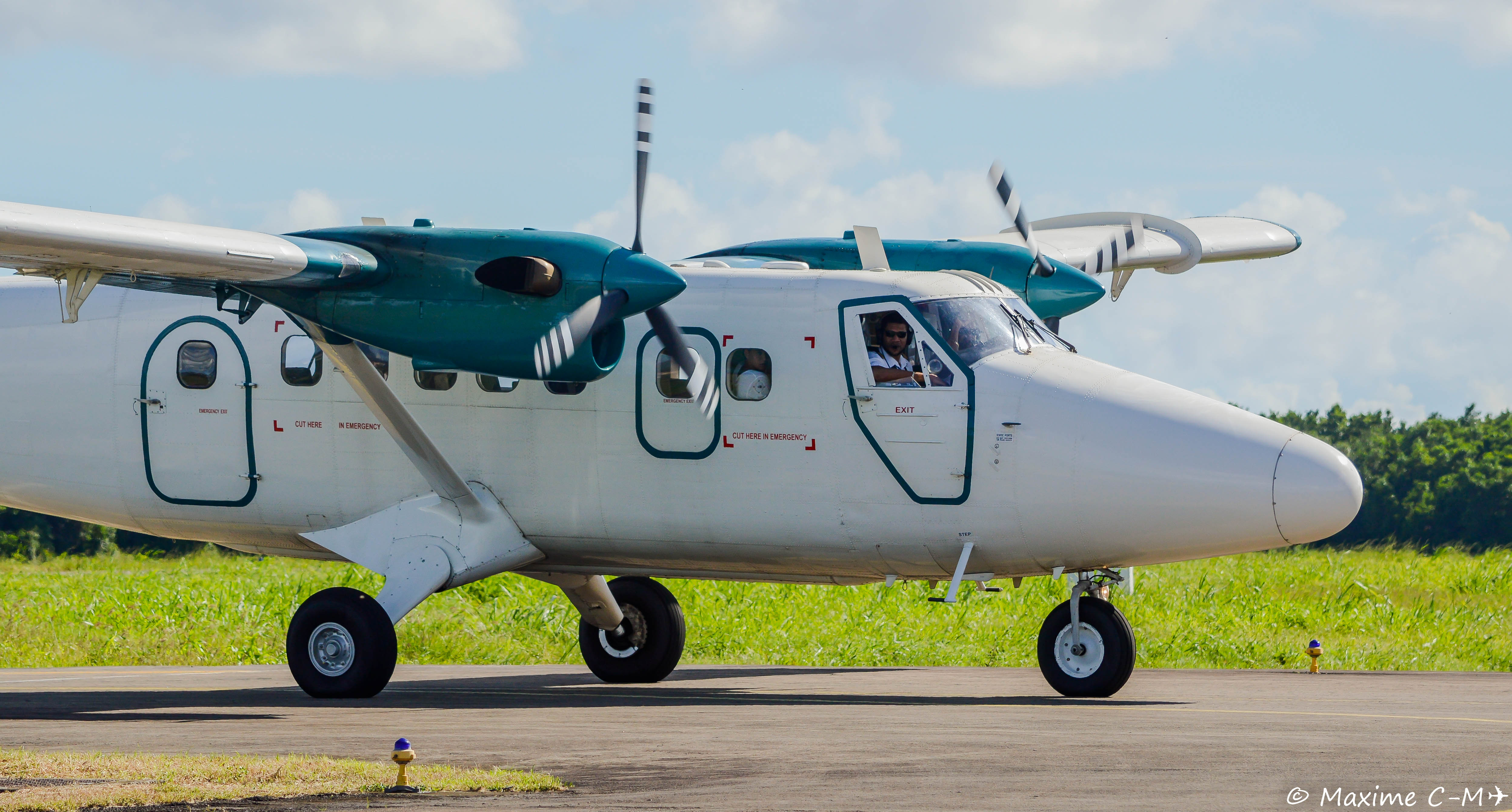
Grenadine Airways Twin Otter DHC-6-300

It was proposed to realign the existing runway at the northern end of Mustique Island to minimize the effects of elevated terrain features near the flight path. The excavation of soil and rock from high ground in the central quarry area and engineered fill placement at the low lying east and west ends of the runway are required to provide an appropriate runway gradient. The existing topography along the centerline of the proposed runway changes from approximate Elev. 1m ASL adjacent to the sanctuary to Elev. 24m ASL in the quarry area. The topography descends to Elev. 2m ASL adjacent to the Rutland Bay seasonal pond in the northeast.

The geotechnical reporting includes the subsurface investigation findings and recommendations for (a) sub excavation and/or soil improvement of the weak swampy materials comprising wet, soft clayey silt and organics in the west; (b) excavation of overburden soils and soft rock (volcanic tuff) and blasting and excavation of hard rock (grey andesite) in the middle high ground and quarry; and (c) additional subgrade preparation and engineered fill placement in the east section near the seasonal pond at Rutland Bay. Based on the aircraft loading conditions a design for the new asphalt pavement thicknesses, asphalt overlays for the existing apron and runway, and subsurface drainage requirements were provided.

== Facilities ==
The airport resides at an elevation of 8 ft (2.4 m) above mean sea level. It has one runway designated 09/27 with an asphalt surface measuring 992 m × 23 m (3,255 ft × 75 ft). A small single-story terminal building on the southeast processes passengers and baggage and also serves as the customs and immigration area with an attached two-story control tower. The terminal has a CIP (Commercially Important People) lounge. A small paved apron allows aircraft passengers to embark and to disembark.

Threshold of Runway 09 displaced 940 ft (287 m) and is marked "STOL."

The airport has no radio-navigational aids, therefore landings on Runway 09 are strictly visual. There are no operations during twilight period; Mustique's airport does not have runway lights so it closes before sunset and there are no exceptions.

=== Fire and rescue ===
Mustique Airport falls under category three of the Aerodrome Category (ICAO Index).

It has a Rapid Attack Vehicle with 60 gals, Compressed Air Foam System (CAFS), Terminator Compressed Air Foam and Dry Chemical System, Structural Fire Engine with 300 gals water and Compressed Air Foam System.

== Airlines and destinations ==
| Airlines | Destinations | Refs |
|---|---|---|
| Grenadine Airways | Saint Vincent–Argyle | |
| Mustique Airways | Bequia, Canouan, Saint Vincent–Argyle, Union Island | |
| SVG Air | Bequia, Saint Vincent–Argyle | |

== See also ==
- Grenadine Islands
- STOLport
- List of airports in Saint Vincent and the Grenadines
- List of airports in the Caribbean
- Transport in Saint Vincent and the Grenadines
- List of airlines of Saint Vincent and the Grenadines
