= J. F. Mitchell Airport =

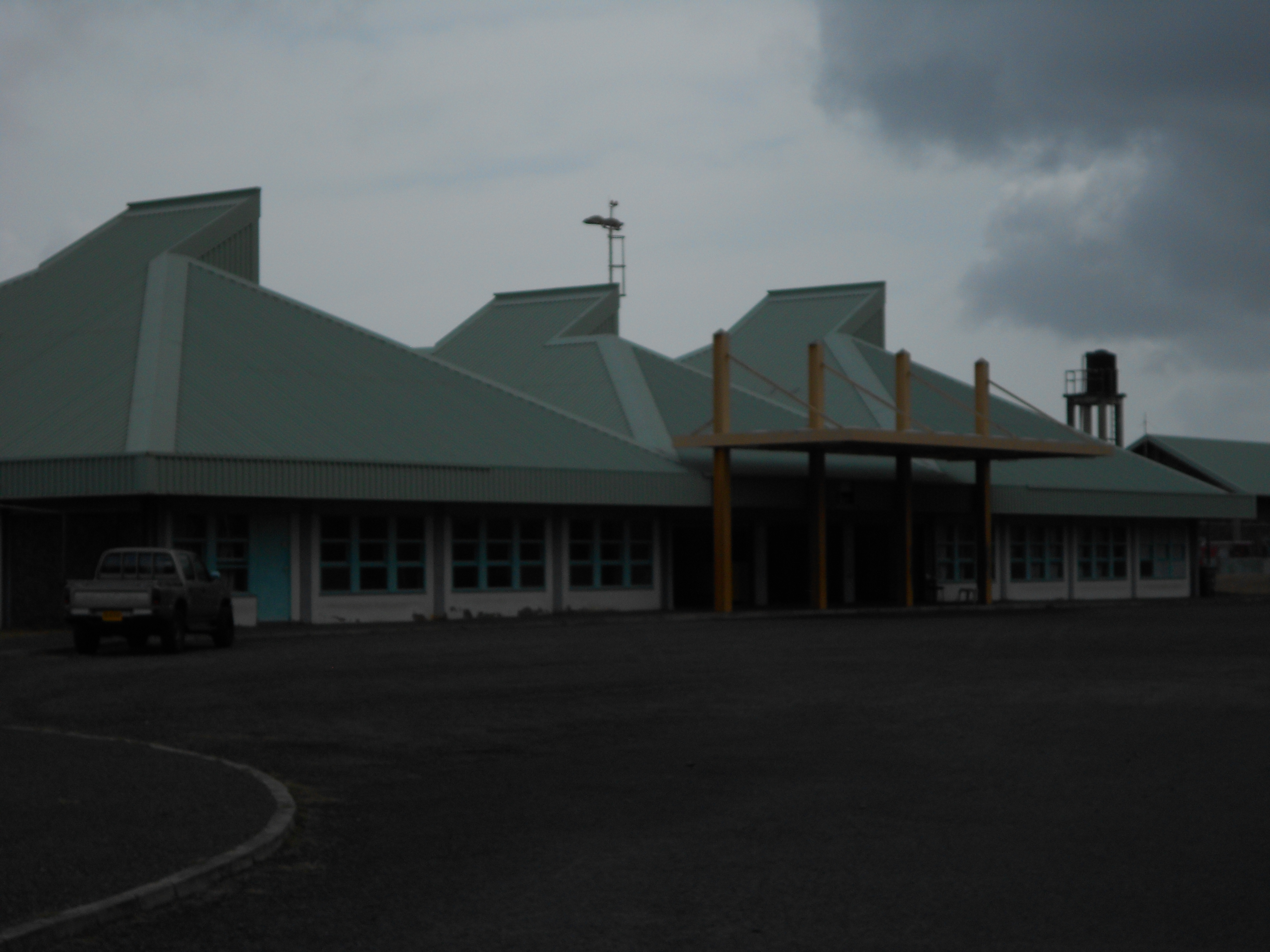
- IATA: BQU; ICAO: TVSB

Summary
- Airport type: Public
- Owner: Government of Saint Vincent and the Grenadines
- Serves: Bequia
- Location: Paget Farm
- Opened: May 15, 1992
- Hub for: SVG Air
- Time zone: AST (UTC−04:00)
- Elevation AMSL: 15 ft (4.6 m)
- Coordinates: 12°59′18″N 061°15′43″W

Map
- Location in Saint Vincent and the Grenadines

Runways
Direction	Length		Surface
Direction	m	ft	Surface
12/30	1,100	3,609	Asphalt
- Source: DAFIF

J. F. Mitchell Airport (IATA: BQU, ICAO: TVSB), also known as Bequia Airport, is the airport serving Bequia island, Grenadines Parish, Saint Vincent and the Grenadines, including Grenadines Parish's capital Port Elizabeth. It is named after Sir James Fitz-Allen Mitchell, KCMG, PC, MP, former Premier (1972-1974) and Prime Minister (1984-2000) of St. Vincent and the Grenadines. In 1990, a land reclamation project was undertaken in Paget Farm for the construction of the island's J.F. Mitchell Airport.

The airport is basically a turbo-prop center for chartered flights. Nevertheless, small private jet aircraft also fly to this airport. Most commercial flights into J. F. Mitchell Airport are domestic, but there are about ten international flights each week from Barbados and Saint Lucia; while these international flights are done by national airlines, the international routes have nevertheless awakened the interest of some foreign airlines that might open flights into this airport in the future. Like most Caribbean airports, there are no jet bridges, with all passengers exiting and entering the plane via airstairs.

J. F. Mitchell Airport is the third largest airport by land area in St. Vincent and the Grenadines, after Argyle International Airport and Canouan Airport. It is one of five airports in the multi-island nation of St. Vincent and the Grenadines, the others being Argyle International Airport in St. Vincent, Canouan Airport, Mustique Airport and Union Island Airport.

SVG Air is a national airline of St. Vincent and the Grenadines, along with Mustique Airways. SVG Air and Mustique Airways have combined to form the Grenadine Alliance, operating 17 aircraft, with bases in St. Vincent, Antigua and Grenada, offering visitors and residents a wider choice of international gateways in and out of the country.

== Overview ==
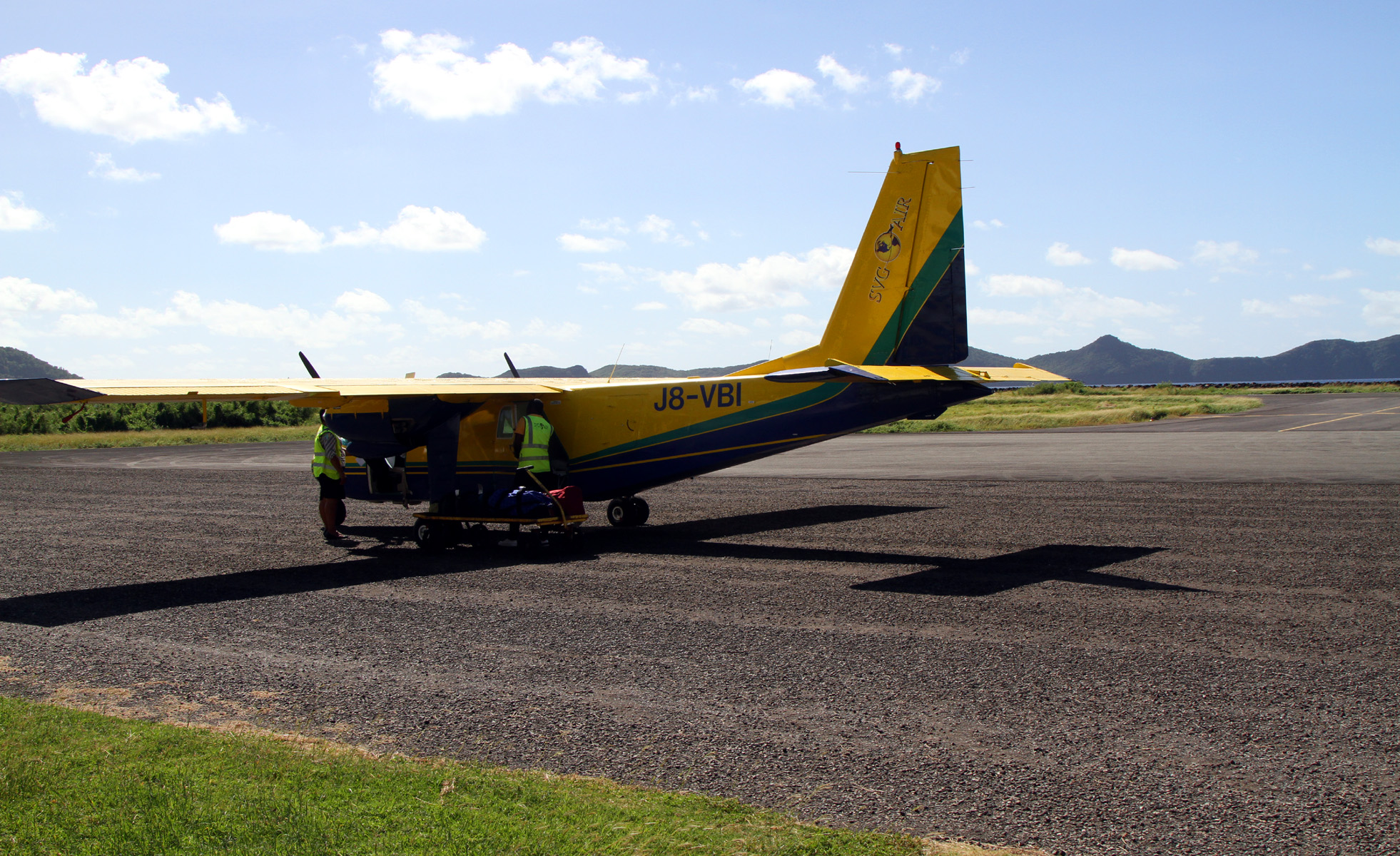
Arriving in Bequia with SVG Air

For many years, Bequia could only be reached by sea. The absence of an airstrip on Bequia constituted a major constraint to tourism development. Earlier studies suggested, to solve the lack of air transport, a feasibility study (1986) recommended construction of an airstrip with a runway length of 850 m capable of extension to 1,190 m and the location identified was on land to be reclaimed.

The opening of the J. F. Mitchell Airport in 1992 has made the island far more accessible, with regular scheduled and charter flights from Barbados, St. Lucia and St. Vincent. Bequia is popular among cruising yachts, expats and tourists.

== History ==
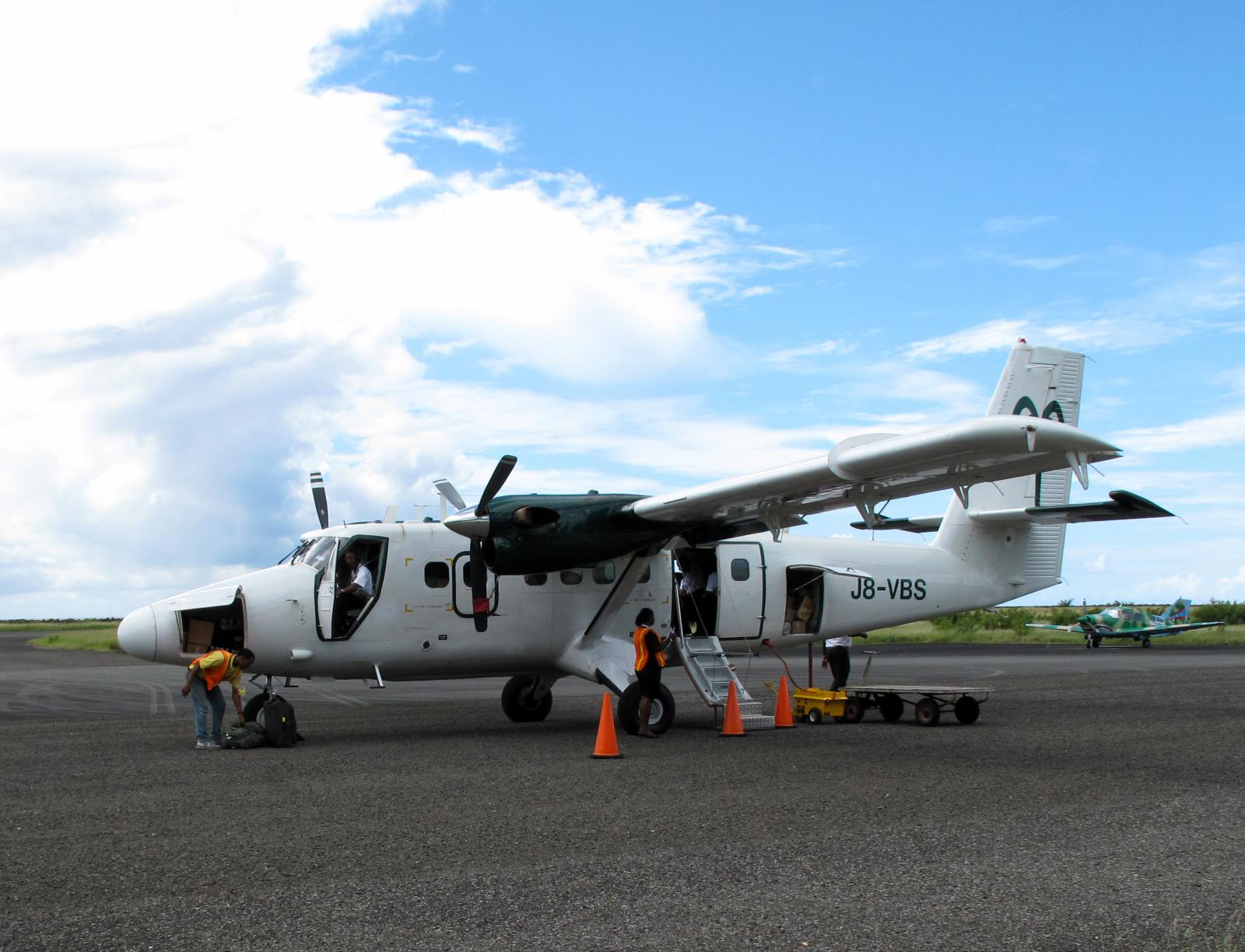
Mustique Airways Twin Otter at Bequia

In 1974, Sir William Halcrow and Partners in association with the UK Transport Development Unit produced a design for a 4,000-foot runway at Paget Farm. Studies were undertaken for this report by, among others, the Caribbean Meteorological Institute and Airline Pilots, with British technical assistance.

The World Bank Report on Tourism, dated April 20, 1982, stated that “The Grenadines are the area of most tourism potential”, stressing that priority be given to the development of “certain basic facilities, notably jetties and airstrips”. In October 1985, the European Investment Bank approved financing for the Bequia Airport Feasibility Study.

In May 1987 the final Feasibility Study by Wallace Evans and Partners was presented to the European Commission. This regional project was approved by 14 Caribbean and 12 European governments to be grant-funded under the Third LOME Convention.

The German firm of Kocks Consult GmbH was selected in June 1988 as Design and Supervision Consultants, with Interbeton/Ham of The Netherlands selected as Contractors in December 1989.

The Bequia airport went through over 41 stages of analysis, performance and certification procedures. These included the historic wave studies to determine the height of construction needed above sea level, and the critical Environmental Impact Assessment Study, which was submitted on Aug. 16, 1989.

The deep vibro compaction of the dredged sand was completed in November 1991, less than two years after the contract was awarded to Interbeton. Six months later, on May 15, 1992, The Bequia Airport was officially opened.

== Facilities ==
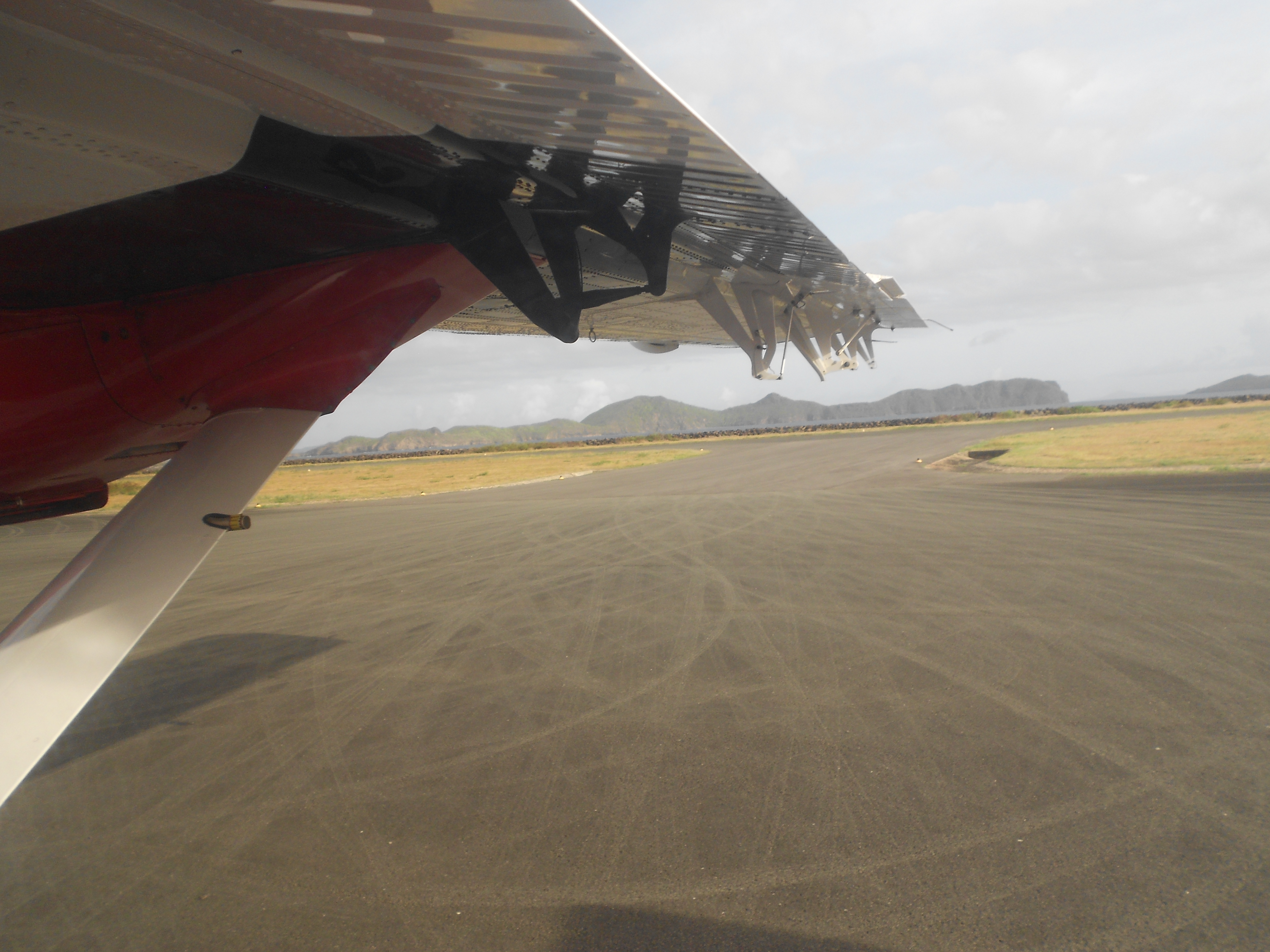
Leaving Bequia.

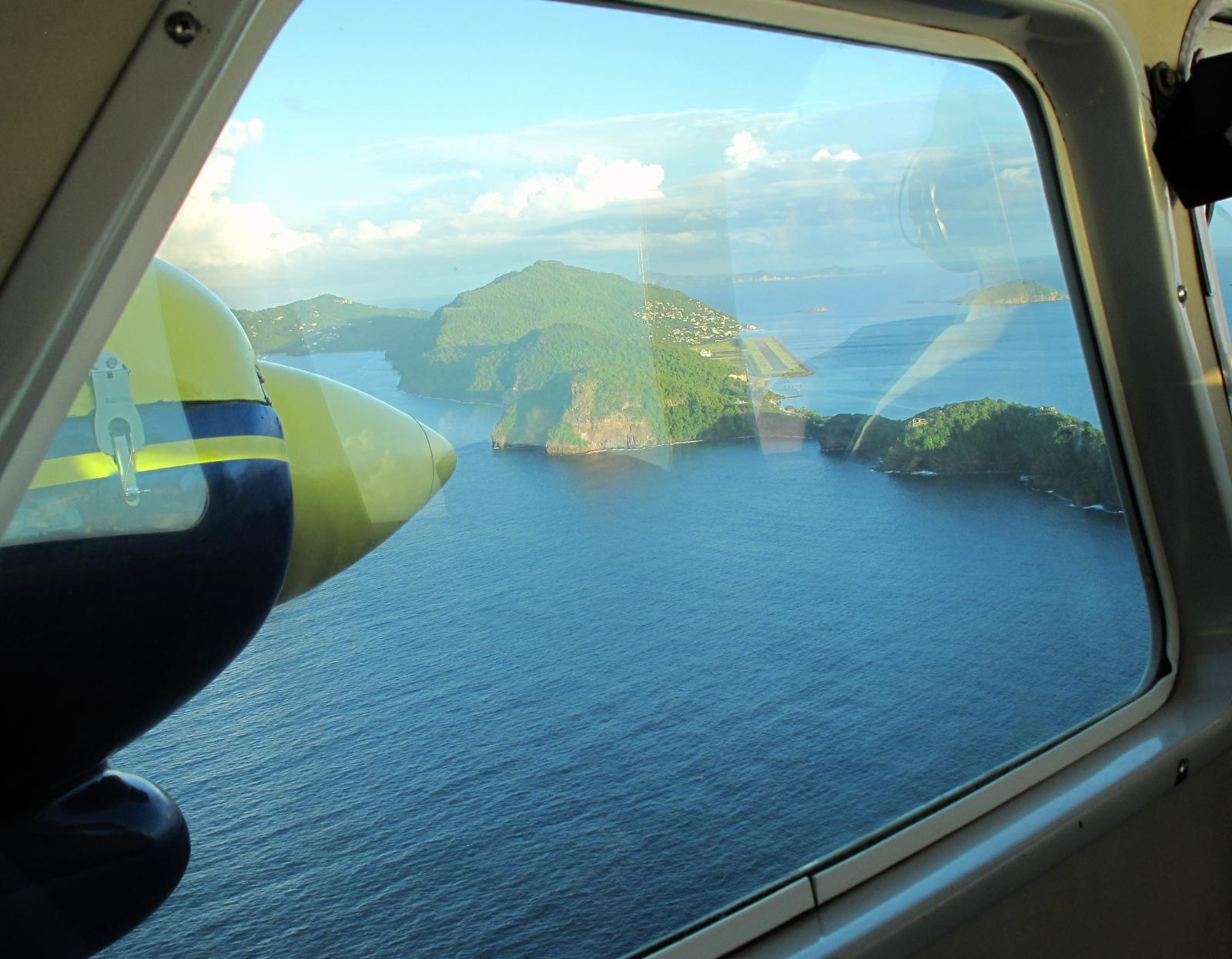
Heading for Bequia with SVG Air, aircraft cabin window view.

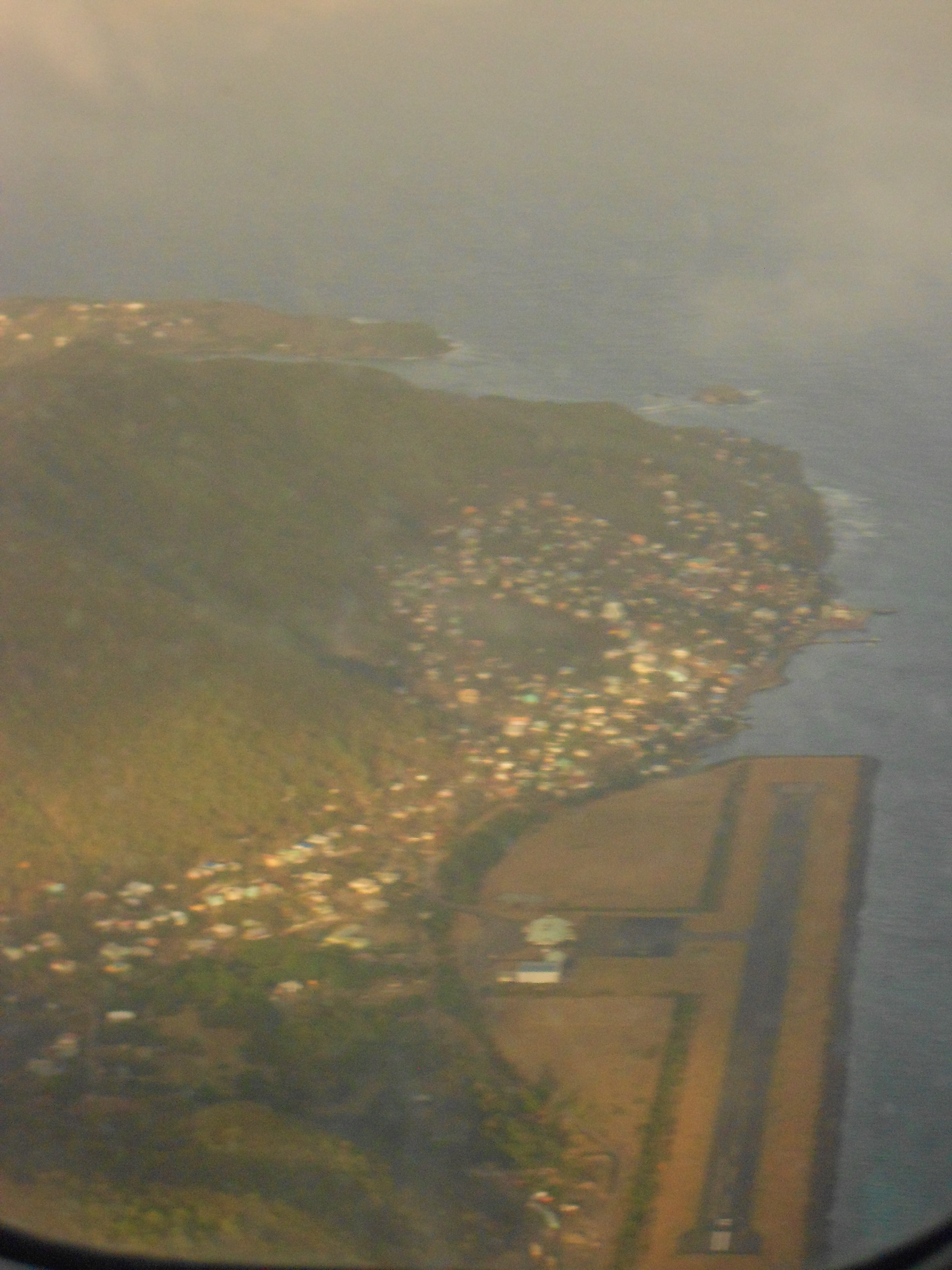
Bequia Airport from above.

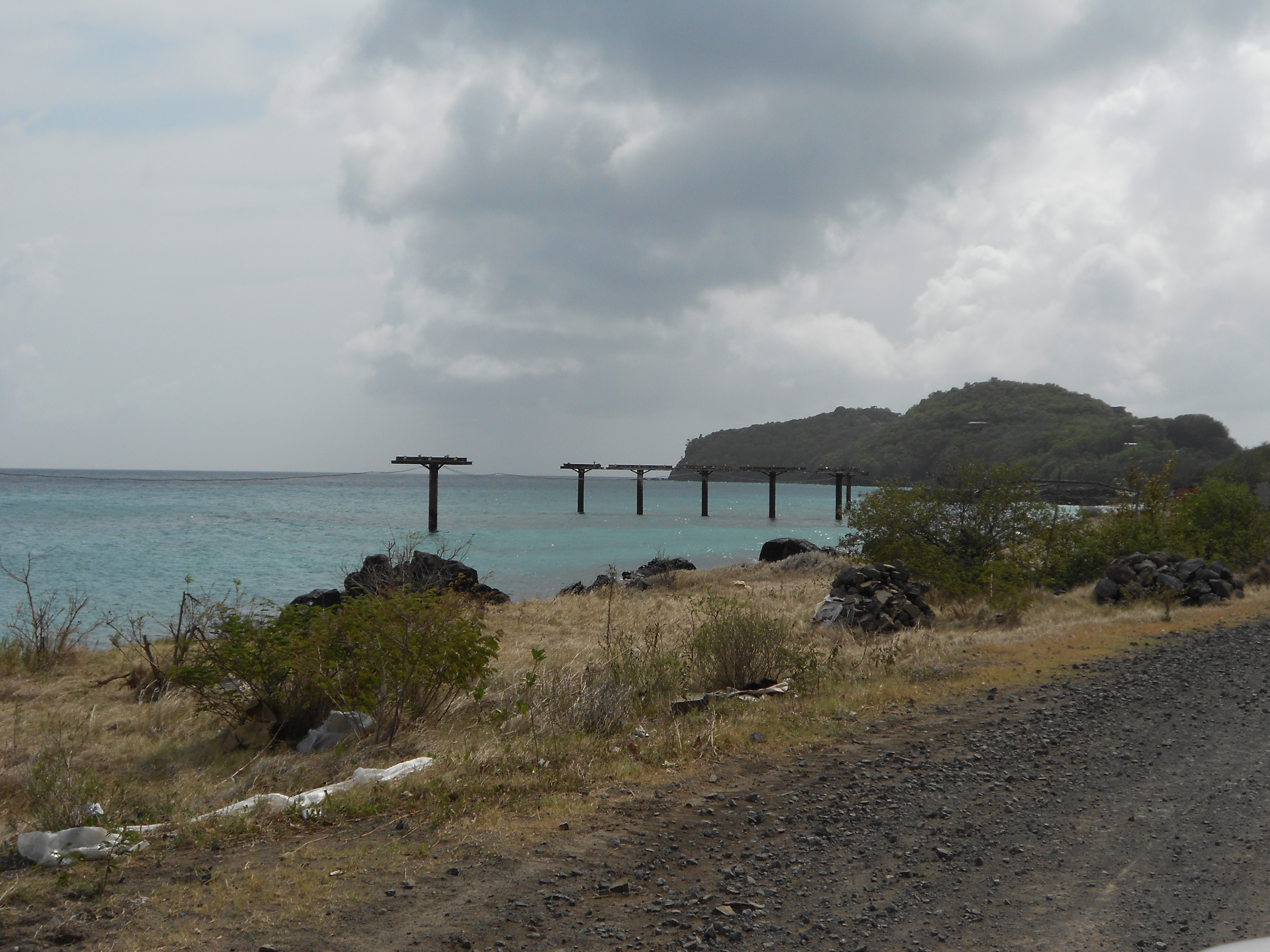
Approach Lighting System (ALS) at Runway 12 approach.

The airport resides at an elevation of 15 ft (4.6 m) above mean sea level. It has one runway designated 12/30 with an asphalt surface measuring 1,100 m × 30 m (3,609 ft × 98 ft). The 12 runway is Bequia's main approach pattern. Only Runway 12 have Precision Approach Path Indicators (PAPI) and an Approach Lighting System (ALS). The airport is capable of handling smaller business jets as well as regional turboprop airliners such as the Bombardier Dash 8 and ATR 42/72. However, the current apron can handle only two ATR-sized aircraft or five light aircraft at one given time. Bequia Airport has self-maneuvering stands, formal stands are not required due to the lack of space to accommodate nose-in-configured aircraft parking stands.

The passenger terminal is a single-story building consisting of check-in desks, departure lounge and baggage handling areas as well as customs and immigration facilities. The control tower is integrated into the terminal building.

J. F. Mitchell Airport falls under category three (3) of the Aerodrome Category (ICAO Index).

== Airlines and destinations ==
Airlines	Destinations	Refs
Grenadine Airways	Saint Vincent–Argyle, Union Island	
Mustique Airways	Canouan, Mustique, Saint Vincent–Argyle, Union Island	
SVG Air	Barbados, St. Lucia–Hewanorra, Saint Vincent–Argyle; Charter: Canouan, Mustique, Union Island	

== Other facilities ==
- SVG Air aircraft maintenance hangars are on the airport property.

== Incidents and accidents ==
- 19 November 2006 – a SVG Air Aero Commander 500S, on a flight from Canouan to Saint Vincent, was over the western end of Bequia on its final approach to Saint Vincent when it vanished. There was no distress call. Wreckage was found in the sea. The pilot and single passenger were presumed dead.
- 4 January 2024 – a private Bellanca 17-30A Super Viking crashed shortly after take-off from the airport. All four occupants of the plane died. The dead included the plane's pilot as well as actor Christian Oliver and his two young daughters.

== Environment ==
Paget Farm has dealt with an unhealthy, polluted environment for decades now. A direct, root cause of this is the poor design and improper construction of the land reclamation on which the airport was built in the 1990s. This has had devastating impacts, including marine litter being trapped in the heart of the community and an inadequate drainage system that leads to the formation of stagnant storm and runoff waters.

Lack of environmental and engineering oversight during the construction of the land reclamation and airport caused the reclaimed land to disrupt natural marine currents flowing pass the island. There is an opening between the island and the reclaimed land. This inlet acts as a funnel for all debris caught in those waters. Since then, Paget Farm has been the convergence point for marine debris and pollution from surrounding Caribbean islands and other communities in Bequia. Vast amounts of marine debris now accumulate in a small swamp located between the main street of the community of Paget Farm and the sports field built on the reclaimed land. More recently, the sargassum seaweed that has plagued the Caribbean is accumulating in the inlet.

The issue is further complicated by the creation of a problematic drainage system that was intended to direct the runoff water from the hillside into the sea via a ditch into the above inlet. This ditch is flat and at sea level, meaning that the waters do not flow into the sea but instead pool on a playing field during rainy periods.

The poor design and sedimentation of the ditch further exacerbates flooding risk and causes persistent standing water during the wet season, providing prime habitat for mosquitoes which carry diseases such as Chikungunya, which causes severe joint pain, fever, rashes and nausea, swept the Caribbean region in 2014. The first cases to immerge in St. Vincent and the Grenadines were in Paget Farm and many postulate that it is due to these very waters.

While the main causes of the unhealthy state of Paget Farm's environment is due to engineering/structural issues, it has been acknowledged and emphasized by many in the community that littering is a local contributing factor. The dumping of plastic bottles and Styrofoam containers directly into the area is not uncommon, as is the burning of waste. During community events, local vendors are not always provided with adequate ways of disposing this waste.

== See also ==
- Grenadines
- List of airlines of Saint Vincent and the Grenadines
- List of airports in Saint Vincent and the Grenadines
- List of airports in the Caribbean
- Transport in Saint Vincent and the Grenadines
