= Union Island Airport =

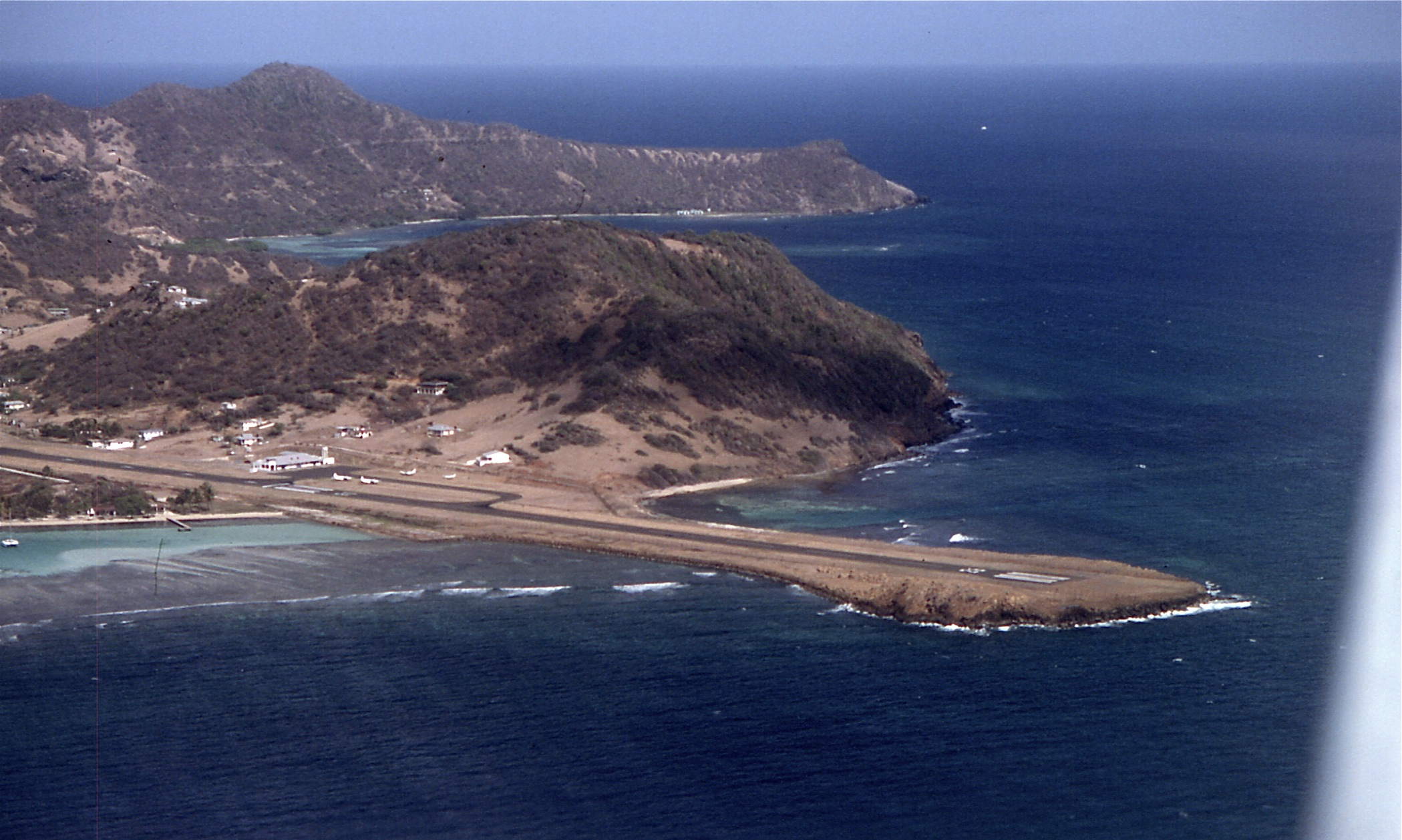
- IATA: UNI; ICAO: TVSU

Summary
- Airport type: Public
- Owner: Government of Saint Vincent and the Grenadines
- Serves: Union Island
- Location: Clifton
- Opened: 1994; 32 years ago
- Focus city for: SVG Air.
- Time zone: AST (UTC−04:00)
- Elevation AMSL: 14 ft (4.3 m)
- Coordinates: 12°35′55″N 061°24′53″W

Map
- Location in Saint Vincent and the Grenadines

Runways
Direction	Length		Surface
Direction	m	ft	Surface
08/26	752	2,467	Asphalt
- Sources: Great Circle Mapper and Google Earth

Union Island Airport (IATA: UNI, ICAO: TVSU) is the airport serving Union Island, Grenadines Parish, Saint Vincent and the Grenadines. It is located about 0.25 miles (0.40 km) from the town of Clifton, one of the country's main tourist centers and a major destination for charter leisure flights during the winter holiday season and Easter, for "Easterval" celebration. The airport serves as a focus city for flag carrier SVG Air and features flights to several short-haul regional destinations. It is the southmost airport of St. Vincent and the Grenadines.

The airport, which currently handles only turboprop aircraft services mainly light regional aircraft with domestic flights to and from St. Vincent and some of the Grenadines and regular scheduled and shared charter international flights to Barbados, Carriacou, Grenada, St. Lucia and Martinique.

Union Island Airport, which was constructed in 1994, operates as a major gateway to the southern Grenadines with connections from Clifton Harbour via water taxis or charter yachts to Mayreau and the National Marine Park of the Tobago Cays, the focal point for "Marine Tourism" in the area and private boat transfers to the exclusive luxury island retreats on Palm Island and Petit St. Vincent (PSV). The region's tourism industries have helped foster growth at the airport.

It is one of five airports in the multi-island nation of St. Vincent and the Grenadines, the others being Argyle International Airport in St. Vincent, J. F. Mitchell Airport in Bequia, Mustique Airport and Canouan Airport.

SVG Air, is a national airline of St. Vincent and the Grenadines, along with Mustique Airways. SVG Air and Mustique Airways have combined to form a SVG Air / Grenadine Air Alliance, operating 17 Aircraft, with bases in St. Vincent, Antigua and Grenada. Offering visitors and residents a wider choice of International Gateways in and out of St. Vincent & the Grenadines.

The airport has a small passenger terminal building which includes waiting areas as well as processing areas for check in (4 counters), security, emigration control, customs control, baggage reclaim and immigration control. A small carpark is located at the front entrance of the terminal. Boarding of aircraft is on foot across the apron.

Union Island Airport has a fairly short runway with a displaced threshold, so commercial air service is accomplished using short takeoff and landing (STOL) type aircraft. The displaced portion of the runway may be used for takeoff but not for landing.

== Overview ==
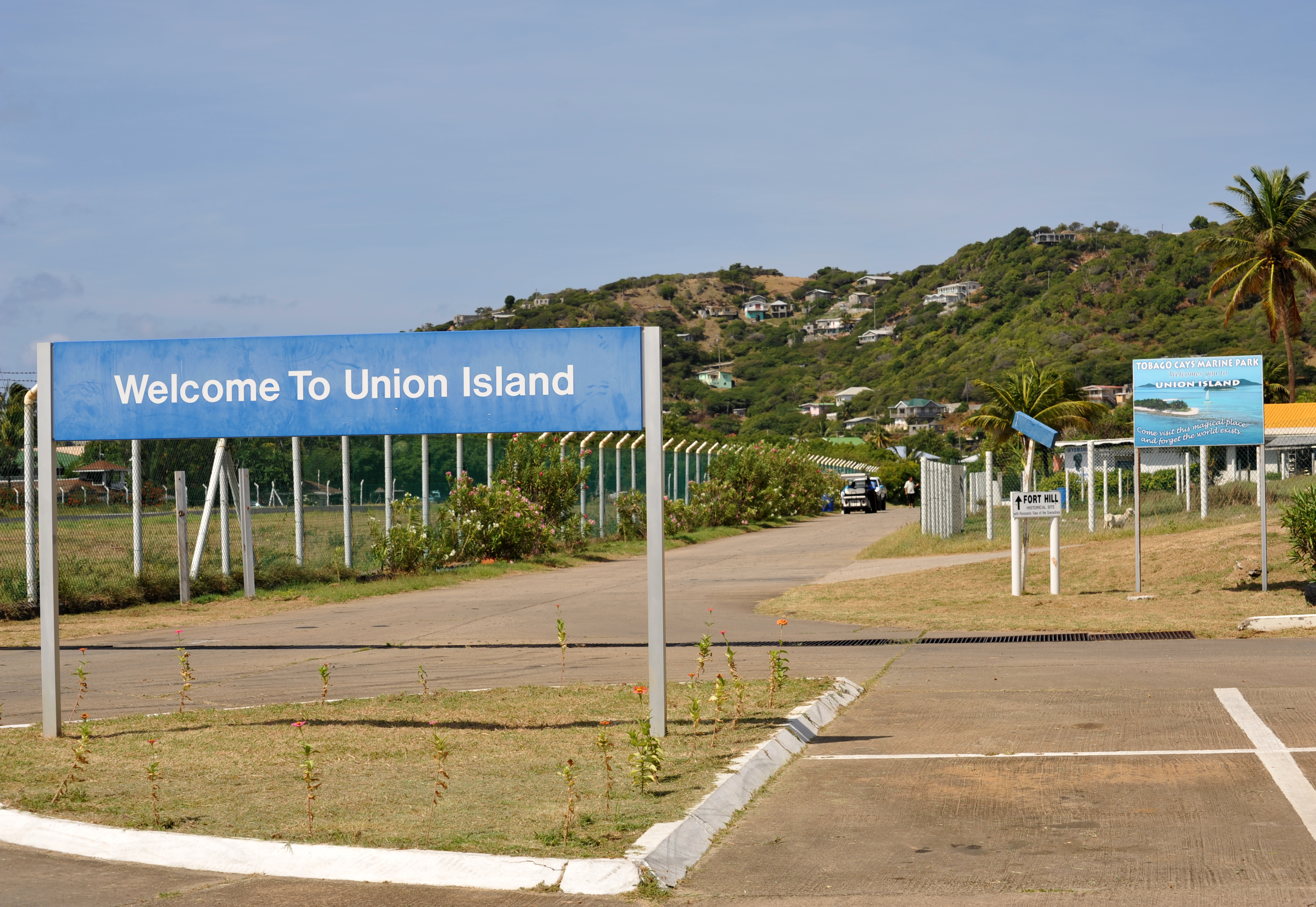
Welcome to Union Island.

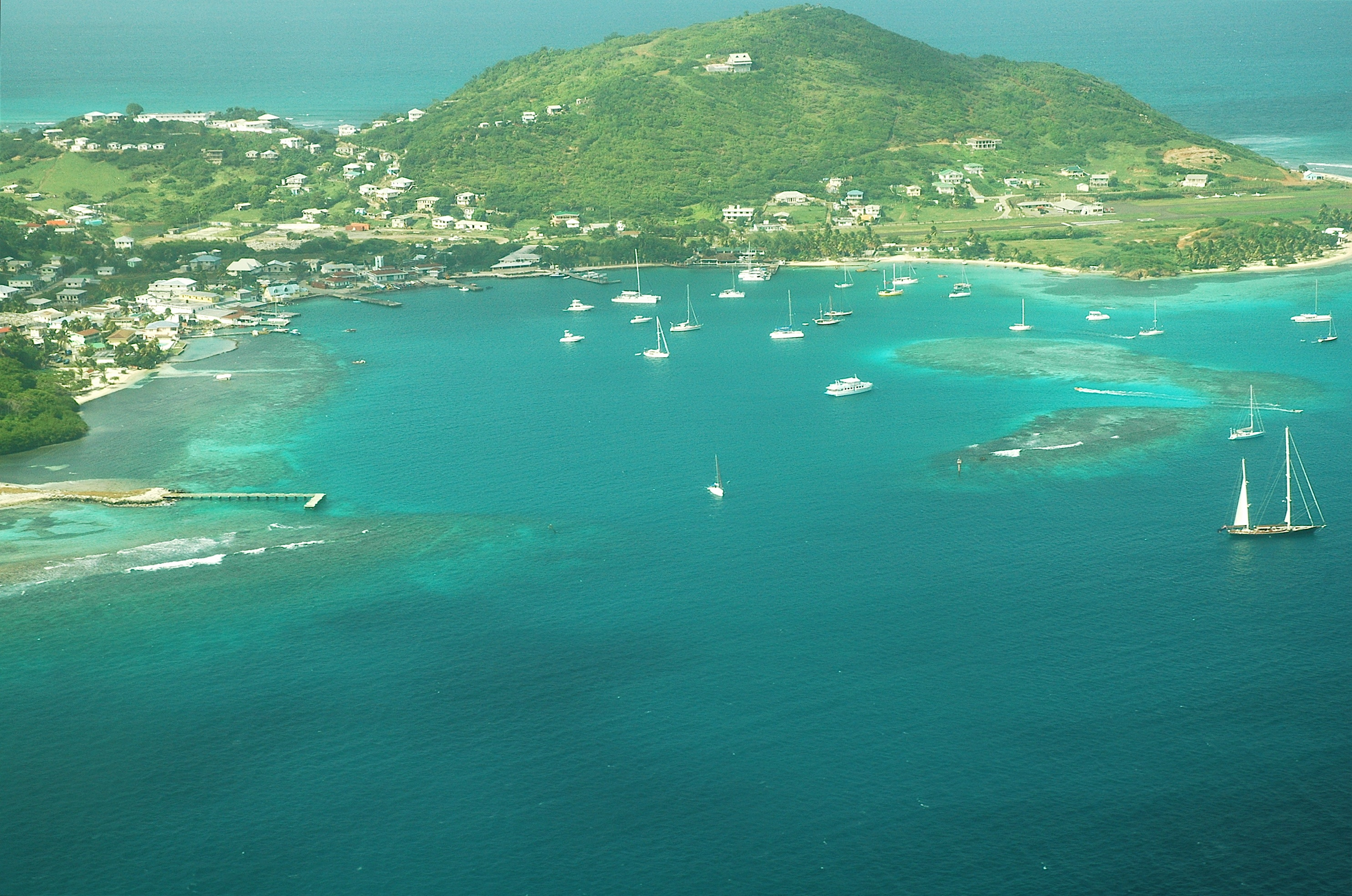
Clifton Aerial View, showing Union Island Airport on the far right.

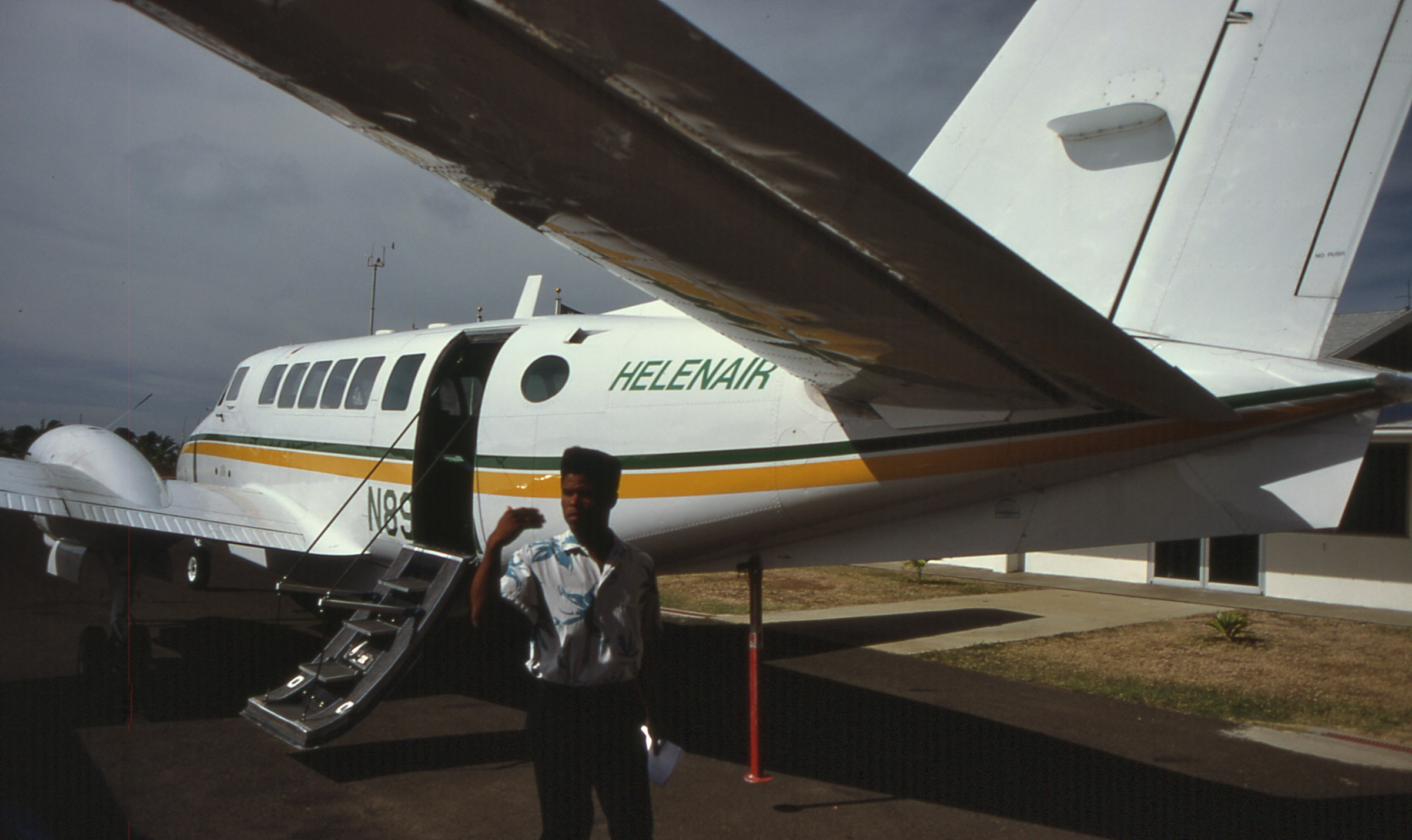
Beech 99 Helenair N899CA

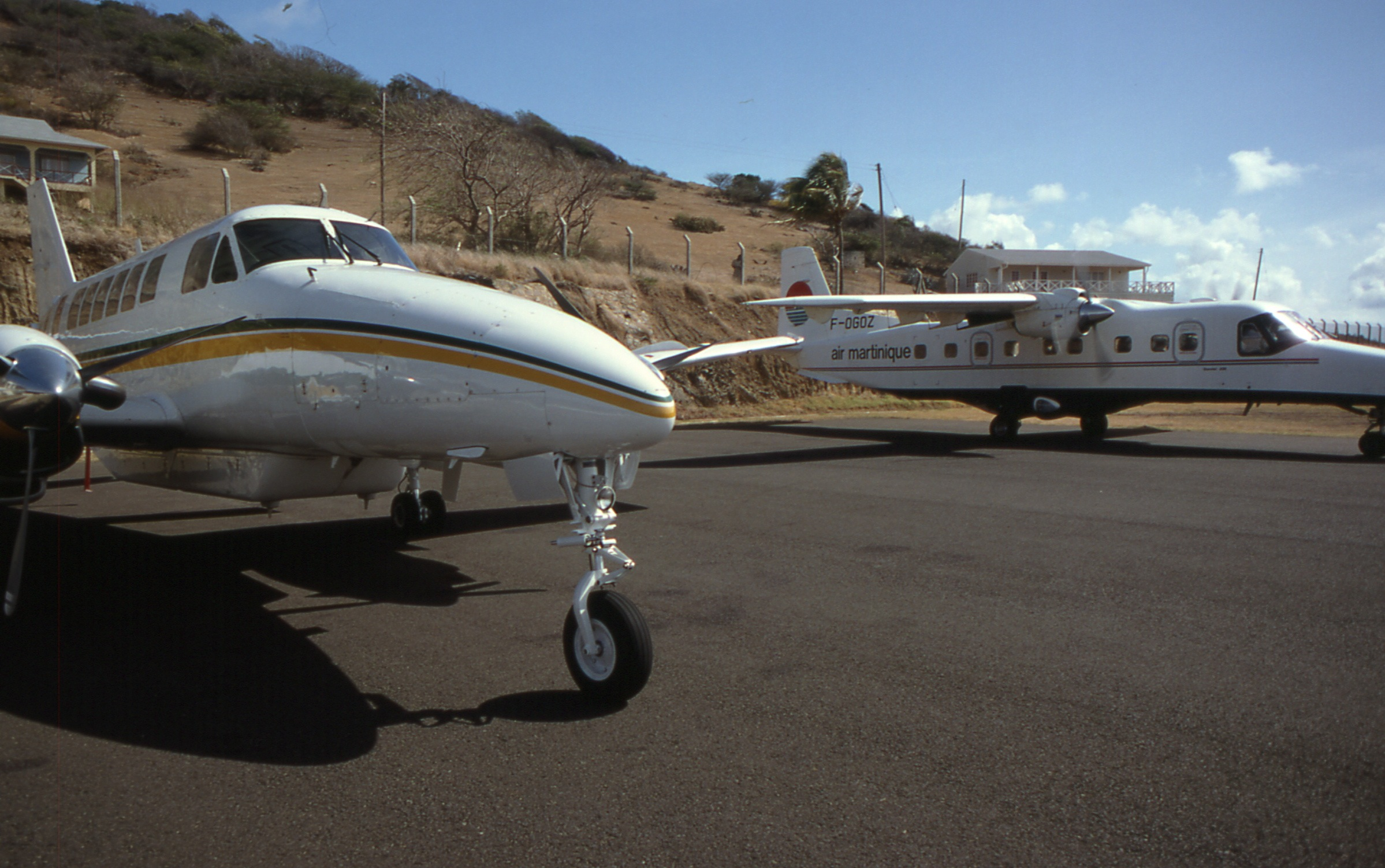
Helenair Beech 99 & Air Martinique Do228

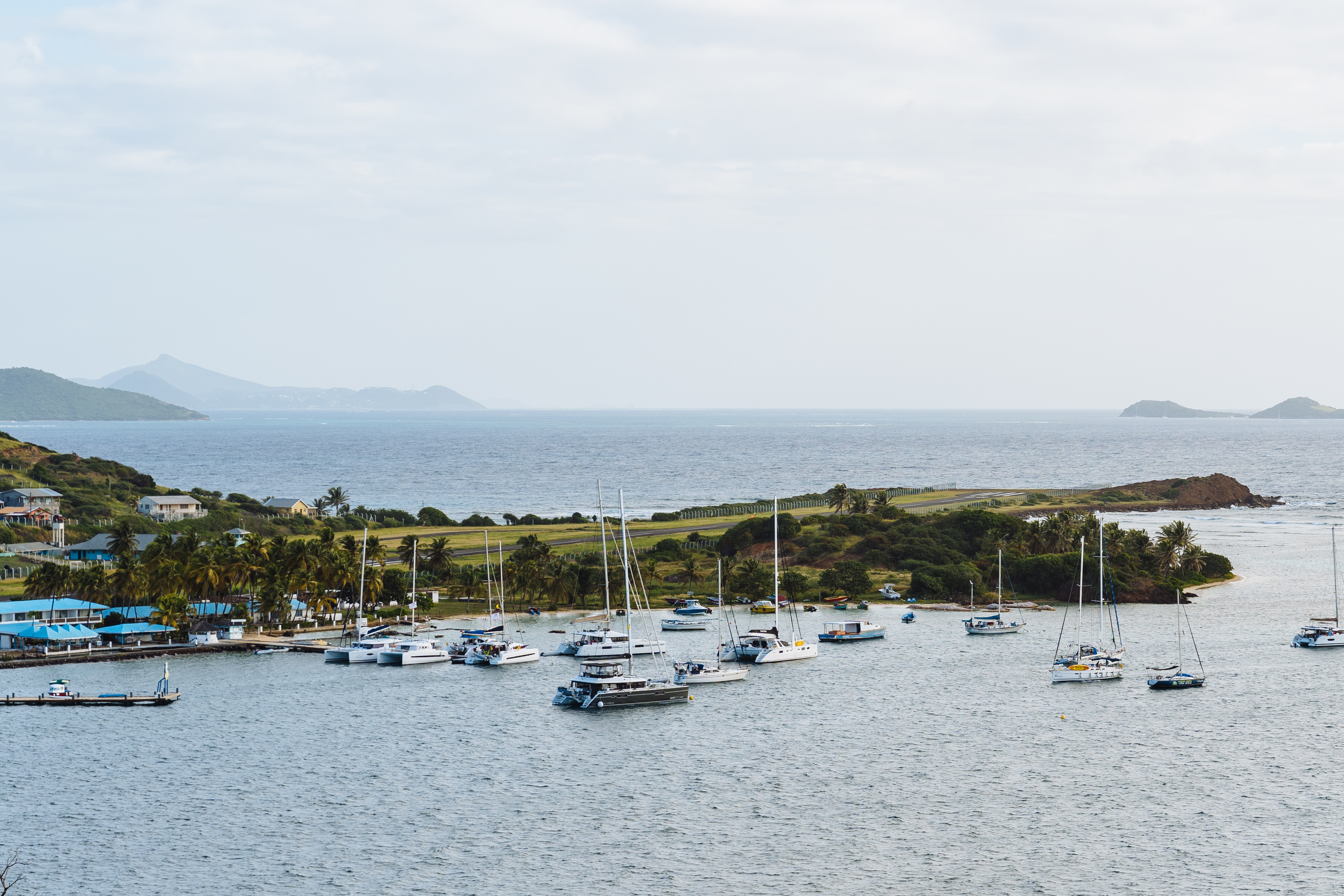
Union Island Airport as seen from a nearby hill

Union Island Airport is well known for having a difficult approach due to surrounding terrain, prohibiting certain aircraft types from operating at the airport. Landings at the airport are dramatic to experience and technically demanding for pilots. However, Union Island Airport is not quite as dramatic as Saba or St. Barts, but it does have a notable "over-the-hill-and-dive" approach and descent from the west, the usual direction in the easterly trade winds. The main approach into the airport is Runway 08, small GA planes occasionally fly a tight pattern inside the hills, but this requires a sharpish turn to final approach close to the ground and overflies the inhabited area more than the Clifton town people probably prefer. The airport's surroundings leave little room for error or mistake on the behalf of the pilots – with nearby hills and sea at the end of the short runway. The approach to this airport could be considered good practice for pilots before flying to Saint Barthélemy Airport.

Union Island's airport is open year-round for arrivals and departures from dawn to dusk. Runways at the Union Island Airport are modern and paved but not lit so there are no departures after dusk. You may expect light turbulence on approach when winds exceed 10 knots.

The runway of the existing airport was 640 m (2.100 ft) long and 12 m wide with a 100 m (330 ft) section built on land reclaimed in shallow waters. The condition of the runway pavement had seriously deteriorated. Due to obstruction by hills, the western approach slope was about 20 per cent.

Preliminary design calls for two solutions with extended new runway of 762 m (2,500 ft) and improved approach slope, taxiway, apron, aircraft parking area, pavements, terminal building, access road and seaward shore protection.

Under consideration of the Dornier DO 228-200 as reference aircraft, KOCKS CONSULT GMBH provided the following services for the improvement of Union Island Airport:

- Field Investigations, Preliminary Design and Environmental Impact Study.
- Final Design and Tender Documents.
- Supervision of Construction.

The airport was closed for two weeks for the first phase of rehabilitation work on May 4, 2009. Under the rehabilitation program, the runway, taxiway and apron areas were re-surfaced, and the markings in these areas were refreshed.

On December 5, 2009, CCA Limited commenced works on the second phase of the Union Island Airport rehabilitation project and within two weeks it was successfully completed. The project works consisted of placing armour stones (sea defense) at the east-end of the runway, as the shoreline had been damaged by a previous hurricane.

After the upgrade, the number of passengers and aircraft movements had substantially increased to 350 and 70 respectively per day during the peak season. Holiday villages and hotels provide aquatic sport facilities for windsurfers, kitesurfers, yachtsmen, scuba divers and snorkelers. Union Island is known for its watersports activities. Tourist attractions in the Grenadines such as Tobago Cays Marine Park have attracted service as well.

== Facilities ==
The airport resides at an elevation of 14 ft (4.3 m) above mean sea level. It has one runway designated 08/26 with an asphalt surface measuring 752 m × 18 m (2,467 ft × 59 ft) with a paved ramp & terminal building on the northwest. There are no covered maintenance facilities for aircraft and aviation fuel is not available at the airport. However, fuel may be purchased at nearby Canouan Airport on Canouan.

Threshold of Runway 08 displaced 826 ft (252 m). This, together with the physical dimensions of the 752 m (2,467 ft) long runway and the steep glideslope, limits the aircraft types that can use Union island Airport. It has the shortest commercial runway in St. Vincent and the Grenadines.

Although the airport is closed to jet traffic, national and regional airlines propeller aircraft are able to land there. Airlines operating jet aircraft serve the Grenadines via Argyle International Airport and Canouan Airport. There are no published instrument procedures at this airport. It operates under Visual flight rules.

Union Island Airport falls under category three (3) of the Aerodrome Category (ICAO Index).

== Airlines and destinations ==
Airlines	Destinations	Refs
Grenadine Airways	Bequia, St. Lucia–Hewanorra, St. Vincent–Argyle	
Mustique Airways	Barbados, Bequia, Canouan, Mustique, St. Vincent–Argyle	
SVG Air	Barbados, Bequia, Canouan, Carriacou, Grenada, St. Vincent–Argyle; Charter: Antigua, Mustique	

== Incidents and accidents ==
- 8 January 1996 – Britten-Norman BN-2 Islander operated by Mustique Airways departed from Union Island Airport en route to Grantley Adams International Airport in Barbados with the pilot and nine passengers. While in cruise flight at 7,000 feet, the no. 2 engine failed. The pilot was unable to maintain height and the airplane gradually descended until a ditching was unavoidable. The plane crashed 30 km (18.8 ml) SW off of Bridgetown, Barbados. One person was killed.
- 5 March 2011 – Beechcraft 200 Super King Air aircraft operated by Wyngs Aviation landed with a tailwind and overran the runway. The aircraft, en route from Porlamar Airport in Venezuela to Canouan, encountered challenges during its approach to Union Island. The pilot mistakenly landed with a tailwind, causing the aircraft to overrun the runway upon landing. The impact of the landing led to the collapse of the nose wheel and extensive damage to the propeller blades. No reports of injuries. The plane was heading to Canouan from Porlamar Airport, Venezuela, when the pilot mistook Union Island for the neighboring island.

== See also ==
- Union Island
- Grenadine Islands
- STOLport
- List of airports in Saint Vincent and the Grenadines
- List of airports in the Caribbean
- Transport in Saint Vincent and the Grenadines
- List of airlines of Saint Vincent and the Grenadines
- JT Pro Center Kitesurfing School
- Caribbean Beat, the in-flight magazine of Caribbean Airlines, Issue 149 (January/February 2018)
- ZiNG, the in-flight magazine for LIAT, the Caribbean airline, Issue 40 (November 7, 2017)
