= List of airlines of Saint Vincent and the Grenadines =

This is a list of airlines currently operating in Saint Vincent and the Grenadines.

Airline	Image	IATA	ICAO	Callsign	Hub airport(s)	Founded	Notes
Mustique Airways			MAW	MUSTIQUE	Argyle International Airport	1979	
One Caribbean		CO	VCY	VINCY	Argyle International Airport	2017	
SVG Air			SVG	GRENADINES	Argyle International Airport	1990	National airline
Air Adelphi			MUS	ADELPHI	Argyle International Airport	2022	

== See also ==
- List of airlines
- List of airports in Saint Vincent and the Grenadines
- Eastern Caribbean Civil Aviation Authority (ECCAA)
