= E. T. Joshua Airport =

E.T. Joshua Airport (decommissioned)
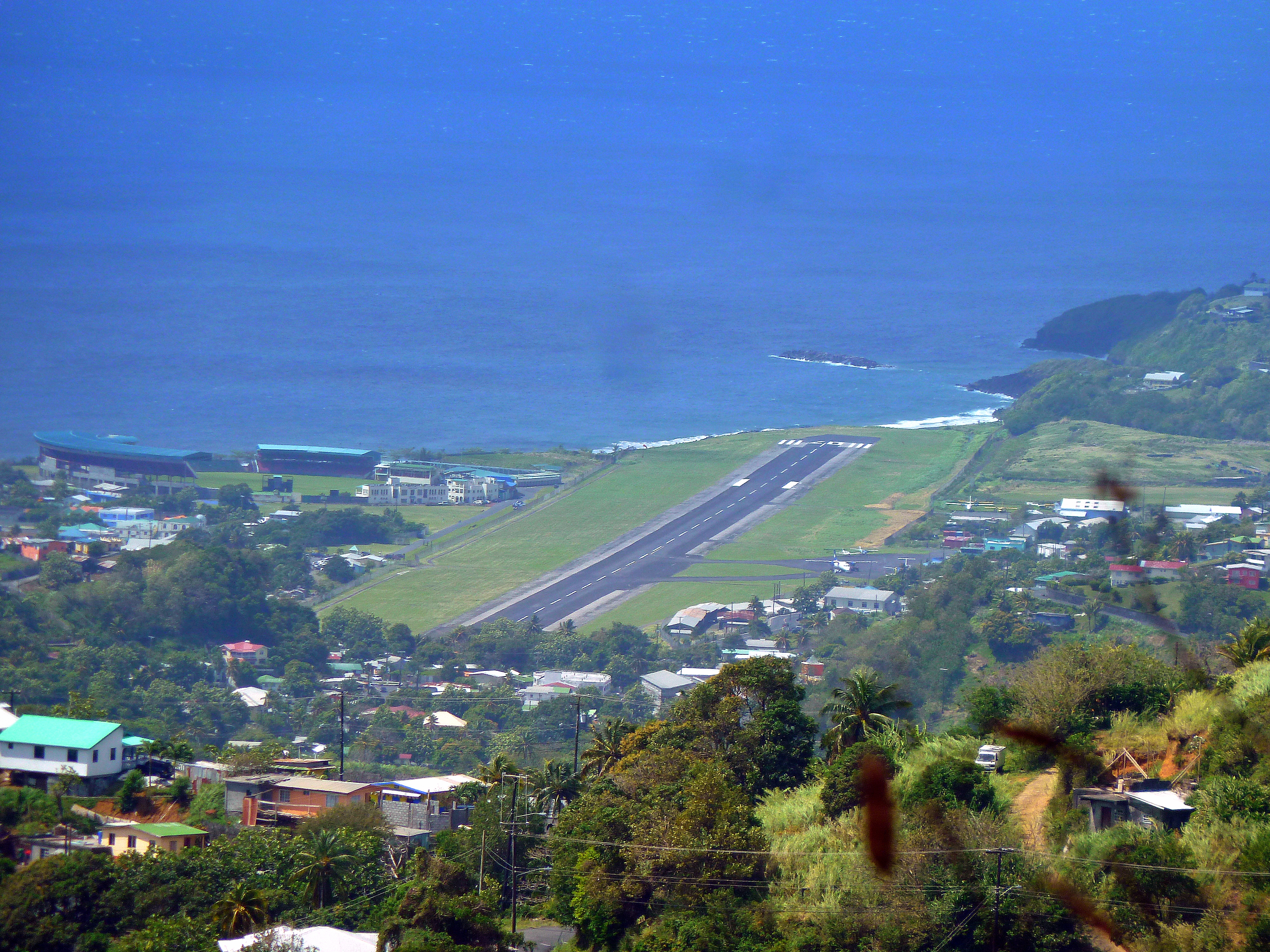
- IATA: SVD; ICAO: ~~TVSV~~

Summary
- Airport type: Defunct
- Serves: Arnos Vale
- Location: Kingstown
- Elevation AMSL: 66 ft (20 m)
- Coordinates: 13°08′40″N 061°12′39″W

Map
- Location in Saint Vincent and the Grenadines

Runways
Direction	Length		Surface
Direction	m	ft	Surface
07/25	1,401	4,596	Asphalt
- Source: DAFIF

E.T. Joshua Airport (ICAO: ~~TVSV~~), formerly known as Arnos Vale Airport, was an airport located in Arnos Vale, near Kingstown, on the island of Saint Vincent. The airport was named for Ebenezer Theodore Joshua, the first chief minister of Saint Vincent and the Grenadines. The airport was a hub for Grenadine Airways, Mustique Airways and SVG Air.

The airport formerly housed the St. Vincent Outstation of the Eastern Caribbean Civil Aviation Authority.

When Saint Vincent's Argyle International Airport opened on 14 February 2017, the E.T. Joshua airport was simultaneously decommissioned.

== History ==
The then Arnos Vale Airport succeeded the Diamond Airfield as St. Vincent's main and only airport in the 1960s.

== Airlines and destinations ==
=== Passenger Airlines ===
As of 2017, all scheduled passenger flights transferred to Argyle International Airport.

=== Cargo Airlines ===
As of 2017, all scheduled cargo flights transferred to Argyle International Airport.

== Post-closure development plans ==
The Government planned to close the airport to make room for a new city at Arnos Vale. On 14 September 2020, Finance Minister Camillo Gonsalves, in a Facebook post, provided an update on the conversion of the old ET Joshua Airport terminal building to a “modern retail and entertainment plaza”, known as “The Joshua Centre”. The shopping centre is expected to be completed in March 2021.

== Accidents and incidents ==
- LIAT Flight 319: On 4 August 1986, a LIAT de Havilland Canada DHC-6 Twin Otter crashed into the Caribbean Sea. The aircraft was en route between St. Lucia and St. Vincent when it crashed due to poor weather conditions, while on approach. After a full day's search failed to find a trace of the Twin Otter, all of the 11 passengers and two crew were presumed dead.
- 19 November 2006 – SVG Air Aero Commander 500S, on a flight from Canouan to St. Vincent, was over the western end of Bequia on its final approach to St. Vincent when it vanished. There was no distress call. Wreckage was found in the sea. The pilot and single passenger are presumed dead.
- 5 August 2010 – SVG Air Aircraft on a flight from St. Vincent to Canouan crashed off Canouan with only the pilot on board. Wreckage from the plane was pulled from the site. Coast Guard Commander Brenton Cain told a news conference that debris had also been found 7.5 nautical miles off the island of Mustique, but the pilot was never found.
