= Interbeton =

Interbeton may refer to:

- TBG Interbeton, a cement producer in Siófok, Hungary
- Interbeton/Ham, a Dutch contractor; see J. F. Mitchell Airport
