= One Caribbean =

Vincentian and Grenadinian airline

IATA	ICAO	Call sign
CO	VCY	Vincy
- Founded: 2016
- Hubs: Argyle International Airport
- Fleet size: 3
- Headquarters: Kingstown, Saint Vincent and the Grenadines
- Website: https://flyonecaribbean.com/

One Caribbean, founded in 2016, is an airline based in Saint Vincent and the Grenadines.

== Destinations ==
Country (Province/State)	City	Airport	Notes	Refs
Barbados	Bridgetown	Grantley Adams International Airport		
Saint Martin		Princess Juliana International Airport		
Saint Vincent and the Grenadines	Kingstown	Argyle International Airport	Hub	
Tortola		Terrance B. Lettsome International Airport		

== Fleet ==
As of July 2020, the One Caribbean fleet consists of the following aircraft:

Caribbean Airlines Fleet
Aircraft	In service	Orders	Passengers				Notes
Aircraft	In service	Orders	C	Y+	Y	Total	Notes
Saab 340	3		—	—	30	30	
Boeing 747-400	1	—					
Total	4	0					

== Accidents and incidents ==
- 26 August 2019: One Caribbean Saab 340 experienced a runway excursion during a takeoff attempt at Argyle International Airport.
- 22 December 2019: One Caribbean Saab 340 8P-OCL experienced a tail strike on landing
