= List of airports in Saint Vincent and the Grenadines =

A map of Saint Vincent and the Grenadines

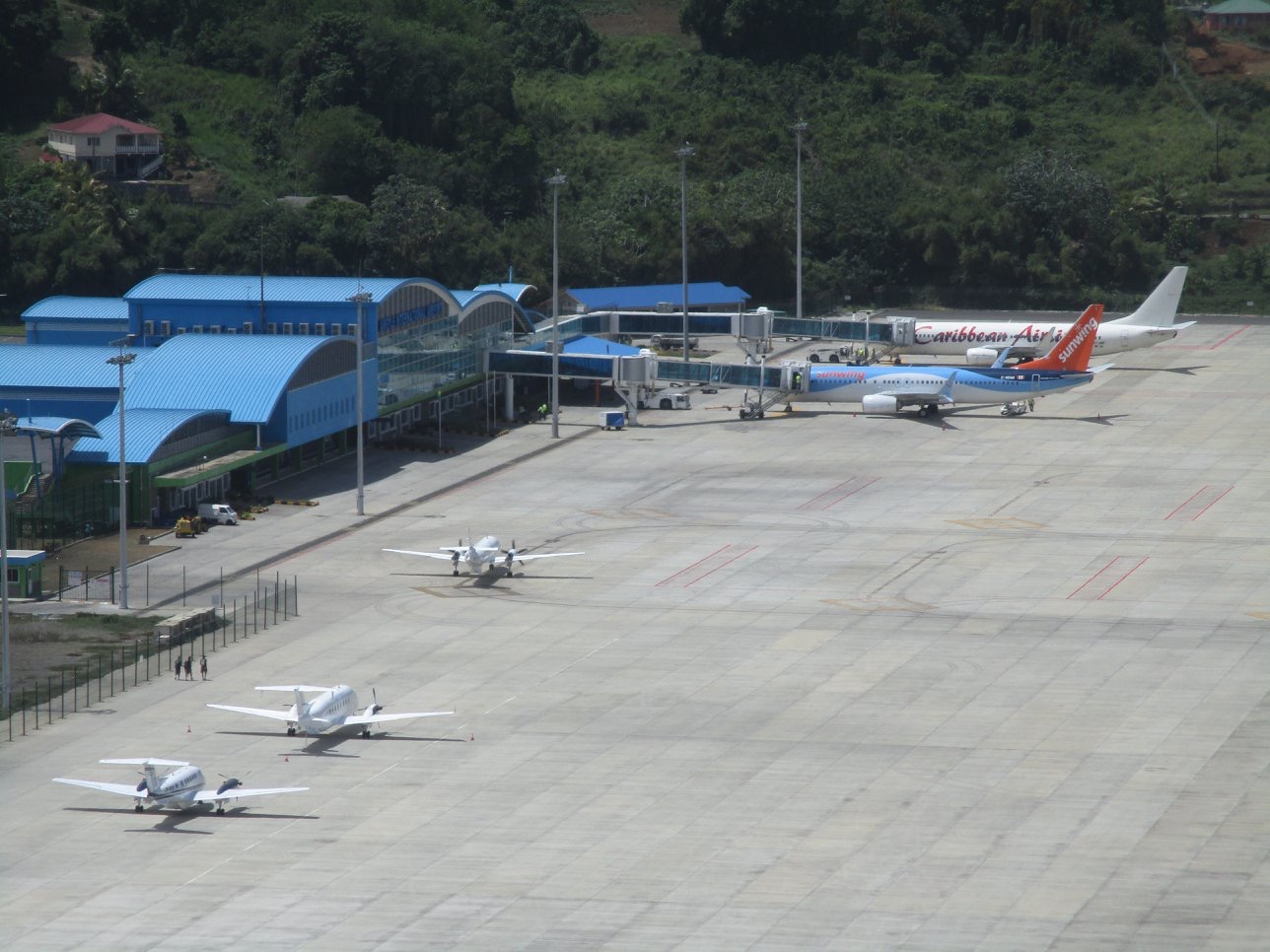
Argyle International Airport terminal

This is a list of airports in Saint Vincent and the Grenadines, sorted by location.

Saint Vincent and the Grenadines lies to the west of Barbados, south of Saint Lucia, and north of Grenada in the Windward Islands of the Lesser Antilles, an island arc of the Caribbean Sea. The islands of Saint Vincent and the Grenadines include the main island of Saint Vincent 344 km^{2} (133 sq mi) and the northern two-thirds of the Grenadines 45 km^{2} (17 sq mi), which are a chain of smaller islands stretching south from Saint Vincent to Grenada. There are 32 islands and cays that make up St Vincent and the Grenadines (SVG). Nine are inhabited, including the mainland St. Vincent, Young Island, Bequia, Mustique, Canouan, Union Island, Mayreau, Petit St Vincent and Palm Island. The capital of Saint Vincent and the Grenadines is Kingstown.

The main island of Saint Vincent measures 26 km (16 mi) long, 15 km (9.3 mi) in width and 344 km^{2} (133 sq mi) in area. From the most northern to the most southern points, the Grenadine islands belonging to Saint Vincent span 60.4 km (37.5 mi) with a combined area of 45 km^{2} (17 sq mi).

== Airports ==
Location	ICAO	IATA	Airport name	Coordinates
St.Vincent(Mainland)	TVSA	SVD	Argyle International Airport (AIA)	13°09′23″N 061°09′01″W
Bequia, Grenadines	TVSB	BQU	J. F. Mitchell Airport	12°59′18″N 061°15′43″W
Canouan, Grenadines	TVSC	CIW	Canouan Airport	12°41′57″N 061°20′33″W
Mustique, Grenadines	TVSM	MQS	Mustique Airport	12°53′17″N 061°10′49″W
Union Island, Grenadines	TVSU	UNI	Union Island Airport	12°35′55″N 061°24′53″W

Argyle International Airport located about 5.17 miles (8.32 km) from Kingstown, replaced the E.T. Joshua Airport on February 14, 2017.

== See also ==
- Transport in Saint Vincent and the Grenadines
- List of airports by ICAO code: T#TV - Saint Vincent and the Grenadines
- "IATA Airline and Airport Code Search". International Air Transport Association.
- Wikipedia: WikiProject Aviation/Airline destination lists: North America#Saint Vincent and the Grenadines
