= LIAT Flight 319 =

1986 aviation accident

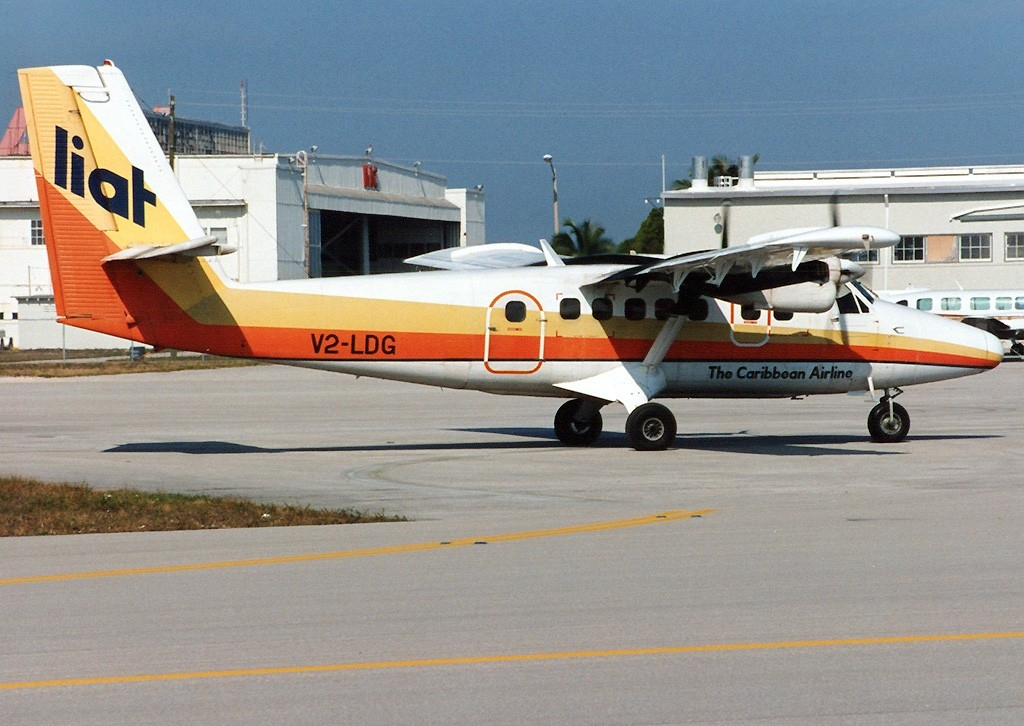
- A LIAT Series 300 Twin Otter similar to the accident aircraft

Accident
- Date: 3 August 1986
- Summary: Crashed into the sea in poor weather
- Site: Near E. T. Joshua Airport, Saint Vincent and the Grenadines; Caribbean Sea, 13.137335°N 61.218879°W

Aircraft
- Aircraft type: de Havilland Canada DHC-6 Series 310 Twin Otter
- Operator: LIAT
- Registration: V2-LCJ
- Flight origin: Hewanorra International Airport, Vieux Fort, Saint Lucia
- Destination: E. T. Joshua Airport, Saint Vincent and the Grenadines
- Occupants: 13
- Passengers: 11
- Crew: 2
- Fatalities: 13 (presumed)
- Survivors: 0 (presumed)

LIAT Flight 319 was a scheduled Caribbean inter-island flight from Hewanorra International Airport in Saint Lucia to E. T. Joshua Airport in St. Vincent and the Grenadines. On 3 August 1986, the 19-seater de Havilland Canada DHC-6 Twin Otter airliner serving the flight, which was operated by Leeward Islands Air Transport (LIAT), disappeared, but is believed to have crashed into the Caribbean Sea, resulting in the deaths of its 11 passengers and 2 aircrew.

== Aircraft ==
The aircraft involved in the accident was a de Havilland Canada DHC-6 Twin Otter 310, with manufacturer serial number 785, registered as V2-LCJ. This airliner first flew in 1982. The aircraft was powered by two Pratt & Whitney Canada PT6A-27. It was capable of accommodating 19 passengers.

== Accident ==
On Sunday 4 August 1986, LIAT Flight 319 departed from Hewanorra International Airport in St. Lucia, en route to the E. T. Joshua Airport (then called the Arnos Vale airport) in St. Vincent and the Grenadines. On attempting to land at its destination the plane encountered difficulties due to a rainstorm. Two initial attempts were made to land the plane. The plane is believed to have crashed into the sea and sunk in water some 6,000 feet (1,800 m) deep during its third landing attempt.

Neither the bodies of the passengers and crew, nor the wreckage were discovered. The government of St. Vincent and the Grenadines declared everyone on board perished, after recovery attempts failed to locate any bodies six days after the crash.

== Victims ==
Seven of the passengers aboard Flight 319 were Vincentian nationals. There were also two Americans, two Italians, one Canadian and one Antiguan among the flight's passengers and crew. Among the victims of the accident was former deputy prime minister Hudson Tannis.
