= Argyle International Airport =

International airport serving Saint Vincent, Saint Vincent and the Grenadines

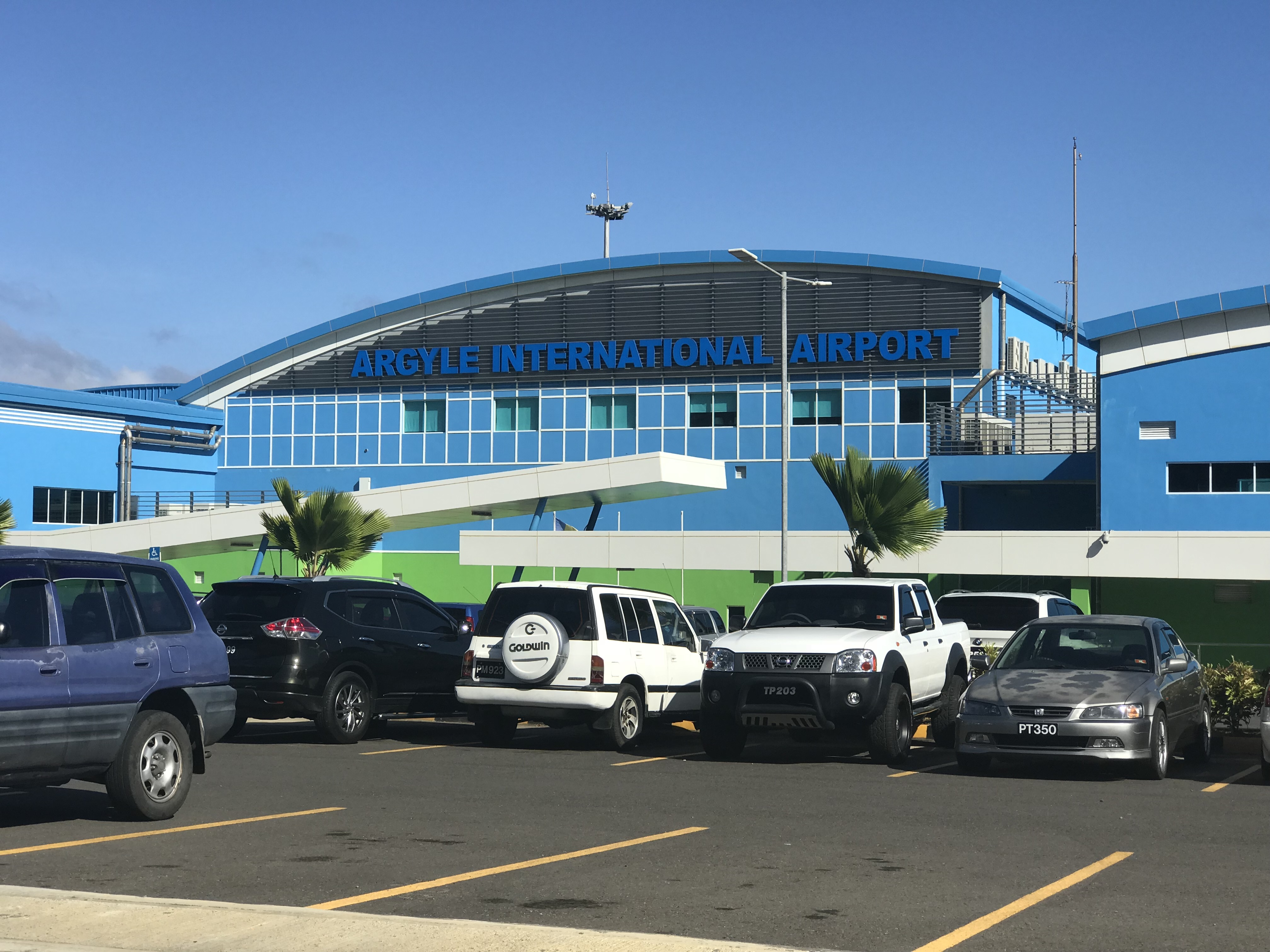
- IATA: SVD; ICAO: TVSA

Summary
- Airport type: Public
- Owner: Government of Saint Vincent and the Grenadines
- Operator: Argyle International Airport Inc. Josette Greaves (CEO); Godfred Pompey (Chairman)
- Serves: Saint Vincent, Saint Vincent and the Grenadines
- Location: Argyle
- Opened: 14 February 2017
- Hub for: Air Adelphi; LIAT20; Mustique Airways; SVG Air
- Time zone: AST (UTC−04:00)
- Elevation AMSL: 136 ft (41 m)
- Coordinates: 13°09′23″N 061°09′01″W
- Website: www.svg-airport.com

Map
- Location in Saint Vincent and the Grenadines

Runways
Direction	Length		Surface
Direction	m	ft	Surface
04/22	2,743	9,000	Asphalt

Helipads
Number	Length		Surface
Number	m	ft	Surface
H1	16	60	Asphalt

Statistics (2023)
- Passengers: 610,859
- Source: general specifications. Coordinates are approximate.

Argyle International Airport (IATA: SVD, ICAO: TVSA) (often referred to as Argyle Airport or simply AIA) is an international airport on the island of Saint Vincent in the Caribbean nation of Saint Vincent and the Grenadines. It is located in Argyle, about 5.17 miles (8.32 km) from the capital Kingstown.

The airport is one of St. Vincent and the Grenadines' most important infrastructure assets and the country's first international airport. It is the largest international gateway into the country and connects St. Vincent and the Grenadines to major airports, such as Hartsfield–Jackson Atlanta International Airport, Miami International Airport, John F. Kennedy International Airport, Toronto Pearson International Airport, London Heathrow Airport as well as other airports in the Caribbean.

It is the largest of five airports in the multi-island nation of St. Vincent and the Grenadines, the others being J. F. Mitchell Airport in Bequia, Canouan Airport, Mustique Airport and Union Island Airport, all in the Grenadines. Argyle International Airport serves as a major gateway to the Grenadines, with several airlines operating an extensive network of direct domestic flights from AIA to all destinations in the Grenadines.

The airport is the second solar powered airport in the Caribbean, following V. C. Bird International Airport in Antigua.

== History ==
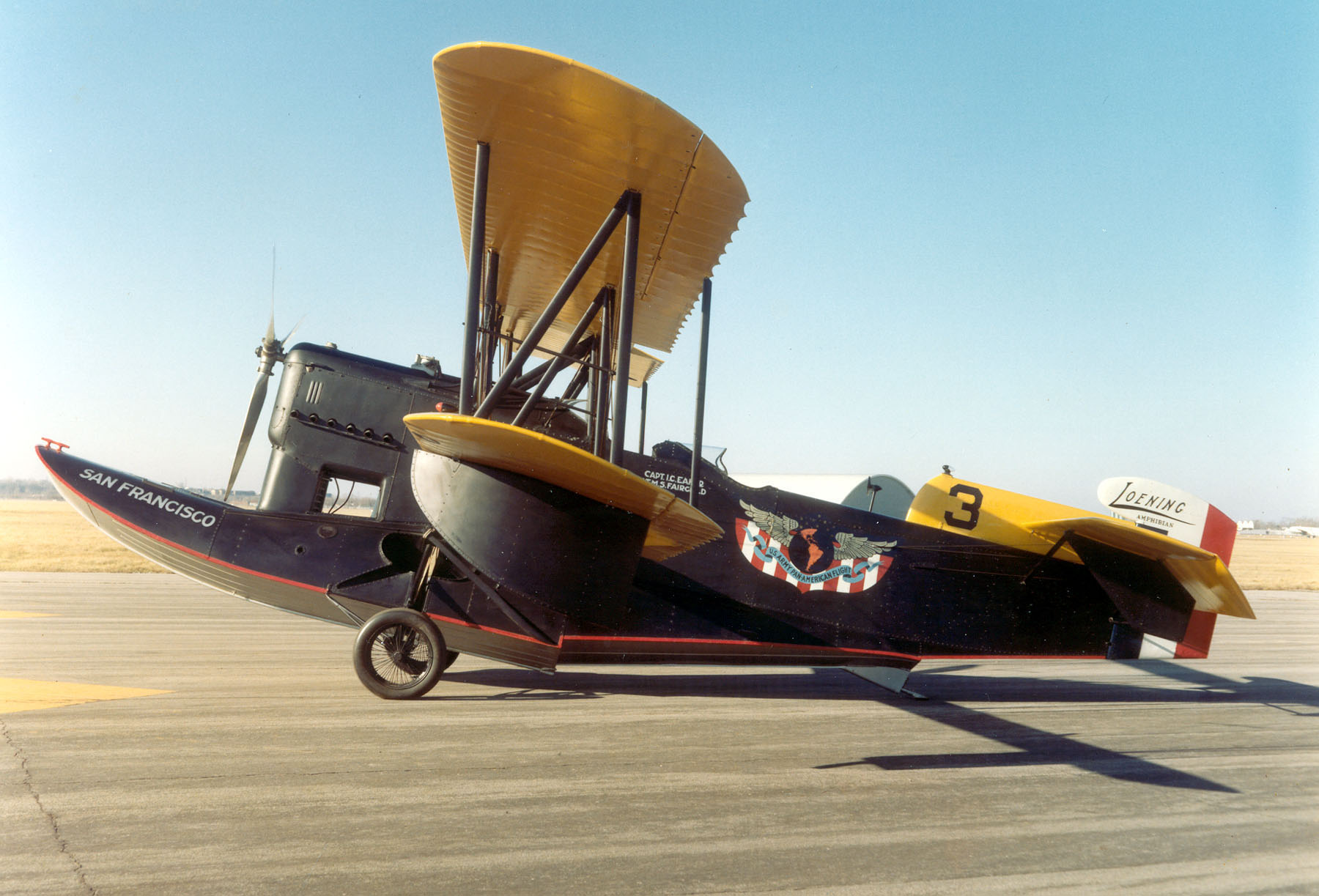
San Francisco (26-431): one of four Loening OA-1A amphibian planes that landed at Kingstown harbor in 1927

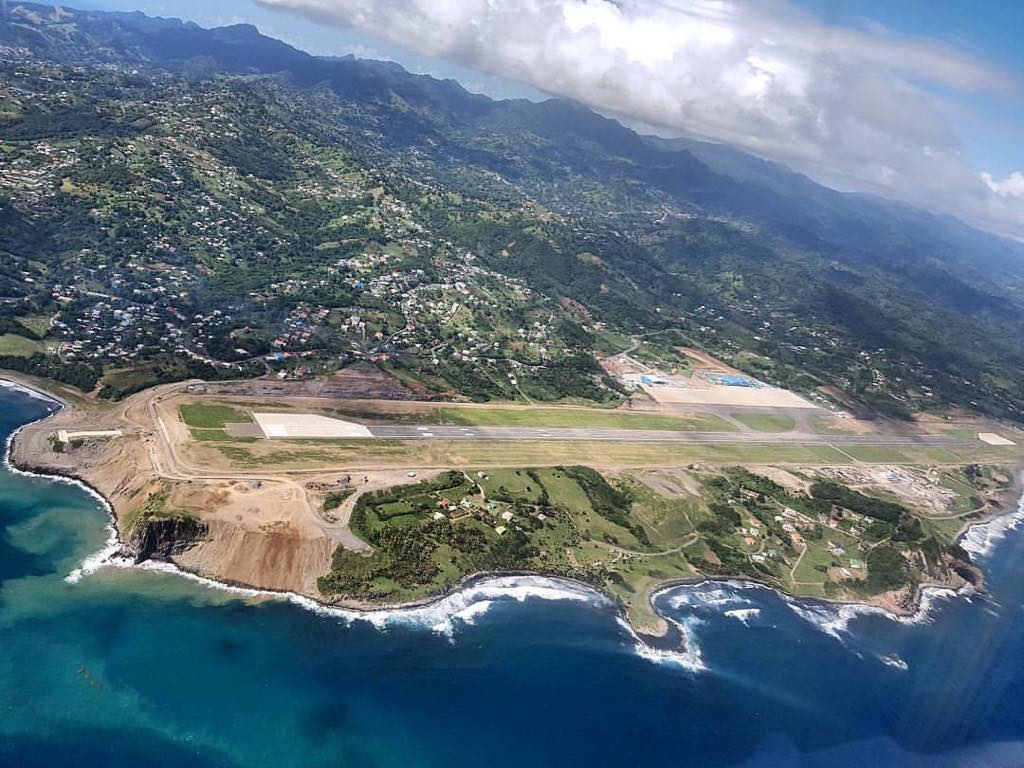
An aerial view of Runway 04/22 at AIA, showing nearby low mountainous terrain west of the airport

The project broke ground on 13 August 2008, with a work team of Vincentians and Cubans (nicknamed the "Chatoyer-Che Contingent" by Vincentian Prime Minister Ralph Gonsalves), and the airport officially opened on 14 February 2017 when a Dynamic Airways charter flight became the first international aircraft to touch down at Argyle. The Argyle International Airport replaced the much smaller E.T. Joshua Airport as St. Vincent and the Grenadines’ principal airport. During the construction of the new airport, the International Airport Development Company (IADC) faced numerous challenges and controversies, causing major delays in the construction process. This resulted in the airport being completed five years after the originally forecasted completion date.

Argyle International Airport (AIA) was built on expropriated land in a rural part of St. Vincent's southeast coast, in response to the growing airport traffic needs that the E.T. Joshua Airport could not accommodate and also, because the latter had reached its saturation point with no physical space for further growth. The new airport is able to handle 1.5 million passengers per year, more than four times the capacity at E.T. Joshua and offers 23 commercial spaces, three restaurants and several spots for kiosks. The airport is expected to increase the accessibility to this multi-island destination and be a key economic driver for the country, attracting direct flights from Canada, the US, the UK and more, fueling investments.

The airport commenced full operations on 14 February 2017, replacing the decommissioned E.T. Joshua Airport. Argyle International Airport is the only airport in St. Vincent and the Grenadines that offers international scheduled flights and is also served by scheduled, low-fare, business and charter carriers, with many services operated to the U.S. and Canada. It also supports corporate and general aviation. Argyle International Airport is the largest capital project in the history of the country, with an estimated cost of construction of XCD$700 million (USD$259 million) and an actual estimated value in excess of XCD$1 billion.

== Operations ==
The airport is a primary hub for SVG Air, a national airline of St. Vincent and the Grenadines, along with Mustique Airways. SVG Air and Mustique Airways have combined to form SVG Air-Grenadine Air Alliance, operating 17 aircraft, with bases in St. Vincent, Antigua and Grenada, offering visitors and residents a wider choice of international gateways in and out of St. Vincent & the Grenadines. Numerous inter-island flights are available daily.

Air Canada Rouge, American Airlines, Caribbean Airlines, Delta Air Lines, Virgin Atlantic, InterCaribbean Airways, LIAT, SVG Air, Mustique Airways and One Caribbean currently provide regularly scheduled passenger services at Argyle International Airport. EasySky, which began flying to St. Vincent from Havana, Cuba in June 2017, is currently [as of when?] in negotiations with authorities to recommence its twice weekly service. Argyle International Airport has non-stop flights to Canada, the United States and the United Kingdom. The airport receives many international charter flights and is also an important freight airport, which provides cold storage and standard cargo transport. Amerijet International, increased their airlift capacity, using larger aircraft, such as the Boeing 767-300, to move more cargo into and out of St. Vincent and the Grenadines.

The busiest international routes are Toronto and New York, while the busiest regional routes remain Barbados and Trinidad. One Caribbean has filed an application for a Foreign Air Carrier Permit with the US Department of Transportation (USDOT) ahead of plans to offer ad hoc charter flights to any point(s) in the United States from St. Vincent & the Grenadines and other OECS (Organisation of Eastern Caribbean States) countries.

The following airlines operate regular scheduled, charter flights, domestic and international flights to and from Argyle International Airport:

== Airlines and destinations ==
=== Passenger ===
Airlines	Destinations
Air Adelphi	Seasonal charter: Catries, Fort-de-France, Mustique
Air Canada	Toronto–Pearson
American Airlines	Miami; Seasonal: Charlotte, New York–JFK
Caribbean Airlines	Barbados, New York–JFK, Port of Spain
InterCaribbean Airways	Barbados, Castries, Grenada
JetBlue	New York–JFK
Liat Air	Antigua
Mustique Airways	Mustique
Sunrise Airways	Antigua, Castries, Dominica–Douglas-Charles
SVG Air	Antigua, Barbados, Bequia, Canouan, Carriacou, Castries, Dominica–Canefield, Grenada, Union Island
Virgin Atlantic	Barbados, London–Heathrow
Winair	Castries, St. Maarten

=== Cargo ===
Airlines	Destinations
Air Cargo Carriers	Castries, Dominica–Douglas-Charles, San Juan, St. Kitts
Amerijet International	Barbados, Miami, Port of Spain, St. Lucia–Hewanorra
DHL Aviation	Castries, Fort-de-France, Grenada, Port of Spain
FedEx Express	Aguadilla, Castries, Fort-de-France, Grenada

== Statistics ==
Busiest international flights out of Argyle International Airport by frequency as of 2024
Rank	Destinations (operated by)	Frequency (weekly)	Carriers
1	Barbados	38	LIAT20, Inter Caribbean, Caribbean Airlines
2	Port of Spain	23	Caribbean Airlines, LIAT, One Caribbean, SVG Air
3	Saint Lucia	9	LIAT, Mustique Airways, One Caribbean, SVG Air
4	Atlanta	7	Delta Air Lines
5	Miami	7	American Airlines
6	Grenada	5	LIAT, One Caribbean, SVG Air, Inter Caribbean
7	Toronto	2	Air Canada
8	London	2	Virgin Atlantic
9	New York City	2	JetBlue Airways, American Airlines, Caribbean Airlines
10	Caracas	1	Conviasa
11	Havana	1	Conviasa
12	Charlotte	1	American Airlines

== Incidents and accidents ==
- 29 August 2018 – Caribbean Airlines Boeing 737-85P (WL) flight BW552 suffered a suspected bird strike and subsequent engine vibrations after takeoff from Argyle International Airport (AIA), St. Vincent and the Grenadines on a flight to John F Kennedy International Airport, New York City. The flight crew decided to divert to the home base at Piarco International Airport, Trinidad and Tobago. A safe landing was made at Piarco International Airport at 14:35 UTC, 65 minutes after takeoff, where it was taken out of service for maintenance by the airline's engineers. The airline says passengers on flight BW552 were re-accommodated on a later service to JFK International Airport.
- 26 August 2019 – A Saab 340 aircraft belonging to One Caribbean, apparently developed issues while departing from Argyle International Airport for Piarco International Airport in Trinidad and Tobago and skidded off the runway. The aircraft was not damaged and there were no injuries to the passengers.
- 5 June 2021 - American Airlines flight 1427 to Miami had to return to Argyle because of a bird strike. No one was reported injured in the aircraft, a Boeing 737-800. The incident was caught live by an aircraft spotter on video.

== Controversy ==
The new airport was originally scheduled to open in 2011. The project costs were in excess of EC $729 million by February 2016, with increases in costs expected as well as further delays.

In a "historic" address on 8 August 2005, Prime Minister Gonsalves stated, "Foreign investors often shy away from St. Vincent and the Grenadines when the limitations of air access arise due to the absence of an international airport." Critics have responded saying that the prime minister's statement is invalid and incorrect: on the contrary, many foreign concerns have invested in St. Vincent and the Grenadines from as early as the 1960s, after the Arnos Vale airport was constructed (and later renamed in memory of E.T. Joshua).

== See also ==
- Grenadine Islands
- List of airlines of Saint Vincent and the Grenadines
- List of airports in Saint Vincent and the Grenadines
- List of airports in the Caribbean
- List of flying boats and floatplanes
- Saint Vincent and the Grenadines
- Sustainable development
- Transport in Saint Vincent and the Grenadines
