= Grenadine Airways =

Vincentian airline

IATA	ICAO	Call sign
-	-	-
- Hubs: Argyle International Airport
- Headquarters: Argyle, Saint Vincent and the Grenadines
- Website: http://www.grenadine-airways.com/

Grenadine Airways is an airline based in Saint Vincent and the Grenadines.

== Services ==
- Mustique
- Union Island
- Canouan
- St Vincent
- Barbados
- Martinique
- Grenada
- St. Barths
- Saint Martin
- Saint Lucia
