= SVG Air =

Flag carrier of Saint Vincent and the Grenadines

SVG AIR
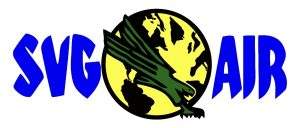
IATA	ICAO	Call sign
--	SVG	Grenadines
- Founded: 1990
- Hubs: Argyle International Airport
- Fleet size: 12
- Destinations: 10+
- Headquarters: Argyle, Saint Vincent and the Grenadines
- Website: flysvgair.com

SVG AIR is an airline company located at the Argyle International Airport, Argyle, Saint Vincent and the Grenadines that operates both scheduled and charter flight services within the Eastern Caribbean islands as far north as Jamaica and as far south as Guyana.

St. Vincent and the Grenadines Air or SVG AIR, is a national airline of St. Vincent and the Grenadines, along with Mustique Airways. SVG Air and Mustique Airways have combined to form a SVG Air / Grenadine Alliance, operating 17 aircraft, with bases in St. Vincent, Antigua and Grenada. Offering visitors and residents a wider choice of International Gateways in and out of St. Vincent & the Grenadines.

SVG AIR's main operating base is in St. Vincent but has a maintenance hangar on the island of Bequia and other bases in Barbados, Grenada, Carriacou, Antigua and Barbuda, Montserrat and the Grenadine islands of: Bequia, Canouan and Union Island.

== Destinations ==
SVG AIR have regular scheduled flights from the Argyle International Airport to locations across the caribbean.

Country	City	Airports	Notes	Ref.
Antigua and Barbuda	Saint John's	V.C. Bird International Airport		
Barbados Barbados	Bridgetown	Grantley Adams International Airport		
Dominica	Roseau	Dominica–Canefield		
Grenada	Carriacou	Lauriston Airport		
Grenada	St. George's	Maurice Bishop International Airport		
Martinique	Fort-de-France	Martinique Aimé Césaire International Airport		
Saint Lucia	Castries	Hewanorra International Airport		
St. Lucia	Castries	George F. L. Charles Airport		
St Vincent and the Grenadines	Bequia	J. F. Mitchell Airport		
St Vincent and the Grenadines	Canouan	Canouan Airport		
St Vincent and the Grenadines	Kingstown	Argyle International Airport	Hub	
St Vincent and the Grenadines	Mustique	Mustique Airport		
St Vincent and the Grenadines	Union Island	Union Island Airport		

== History ==
The airline was founded in 1990. It began operations with a single leased Britten-Norman Islander. The company is largely owned (75%) by St Vincent Grenada Air and operated by the Gravel and Barnard families. The airline does not have an IATA code. Its ICAO code is SVG, and its callsign is "Grenadines."

== Fleet ==
The SVG Air fleet comprises the following aircraft (as of August 2018):

SVG Air fleet
Aircraft	In service	Orders	Passengers	Notes
De Havilland Canada DHC-6-300 Twin Otter	8	—	19	(as of August 2025)
Britten-Norman BN2A Islander	3	—	9	
Cessna CE-525B Citation Jet 3	1	—	9	
Total	12			

The SVG Air fleet previously included the following aircraft (as of March 2007):

- 3 Aero Commander
- 2 Cessna 402

They have been leasing another Cessna Citation II 550 privately registered J8-JTS, and their own Cessna CE-525B Citation Jet 3 has been registered J8-JET used for charter flights.

== Incidents and accidents ==
- 19 November 2006 - SVG Air Aero Commander 500S, disappeared on final approach to Saint Vincent, presumably killing both the pilot and sole passenger. The aircraft's wreckage was later found in the sea.
- 22 October 2007 - SVG Cessna 402, registered J8-VBL, with six passengers and a pilot suffered extensive damage when it overran the runway and crashed into the Union Island Airport fence.
- 5 August 2010 - SVG Cessna 402C Aircraft (J8-SXY) on a flight from Saint Vincent to Canouan crashed off Canouan with only the pilot on board - not found.
- 29 September 2021—SVG Air Flight 207—a Britten-Norman BN-2B-26 Islander aircraft, operated by SVG Air between, overran the runway at John A. Osborne Airport while on a flight between Antigua and Barbuda and Montserrat. Two of the seven occupants sustained injuries and the airplane was severely damaged.
