= Mustique Airways =

Vincentian and Grenadinian airline

IATA	ICAO	Call sign
-	MAW	MUSTIQUE
- Founded: 1979
- Hubs: Argyle International Airport
- Secondary hubs: Mustique Airport
- Focus cities: Kingstown [Argyle Intl], Mustique, Barbados
- Fleet size: 9
- Destinations: 11
- Headquarters: Argyle International Airport, Saint Vincent and the Grenadines
- Website: http://www.mustique.com/

Mustique Airways is an airline based in Saint Vincent and the Grenadines. It was founded by Michel Seydoux after built his house on Mustique Island in 1978, and was incorporated in 1979, providing a service between St. Vincent and Mustique. Pilot and manager Johnathan Palmer purchased the airline in 1992 and developed the company to its height. Due to the increase in passengers over time, the administrative and corporate offices were moved to the island of Saint Vincent at Argyle International Airport.

During Palmer's tenure at the company, he raised funds for and built the hangar at Arnos Vale. Following this development, Mustique Airways started to service planes and train pilots that later fly for other airlines like Emirates and Virgin Atlantic.

Mustique Airways only operates with private charter planes and does not have a schedule for regular flights. In February 2017, the airway joined with SVG Air to form the Grenadine Air Alliance, which operates 17 aircraft.

In 2017, the airline was briefly added to the European Union's airline blacklist due to safety concerns, but was removed the same year. The airline later implemented "electronic flight bags" as a further safety measure, following industry standard updates.

== Fleet size ==
=== Current fleet ===
Mustique airways fleet consists of the following aircraft (as of August 2024).

Mustique Airways fleet
Aircraft	In Fleet	Orders	Passengers	
Aircraft	In Fleet	C	Y	Total
Britten-Norman BN-2 Islander	2	—	9	9
Aero Commander AC500	1		5	5
Total	3	—		

== Services and destinations ==
Mustique airways operate to the following destinations as of August 2021.

Regional/domestic operations
Country	IATA	ICAO	Airport
Mustique	MQS	TVSM	Mustique Airport
Union Island	UNI	TVSU	Union Island Airport
Canouan	CIW	TVSC	Canouan Airport
Carriacou	CRU	TGPZ	Lauriston airport
Saint Vincent and the Grenadines	SVD	TVSA	Argyle International Airport
Barbados	BGI	TBPB	Grantley Adams International Airport
Martinique	FDF	TFFF	Martinique Aimé Césaire International Airport
Grenada	GND	TGPY	Maurice Bishop International Airport
St. Barths	SBH	TFFJ	Gustaf III Airport
Saint Martin	SXM	TNCM	Princess Juliana International Airport
Saint Lucia	UVF	TLPL	Hewanorra International Airport

Mustique Airways also provides charter services throughout the Eastern Caribbean.
