= Air Adelphi =

Airline based in Saint Vincent and the Grenadines

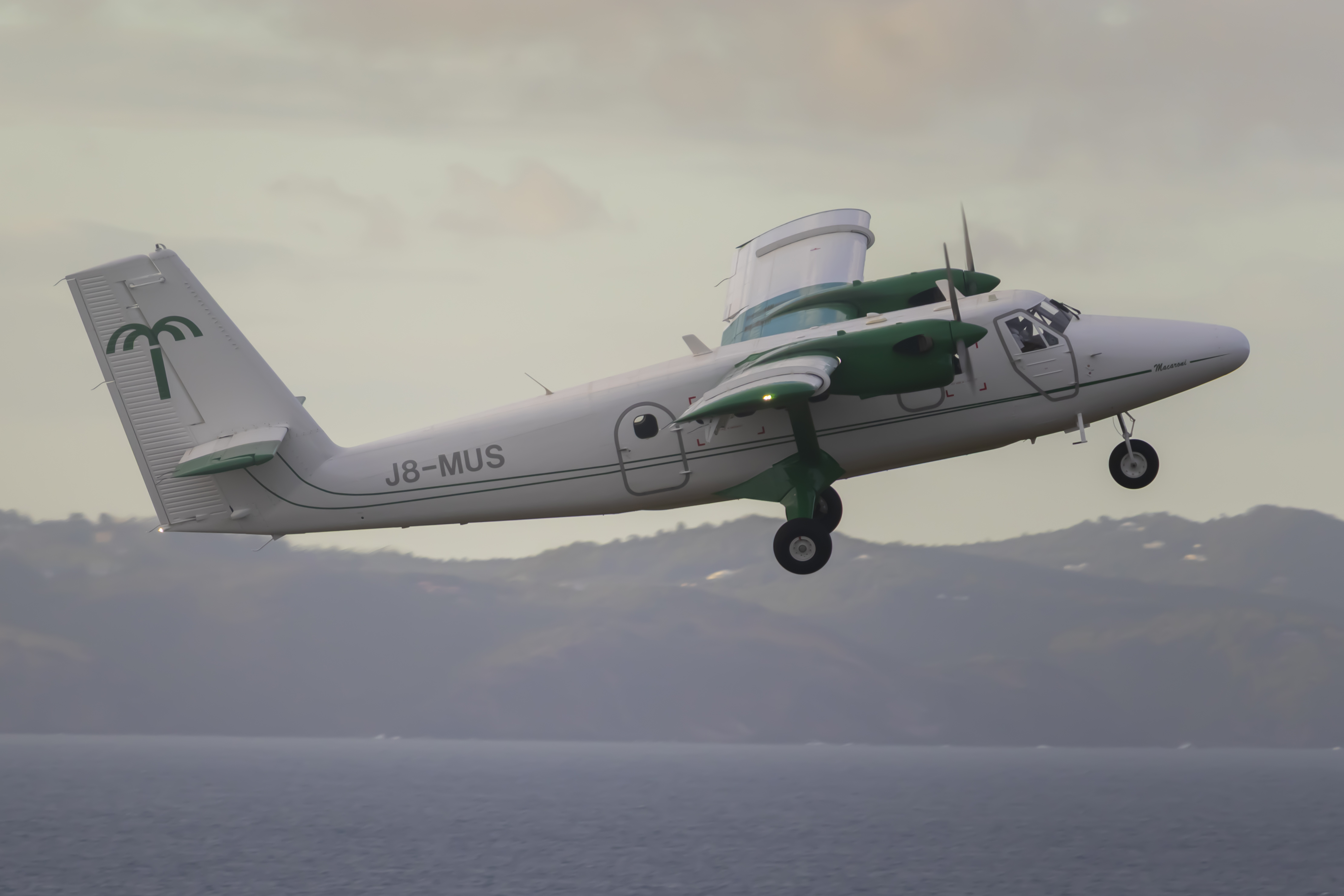
IATA	ICAO	Call sign
—	MUS	ADELPHI
- Commenced operations: 2022
- Fleet size: 5
- Destinations: 5
- Parent company: The Mustique Company
- Website: airadelphi.com

Air Adelphi (ICAO: MUS) is a passenger and charter airline owned by the Mustique Company based in St. Vincent and the Grenadines.

== History ==
Air Adelphi was established by the Mustique Company. Although it first became active in a charter capacity much earlier, it was fully licensed as an air carrier in 2022. On April 15, 2024, it began to expand to other islands in the region, including Martinique, St. Vincent, St. Lucia, and Barbados, with flights on Mondays, Wednesdays, and Fridays.

== Destinations ==
The airline operates regularly scheduled commercial flights between destinations in the Lesser Antilles.

- St. Vincent and the Grenadines
  - Argyle - Argyle International Airport
- St. Lucia
  - Vieux Fort - Hewanorra International Airport
- Barbados
  - Seawell - Grantley Adams International Airport
- Martinique
  - Le Lamentin - Martinique Aimé Césaire International Airport

It also operates regular charter flights between the above destinations and Mustique, in Saint Vincent and the Grenadines.

== Fleet ==
5 x De Havilland Canada DHC-6 Twin Otter
