= Transport in Saint Vincent and the Grenadines =

There are no railways in Saint Vincent and the Grenadines.

As of 1996, there were 829 km of highways, of which 580 km are paved.

Ports and harbours: Kingstown

Merchant marine:
total: 825 ships (1,000 GT or over) totaling 7,253,092 GT/10,894,566 tonnes deadweight (DWT)
ships by type: barge carrier 1, bulk 142, cargo 400, chemical tanker 31, combination bulk 10, combination ore/oil 5, container 47, liquified gas 5, livestock carrier 5, multi-functional large load carrier 3, passenger 3, petroleum tanker 60, refrigerated cargo 41, roll-on/roll-off 51, short-sea passenger 12, specialized tanker 8, vehicle carrier 1 (1999 est.)
note: a flag of convenience registry; includes ships from 20 countries among which are Croatia 17, Slovenia 7, People's Republic of China 5, Greece 5, United Arab Emirates 3, Norway 2, Japan 2, and Ukraine 2 (1998 est.)

Airports: 6 (2005)

Airports - with paved runways:
total: 5
914 to 1,523 m: 4
under 914 m: 1 (2005)

There is one airport with an unpaved runway, under 914 m (2005 est.)

== See also ==
- Saint Vincent and the Grenadines
- List of airports in Saint Vincent and the Grenadines
- List of airlines of Saint Vincent and the Grenadines
