= Canouan =

Island in Saint Vincent and the Grenadines

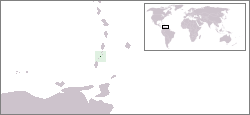
- Location of Canouan
- Interactive map of Canouan

Geography
- Location: Caribbean Sea
- Coordinates: 12°43′N 61°20′W
- Archipelago: Grenadines
- Total islands: 1
- Area: 2.93 sq mi (7.6 km^{2})
- Highest elevation: 877 ft (267.3 m)
- Highest point: Mount Royal

Administration
- Saint Vincent and the Grenadines

Demographics
- Population: 1700 (2012)

Additional information
- IUCN category IV (habitat/species management area)
- Area: 1,250.7 km^{2} (482.9 sq mi)
- Website: Canouan in Saint Vincent and the Grenadines

Canouan (/ˈkænuæn/) is an island in the Grenadines. It is a small island, measuring only 5.6 by 2 km (3.5 by 1.2 mi), and has a surface of 7.6 km^{2}. It lies approximately 40 km (25 mi) south of the island of St. Vincent. The population is about 1,700. The largest settlement on the island is Charlestown.

A barrier reef runs along the Atlantic side of Canouan, and the highest point on the island is Mount Royal. Two bays, Glossy and Friendship, are located on the southern side of the island.

Canouan is commonly nicknamed "The Billionaire's Island" because it functions as an exclusive retreat for wealthy individuals and celebrities seeking privacy.

== History ==
Some time prior to 200 BCE, a cultivated tribe called the Arawaks reached the island using dug-out canoes. These new residents brought plants, animals, and basic farming and fishing skills with them. They lived there for 1,500 years until the Caribs invaded the island.

More than 200 years after Christopher Columbus laid eyes on St. Vincent, the Europeans established a kind of permanent settlement. Its mountainous and heavily forested geography allowed the Caribs to defend against European settlement here longer than on almost any other island in the Caribbean.

After the Caribs were defeated on other islands they joined slaves who had escaped repression on Barbados by following the current and trade winds westward to St. Vincent, as well as those who had survived shipwrecks near St. Vincent and Bequia.

The mixed descendants of the island warriors and the freed Africans, who became known as the Black Caribs, had a common distrust and disgust for the Europeans, and proved to be a fearsome foe. The Caribs feared complete domination so they allowed the French to construct a settlement on the island in 1719. The French brought slaves to work their plantations. By 1748, the Treaty of Aix-la-Chapelle officially declared St. Vincent and its surrounding islands to be a neutral island, controlled by neither Britain nor France. The two countries continued to contest control of the islands, however, until they were definitively ceded to the British in 1814.

In 1951, universal adult suffrage was introduced in Saint Vincent and the Grenadines, and in 1979, it became an independent state within the British Commonwealth with a democratic government based on the British system.

Hurricane Beryl caused extensive destruction when it passed over the island in July 2024, destroying over 90% of homes and businesses, along with port infrastructure and airport buildings.

== Climate ==
The average daytime temperatures range from 24 to 30 °C (75 to 86 °F). The driest season is from December to May. The coolest months are between November and February.

== Resort development ==
In the early 1990s, the Canouan Resorts Development company was formed by Italian banker Antonio Saladino, Irish financier Dermot Desmond and Italian fintech billionaire Andrea Pignataro. They secured a lease from the government for areas of the island to build two hotels - the former Raffles Resort site and Tamarind Beach Hotel site. At this point the building arm of the company built roads throughout Canouan (previously only dirt tracks), installed electricity to the island and residents houses and provided desalinated water for the first time. Prior to that, fresh water was brought by boat from St. Vincent on a regular basis. Locals not employed by the resort are forbidden admittance to the property as it is private property. The beaches remain open for public use but, controversially, access is forbidden by road. In 2010 it was announced that the resort would revert from Raffles/Fairmont Resorts back to Carenage Bay Resort. The property then became Pink Sands Club which opened in 2016. In 2018 the newer section of the property became managed by Mandarin Oriental. The original villas and suites now make up Canouan Estate Resort & Villas. The 1200-acre estate includes a collection of luxury suites and villas. Amenities include four beaches, four restaurants and bars, a Jim Fazio designed 18-hole golf course, a fitness centre and marine activities. The resort is open year-round.

== Education ==
There are 2 schools on Canouan - the Government Primary school and the Canouan Secondary School which opened in September 2019. Both Schools are located in the same building with the Secondary School located at the top and primary school at the bottom. There is also an official Canouan Pre-school and Private Pre-school called Coral Reef located close to the primary school and Secondary School.

== Transport ==
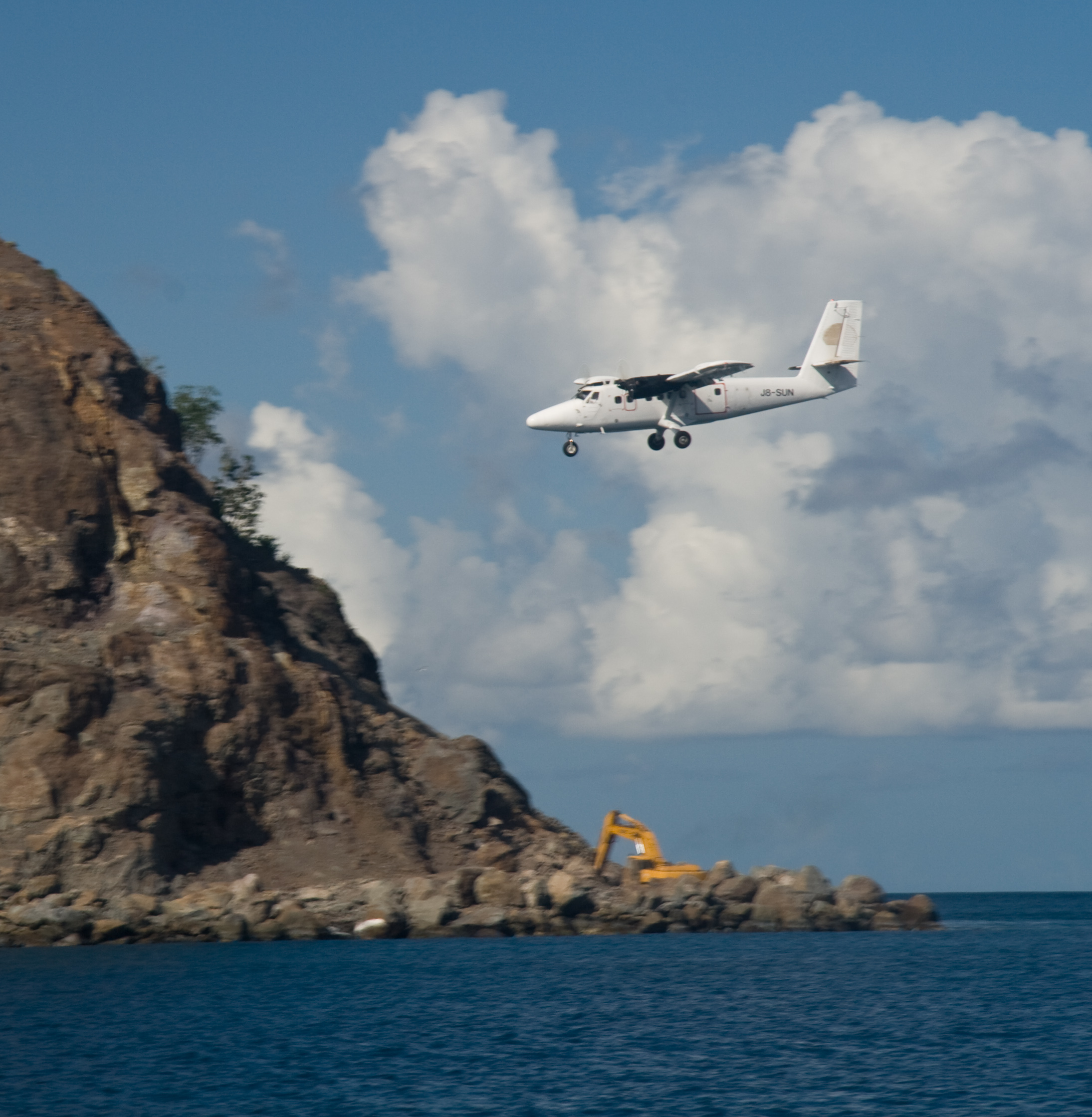
Plane Landing at Canouan.

In 2008, the runway at Canouan Airport was lengthened to almost 6,000 feet to accommodate larger aircraft. It is now the jet port for the Grenadines.

Scheduled ferries link Canouan to St. Vincent, Union Island and Mayreau.

== In popular culture ==
The Cayo Perico Heist update for Grand Theft Auto Online, released on December 15, 2020, saw the addition of a fictional island called Cayo Perico to the game's map. The island is similar in shape to Canouan and is also located in the Caribbean.

== Notable people ==
- Adonal Foyle, National Basketball Association player and political activist
- Sir John Compton, Prime Minister of St. Lucia
