= List of airports in the Caribbean =

This is a list of airports in the Caribbean, sorted by location.

The following categories contain lists of all Caribbean airports with Wikipedia articles:

- Category:Airports in Anguilla
- Category:Airports in Saint Vincent and the Grenadines

Some Caribbean airports without articles can be found in the following manually maintained lists:

== Anguilla ==
Country	Location	ICAO	IATA	Airport name	Coordinates
Anguilla	The Valley	TQPF	AXA	Clayton J. Lloyd International Airport	18°12′17″N 63°03′18″W

== Aruba ==
City served	ICAO	IATA	Airport name	Coordinates
Oranjestad	TNCA	AUA	Queen Beatrix International Airport Formerly Dakota Field	12°30′05″N 70°00′55″W

== Bahamas ==
Country	Location	ICAO	IATA	Airport name	Coordinates	Notes
Bahamas	Nassau	MYNN	NAS	Lynden Pindling International Airport		

== Barbados ==
Country	Location	ICAO	IATA	Airport name	Coordinates	Notes
Barbados	Seawell (Christ Church, Barbados)	TBPB	BGI	Grantley Adams International Airport	13°04′28″N 59°29′32″W	
Barbados	Bridgetown	TBPO		Bridgetown Heliport		Non-active

== Caribbean Netherlands ==
City served	ICAO	IATA	Airport name	Coordinates
Kralendijk, Bonaire	TNCB	BON	Flamingo International Airport	12°07′51″N 068°16′06″W
Saba	TNCS	SAB	Juancho E. Yrausquin Airport	17°38′43″N 063°13′14″W
Sint Eustatius	TNCE	EUX	F.D. Roosevelt Airport	17°29′47″N 062°58′45″W

== Cuba ==
Country	Location	ICAO	IATA	Airport name
Cuba	Baracoa (Guantánamo)	MUB	BCA	Gustavo Rizo Airport
Cuba	Bayamo (Granma)	MUBY	BYM	Carlos Manuel de Céspedes Airport
Cuba	Camagüey (Camagüey)	MUCM	CMW	Ignacio Agramonte International Airport
Cuba	Cayo Coco (Ciego de Ávila)	MUCC	CCC	Jardines del Rey Airport
Cuba	Cayo Largo del Sur (Isla de la Juventud)	MUCL	CYO	Vilo Acuña Airport (Juan Vitalio Acuña Airport)
Cuba	Cayo Santa Maria (Villa Clara)	MUBR	BWW	Las Brujas Airport
Cuba	Ciego de Ávila (Ciego de Ávila)	MUCA	AVI	Máximo Gómez Airport
Cuba	Cienfuegos (Cienfuegos)	MUCF	CFG	Jaime González Airport
Cuba	Florida (Camagüey)	MUFL		Florida Airport
Cuba	Guantánamo (Guantánamo)	MUGT	GAO	Mariana Grajales Airport
Cuba	Guardalavaca (Holguín)	MUGV		Guardalavaca Airport
Cuba	Havana	MUHA	HAV	José Martí International Airport
Cuba	Havana (Artemisa)	MUPB	UPB	Playa Baracoa Airport
Cuba	Holguín (Holguín)	MUHG	HOG	Frank País Airport
Cuba	Las Tunas (Las Tunas)	MUVT	VTU	Hermanos Ameijeiras Airport
Cuba	Manzanillo (Granma)	MUMZ	MZO	Sierra Maestra Airport
Cuba	Moa (Holguín)	MUMO	MOA	Orestes Acosta Airport
Cuba	Nueva Gerona (Isla de la Juventud)	MUNG	GER	Rafael Cabrera Airport (Rafael Cabrera Mustelier Airport)
Cuba	Nueva Gerona (Isla de la Juventud)	MUSN	SZJ	Siguanea Airport
Cuba	Pinar del Río (Pinar del Río)	MULM	LCL	La Coloma Airport
Cuba	Pinar del Río (Pinar del Río)	MUPR	QPD	Pinar del Río Airport
Cuba	Punta de Maisí (Guantánamo)	MUMA	UMA	Punta de Maisí Airport
Cuba	San Nicolás de Bari (Mayabeque)	MUNB	QSN	San Nicolás de Bari Airport
Cuba	Sancti Spíritus (Sancti Spíritus)	MUSS	USS	Sancti Spíritus Airport
Cuba	Santa Clara (Villa Clara)	MUSC	SNU	Abel Santamaría Airport
Cuba	Santa Lucía (Camagüey)	MUSL		Joaquín de Agüero Airport (Santa Lucia Airport)
Cuba	Santiago de Cuba (Santiago de Cuba)	MUCU	SCU	Antonio Maceo Airport
Cuba	Trinidad (Sancti Spíritus)	MUTD	TND	Alberto Delgado Airport
Cuba	Varadero (Matanzas)	MUVR	VRA	Juan Gualberto Gómez Airport
Cuba	Varadero (Matanzas)	MUKW		Kawama Airport
Military airports
Cuba	Guantánamo Bay (Guantánamo)	MUGM	NBW	Leeward Point Field (Naval Station Guantanamo Bay)
Cuba	Havana	MUMG		Managua Airport
Cuba	Havana	MULB		Ciudad Libertad Airport
Cuba	Pinar del Río (Pinar del Río)	MUSJ	SNJ	San Julian Air Base
Cuba	San Antonio de los Baños (Artemisa)	MUSA		San Antonio de los Baños Air Base

== Dominica ==
City	Airport	ICAO	IATA	Notes	References
Canefield	Canefield Airport	TDCF	DCF		
Marigot, Dominica	Douglas–Charles Airport (Also called/Formerly called Melville Hall)	TDPD	DOM		
Wesley, Dominica	Dominica International Airport	[----]	[---]	Under consturtion	

== Grenada ==
City/Town	Airport	ICAO	IATA	Notes
St. George's	Maurice Bishop International Airport	TGPY	GND	
Grenville	Pearls Airport	TGPG		Closed
Hillsborough	Lauriston Airport (Carriacou Island Airport)(	TGPZ	CRU	

== Jamaica ==
City	Airport	ICAO	IATA	Notes	References
Kingston	Norman Manley International Airport	[----]	KIN	[----]	
Kingston (Area)	Tinsen Pen Aerodrome	[----]	KTP	[----]	
Montego Bay	Sangsters International Airport	[----]	MBJ	[----]	
Negril	Negril Aerodrome	[----]	NEG	[----]	
Ocho Rios	Ian Flemming International Airport	[----]	OCJ	[----]	
Port Antonio	Ken Jones Aerodrome	[----]	POT	[----]	

Does not include all aerodromes, only the major airports. (Work In Progress)

== Montserrat ==
Country	Location	ICAO	IATA airport code	Airport name	Coordinates	Notes
Montserrat	Gerald's Park	TRPG	MNI	John A. Osborne Airport	16°47′29″N 62°11′36″W	
Montserrat	Plymouth	Formerly ~~TRPM~~	Formerly ~~MNI~~	W.H. Bramble Airport	16°45′32″N 62°9′23″W	Non-active

== Saint Lucia (Island) ==
See also: List of airports in Saint Lucia

Location Served	ICAO	IATA	Airport name	Coordinates
Castries	TLPC	SLU	George F. L. Charles Airport	14°01′13″N 060°59′35″W
Vieux-Fort	TLPL	UVF	Hewanorra International Airport in Vieux Fort	13°44′00″N 060°57′09″W

Note: adapted from "List of airports in Saint Lucia. (2023, November 11). In Wikipedia. List of airports in Saint Lucia#See also".

== Saint Martin (island) ==
Location served	ICAO	IATA	Airport name	Coordinates
Philipsburg, Sint Maarten	TNCM	SXM	Princess Juliana International Airport	18°02′27″N 063°06′32″W
Grand Case, Saint Martin	TFFG	SFG	L'Espérance Airport	18°06′02″N 063°02′56″W

== Saint Vincent and the Grenadines ==
Country	Location	ICAO	IATA	Airport name	Coordinates
Saint Vincent and the Grenadines	Kingstown	TVSA	SVD	Argyle International Airport	13°09′23″N 061°09′01″W
Saint Vincent and the Grenadines	Port Elizabeth	TVSB	BQU	J. F. Mitchell Airport	12°59′18″N 061°15′43″W
Saint Vincent and the Grenadines	Lovell Village	TVSM	MQS	Mustique Airport	12°53′17″N 061°10′49″W
Saint Vincent and the Grenadines	Charlestown	TVSC	CIW	Canouan Airport	12°41′57″N 061°20′33″W
Saint Vincent and the Grenadines	Clifton	TVSU	UNI	Union Island Airport	12°35′55″N 061°24′53″W

== Trinidad and Tobago ==
Country	Location	ICAO	IATA	Airport name	Coordinates
Trinidad and Tobago	Couva			Camden Base (Camden Airfield)	10°25′34″N 61°26′23″W
Trinidad and Tobago	Scarborough	TTCP	TAB	Arthur Napoleon Raymond Robinson International Airport	11°08′58″N 60°49′56″W
Trinidad and Tobago	Port of Spain	TTPP	POS	Piarco International Airport	10°35′44″N 61°20′14″W

== Comparisons ==
- List of Airport Service Quality Award winners § Latin America & Caribbean
- List of largest airlines in Central America & the Caribbean
- List of accidents and incidents involving airliners by location
- List of the busiest airports in the Caribbean
- World's busiest airports by passenger traffic
- List of busiest airports in Latin America by passenger traffic
- List of the busiest airports in Central America
- List of the busiest airports in the Nordic countries
- List of the busiest airports in Europe
- World's busiest airports by cargo traffic

== See also ==
- Airports Council International – Latin America-Caribbean, industry group
- Lists of airports
