= List of airports in Cuba =

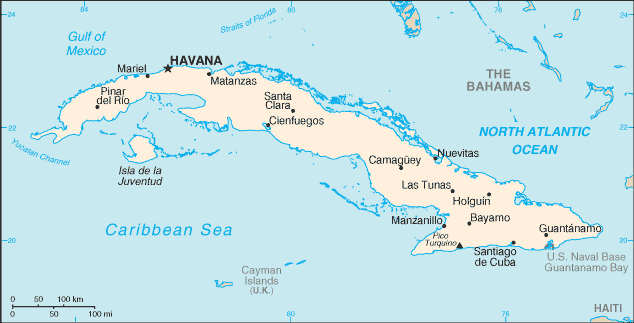
Map of Cuba

This is a list of airports in Cuba, grouped by type and sorted by location.

Cuba, officially the Republic of Cuba, is an island country in the Caribbean. It is an archipelago of islands located in the northern Caribbean Sea at the confluence with the Gulf of Mexico and the Atlantic Ocean. The United States lies to the northwest, the Bahamas to the north, Haiti to the east, Jamaica and the Cayman Islands to the south, and Mexico to the west. The country is subdivided into 15 provinces and one special municipality (Isla de la Juventud, the country's second largest island). Cuba's capital and largest city is Havana.

== Airports ==
Airport names shown in bold have scheduled passenger service on commercial airlines.

Location served	Province	ICAO	IATA	Airport name	Coordinates
**Public airports**
Baracoa	Guantánamo	MUBA	BCA	Gustavo Rizo Airport	20°21′55″N 074°30′22″W
Bayamo	Granma	MUBY	BYM	Carlos Manuel de Céspedes Airport	20°23′47″N 076°37′17″W
Camagüey	Camagüey	MUCM	CMW	**Ignacio Agramonte International Airport**	21°25′13″N 077°50′51″W
Cayo Coco	Ciego de Ávila	MUCC	CCC	**Jardines del Rey Airport**	22°27′40″N 078°19′43″W
Cayo Largo del Sur	Isla de la Juventud	MUCL	CYO	**Vilo Acuña Airport** (Juan Vitalio Acuña Airport)	21°36′58″N 81°32′44″W
Cayo Santa Maria	Villa Clara	MUBR	BWW	Las Brujas Airport	22°37′16″N 079°08′50″W
Ciego de Ávila	Ciego de Ávila	MUCA	AVI	Máximo Gómez Airport	22°01′37″N 078°47′22″W
Cienfuegos	Cienfuegos	MUCF	CFG	Jaime González Airport	22°09′00″N 080°23′51″W
Florida	Camagüey	MUFL		Florida Airport	21°29′59″N 078°12′10″W
Guantánamo	Guantánamo	MUGT	GAO	Mariana Grajales Airport	20°05′07″N 075°09′29″W
Guardalavaca	Holguín	MUGV		Guardalavaca Airport	21°06′40″N 75°49′20″W
Havana	Havana	MUHA	HAV	**José Martí International Airport**	22°59′21″N 082°24′33″W
Havana	Artemisa	MUPB	UPB	Playa Baracoa Airport	23°01′58″N 082°34′46″W
Holguín	Holguín	MUHG	HOG	**Frank País Airport**	20°46′44″N 076°18′44″W
Las Tunas	Las Tunas	MUVT	VTU	Hermanos Ameijeiras Airport	20°59′16″N 076°56′09″W
Manzanillo	Granma	MUMZ	MZO	Sierra Maestra Airport	20°17′20″N 077°05′12″W
Moa	Holguín	MUMO	MOA	Orestes Acosta Airport	20°39′14″N 74°55′20″W
Nueva Gerona	Isla de la Juventud	MUNG	GER	**Rafael Cabrera Mustelier Airport**	21°50′05″N 082°47′02″W
Nueva Gerona	Isla de la Juventud	MUSN	SZJ	Siguanea Airport	21°38′33″N 082°57′18″W
Pinar del Río	Pinar del Río	MULM	LCL	La Coloma Airport	22°20′11″N 083°38′32″W
Punta de Maisí	Guantánamo	MUMA	UMA	Punta de Maisí Airport	20°14′35″N 74°08′50″W
San Nicolás de Bari	Mayabeque	MUNB	QSN	San Nicolás de Bari Airport	22°45′23″N 081°55′15″W
Sancti Spíritus	Sancti Spíritus	MUSS	USS	Sancti Spíritus Airport	21°58′12″N 079°26′34″W
Santa Clara	Villa Clara	MUSC	SNU	**Abel Santamaría Airport**	22°29′32″N 079°56′37″W
Santa Lucía	Camagüey	MUSL		Joaquín de Agüero Airport (Santa Lucia Airport)	21°30′34″N 077°01′13″W
Santiago de Cuba	Santiago de Cuba	MUCU	SCU	**Antonio Maceo Airport**	19°58′12″N 075°50′08″W
Trinidad	Sancti Spíritus	MUTD	TND	Alberto Delgado Airport	21°47′18″N 79°59′50″W
Varadero	Matanzas	MUVR	VRA	**Juan Gualberto Gómez Airport**	23°02′04″N 81°26′07″W
Varadero	Matanzas	MUKW		Kawama Airport	23°07′25″N 081°18′07″W
**Military airports**
Guantánamo Bay	Guantánamo	MUGM	NBW	Leeward Point Field (Naval Station Guantanamo Bay)	19°54′23″N 075°12′25″W
Havana	Havana	MUMG		Managua Airport	22°58′12″N 82°16′30″W
Havana	Havana	MULB		Ciudad Libertad Airport	23°05′38″N 082°26′17″W
Pinar del Río	Pinar del Río	MUSJ	SNJ	San Julian Air Base	22°05′43″N 084°09′07″W
San Antonio de los Baños	Artemisa	MUSA		San Antonio de los Baños Air Base	22°52′18″N 082°30′34″W
**Closed airports**
Caibarién	Villa Clara	MUCB		Caibarién Airport (abandoned)	
Cayo Coco	Ciego de Ávila	MUOC		Cayo Coco Airport (abandoned)	
Mariel	Artemisa	MUML		Mariel Airport (abolished)	
Mayajigua	Sancti Spiritus		MJG	Mayajigua Airport (abandoned)	
Nicaro	Holguín	MUNC	ICR	Nicaro Airport (abandoned)	
Pinar del Río	Pinar del Río	MUPR	QPD	Pinar del Río Airport (abandoned)	22°25′17″N 083°40′42″W
Preston	Holguín		PST	Preston Airport (abandoned)	

== See also ==
- Transport in Cuba
- Cuban Revolutionary Armed Forces
- List of airports in the Caribbean
- List of airports by ICAO code: M#MU - Cuba
- Wikipedia: WikiProject Aviation/Airline destination lists: North America#Cuba
