= List of Cubana de Aviación destinations =

This is a list of destinations served by Cubana de Aviación:

== List ==
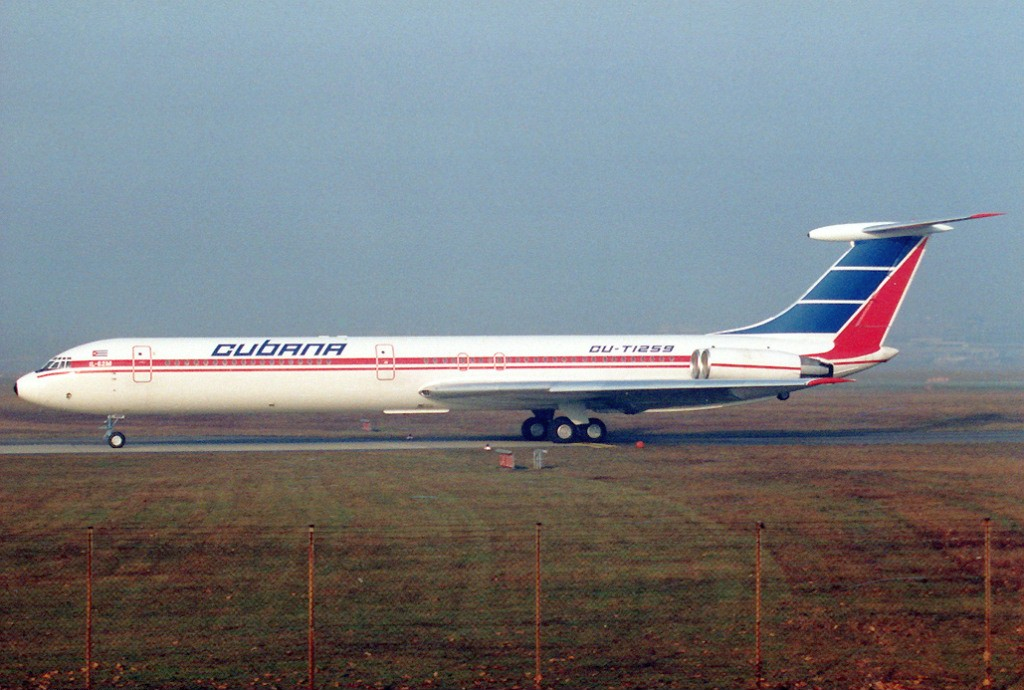
A Cubana de Aviación Ilyushin Il-62M at Frankfurt Airport in 1992. Frankfurt is a current destination for the airline.

Country	City	Airport	Notes	Refs
Angola	Luanda	Quatro de Fevereiro Airport	Terminated	
Argentina	Buenos Aires	Ministro Pistarini International Airport	Terminated	
Argentina	Mendoza	Governor Francisco Gabrielli International Airport	Terminated	
Austria	Vienna	Vienna International Airport	Terminated	
Bahamas	Nassau	Lynden Pindling International Airport	Terminated	
Barbados	Bridgetown	Grantley Adams International Airport	Terminated	
Belgium	Brussels	Brussels Airport	Terminated	
Brazil	Rio de Janeiro	Rio de Janeiro/Galeão International Airport	Terminated	
Brazil	São Paulo	São Paulo/Guarulhos International Airport	Terminated	
Canada	Montreal	Montréal–Trudeau International Airport		
Canada	Toronto	Toronto Pearson International Airport		
Cape Verde	Sal	Amílcar Cabral International Airport	Terminated	
Chile	Santiago	Arturo Merino Benítez International Airport	Terminated	
Colombia	Bogotá	El Dorado International Airport		
Costa Rica	San José	Juan Santamaría International Airport		
Cuba	Baracoa	Gustavo Rizo Airport	Terminated	
Cuba	Bayamo	Carlos Manuel de Céspedes Airport	Terminated	
Cuba	Camagüey	Ignacio Agramonte International Airport	Terminated	
Cuba	Cayo Coco	Jardines del Rey Airport		
Cuba	Cayo Largo	Vilo Acuña Airport		
Cuba	Ciego de Ávila	Máximo Gómez Airport	Terminated	
Cuba	Cienfuegos	Jaime González Airport		
Cuba	Guantánamo	Mariana Grajales Airport		
Cuba	Havana	José Martí International Airport	Hub	
Cuba	Holguín	Frank País Airport	Terminated	
Cuba	Las Tunas	Hermanos Ameijeiras Airport	Terminated	
Cuba	Manzanillo	Sierra Maestra Airport	Terminated	
Cuba	Moa	Orestes Acosta Airport	Terminated	
Cuba	Nueva Gerona	Rafael Perez Airport		
Cuba	Santa Clara	Abel Santa María Airport		
Cuba	Santiago de Cuba	Antonio Maceo Airport	Focus city	
Cuba	Varadero	Juan Gualberto Gómez Airport	Focus city	
Czech Republic	Prague	Václav Havel Airport Prague	Terminated	
Dominican Republic	Santo Domingo	Las Américas International Airport	Suspended	
Ecuador	Guayaquil	José Joaquín de Olmedo International Airport	Terminated	
Ecuador	Quito	Mariscal Sucre International Airport	Terminated	
France	Paris	Orly Airport		
Germany	Berlin	Berlin Schönefeld Airport	Terminated	
Germany	Frankfurt	Frankfurt Airport		
Guadeloupe	Pointe-à-Pitre	Pointe-à-Pitre International Airport	Suspended	
Guatemala	Guatemala City	La Aurora International Airport	Terminated	
Guinea-Bissau	Bissau	Osvaldo Vieira International Airport	Terminated	
Guyana	Georgetown	Cheddi Jagan International Airport	Terminated	
Haiti	Port-au-Prince	Toussaint Louverture International Airport	Suspended	
Italy	Milan	Milan Malpensa Airport	Terminated	
Italy	Rome	Leonardo da Vinci–Fiumicino Airport	Terminated	
Jamaica	Kingston	Norman Manley International Airport	Terminated	
Martinique	Fort-de-France	Martinique Aimé Césaire International Airport	Suspended	
Mexico	Cancún	Cancún International Airport	Terminated	
Mexico	Mexico City	Mexico City International Airport		
Mozambique	Maputo	Maputo International Airport	Terminated	
Nicaragua	Managua	Augusto C. Sandino International Airport	Terminated	
Panama	Panama City	Tocumen International Airport	Terminated	
Peru	Lima	Jorge Chávez International Airport	Terminated	
Portugal	Lisbon	Lisbon Airport	Terminated	
Russia	Moscow	Sheremetyevo International Airport	Terminated	
Spain	Barcelona	Josep Tarradellas Barcelona–El Prat Airport	Terminated	
Spain	Madrid	Madrid–Barajas Airport		
Spain	Santiago de Compostela	Santiago de Compostela Airport	Terminated	
Spain	Vitoria	Vitoria Airport	Terminated	
Switzerland; France; Germany	Basel; Mulhouse; Freiburg	EuroAirport Basel Mulhouse Freiburg	Terminated	
United Kingdom	London	Gatwick Airport	Terminated	
United Kingdom	London	London Stansted Airport	Terminated	
United States	New York City	John F. Kennedy International Airport	Terminated	
Uruguay	Montevideo	Carrasco International Airport	Terminated	
Venezuela	Caracas	Simón Bolívar International Airport		
