= Varadero Airport =

Varadero Airport may refer to the following airports in Varadero, Matanzas Province, Cuba:

- Juan Gualberto Gómez Airport, formerly known as Varadero Airport
- Kawama Airport, an airport serving Varadero
