= SZJ =

SZJ can refer to:

- Party for Life Security (Czech: Strana za životní jistoty), political party in the Czech Republic (1989–2005)
- Shuozhou, prefecture-level city in Shanxi, China (administrative division code SZJ)
- Siguanea Airport, Isla de la Juventud, Cuba (IATA code: SZJ)
- Slovenian Sign Language (Slovene: Slovenski znakovni jezik)
