= Managua (disambiguation) =

Managua is the capital city of Nicaragua.

Managua may also refer to:

== Places ==
- Lake Managua, also known as Lake Xolotlán, a lake in Nicaragua
- Managua (department), a department in Nicaragua
- Managua International Airport, the main airport near the city
- Quepos Managua Airport, an airport in Costa Rica
- Managua, a community in Cuba south of Havana
- Managua Airport (Cuba), a military airport near Havana, Cuba

== Others ==
- "Managua, Nicaragua" (song), a popular song in the 1940s sung by Guy Lombardo
- América Managua, a Nicaraguan football team
- Viva Managua Movement, a Nicaraguan political organisation
- Managua (film), a 1996 film starring Louis Gossett Jr.
