= La Coloma =

- Village
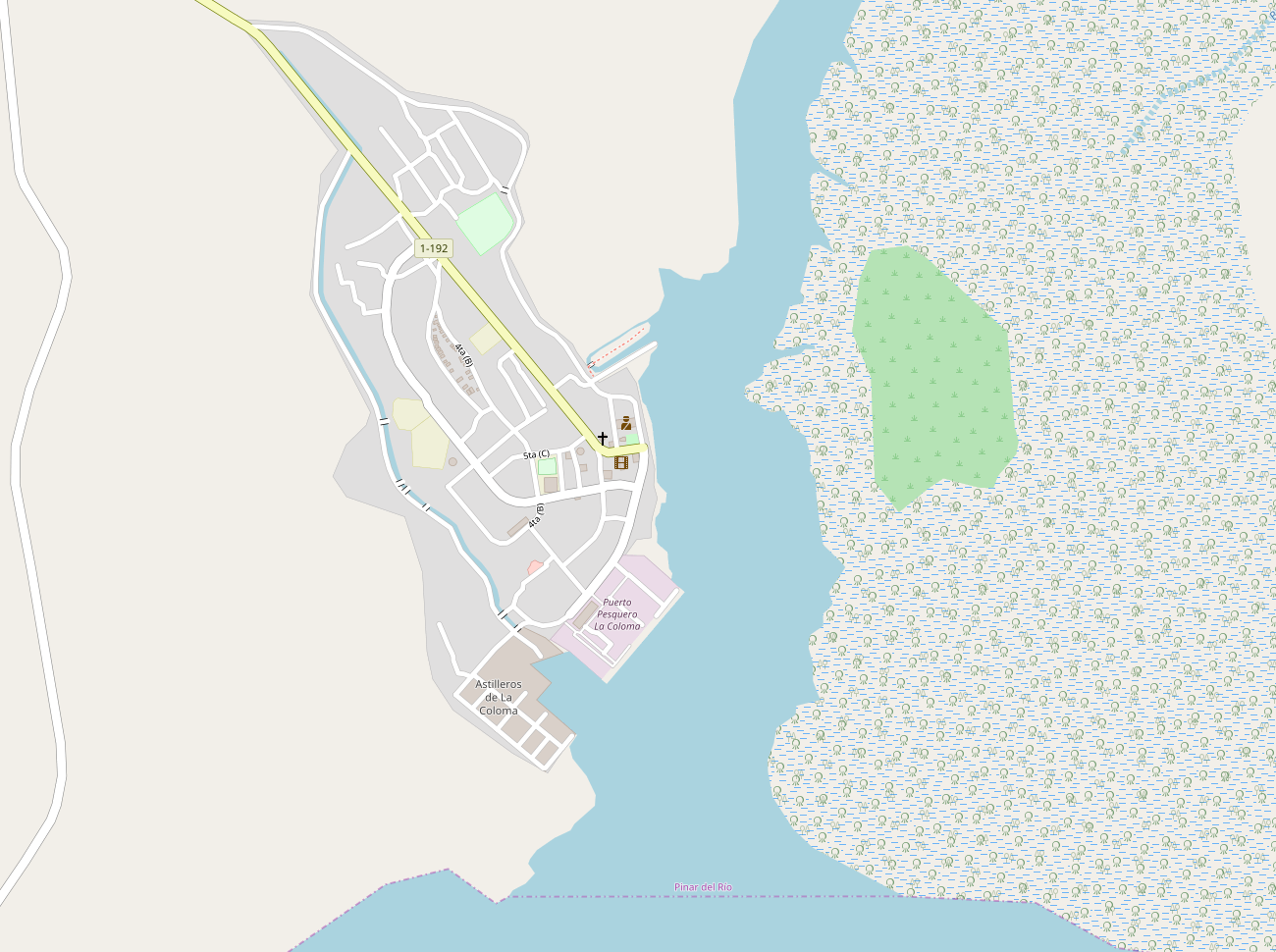
- OSM map showing La Coloma

- Location of La Coloma in Cuba
- Coordinates: 22°14′28.6″N 83°34′24.1″W
- Country: Cuba
- Province: Pinar del Río
- Municipality: Pinar del Río
- Founded: 1607
- Elevation: 10 m (33 ft)

Population (2011)
  - Total: 7,000
- Time zone: UTC-5 (EST)
- Area code: +53-48

La Coloma is a Cuban village and consejo popular ("people's council", i.e. hamlet) of the municipality of Pinar del Río, in Pinar del Río Province. In 2011 it had a population of about 7,000.

== History ==
The settlement, founded in 1607 and used by the Spanish Empire as a shipyard, due to its natural harbor, was known as Partido San Rosendo until April 30, 1840, when it took the current name. Originally part of the municipality of San Luis, La Coloma passed under the adjacent administration of Pinar del Río in 1977, following the Cuban administrative reform. Prior to that, in the early 1900s, Spaniards began immigrating to Cuba, with some, mostly Galicians, settling in La Coloma. In the 1930s, during the Great Depression, the village suffered from extreme poverty. Later, at the height of the Cuban Revolution, La Coloma served as a strategic location of the 26th of July Movement and was used to smuggle in weapons to aid in the fight against Fulgencio Batista, as well as other acts of sabotage to weaken the efforts of rural guards. This culminated in the takeover and occupation of its Military Naval Port by village residents on January 1, 1959. Today, La Coloma’s main economic driver is the industrial fishing complex building.

== Geography ==
La Coloma is located on the Gulf of Batabanó, by the Caribbean Coast and the western shore of La Coloma River mouth, in front of Cayos de San Felipe _{(fr)}. Among the western Caribbean coast, from Cape San Antonio until Surgidero de Batabanó, in Mayabeque Province, is one of the very few settlements and the largest one.

The village lies 24 km south of Pinar del Río, 21 from San Luis, 32 from San Juan y Martínez, 48 from Consolación del Sur, 52 from Viñales and 83 from Sandino. Playa las Canas, a small village and beach, lies few km west of La Coloma's port.

== Economy ==
The main economic activity of La Coloma is the fishing industry. The Combinado Pesquero Industrial La Coloma complex, built in 1976, is located by the port.

The administration of the biology station for the National Park Cayos de San Felipe (Nacional Cayos de San Felipe) is also in La Coloma.

== Transport ==
La Coloma Airport (IATA: LCL, ICAO: MULM) lies 17 km north and serves Pinar del Río, replacing the abandoned Pinar del Río Airport. The village has a seaport on the mouth of La Coloma River, mainly used for fishing activities and with some ferries to Nueva Gerona, in the Isla de la Juventud. It is the southern end of 1-192 highway, crossed by the Carretera Central highway in Pinar del Río; and is 25 km from the A4 motorway Pinar del Río-Havana.

== See also ==
- Municipalities of Cuba
- List of cities in Cuba
