= ECASA =

ECASA can be:

- the acronym of Empresa Cubana de Aeropuertos y Servicios Aeronáuticos, the airport management company of Cuba
- an abbreviation for enteric-coated acetylsalicylic acid
