= Arroyo Naranjo =

Distrito de Arroyo Naranjo
- District of Havana
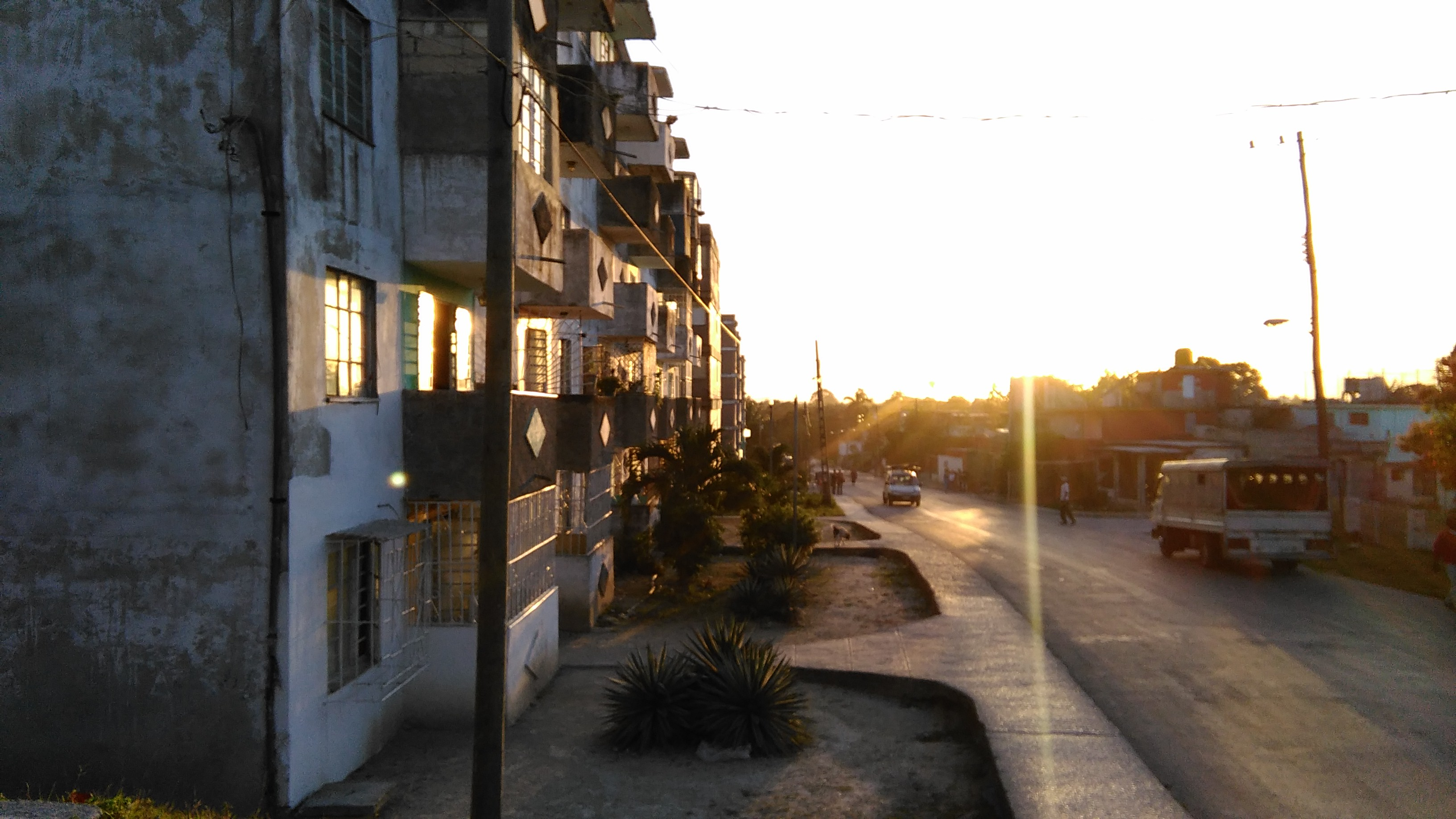

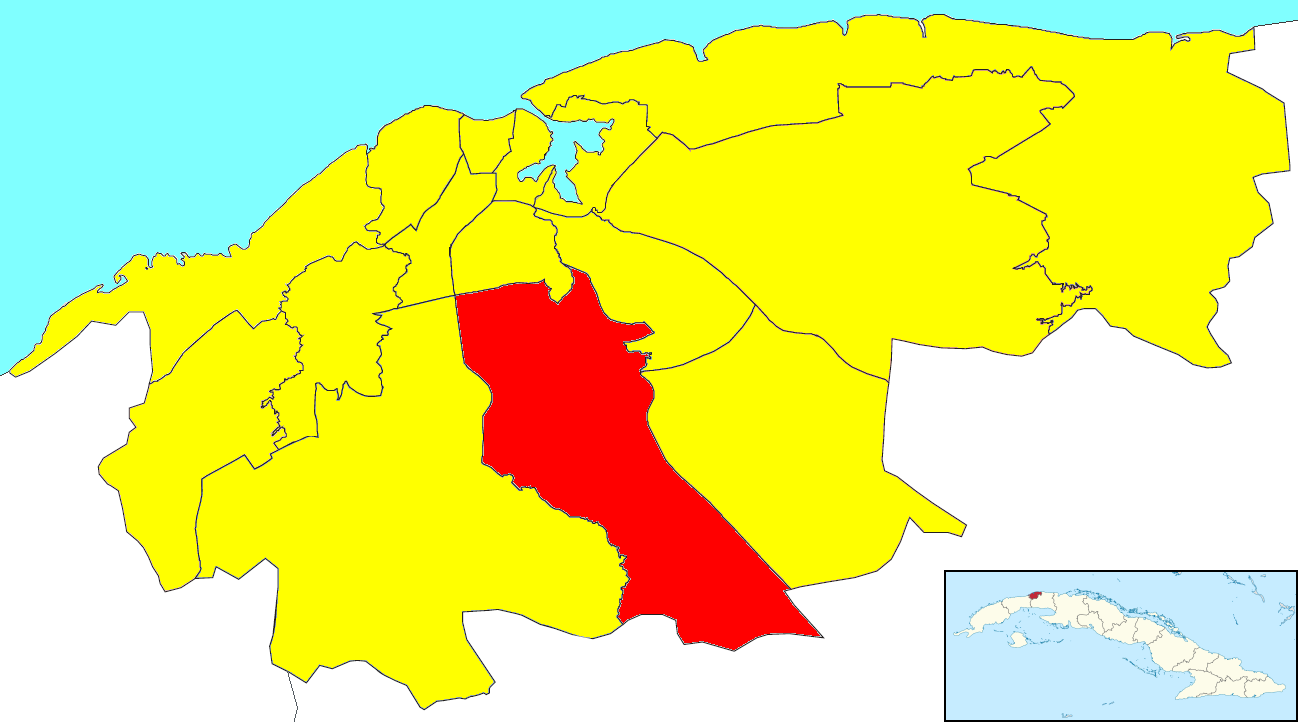
- Location of Arroyo Naranjo in Havana
- Coordinates: 23°02′37″N 82°19′58″W
- Country: Cuba
- Province: Ciudad de La Habana
- Wards (Consejos Populares): Callejas, Calvario-Fraternidad, Eléctrico, Guinera, Los Pinos, Managua, Mantilla, Párraga, Poey, Víbora Park

Area
  - Total: 83 km^{2} (32 sq mi)
- Elevation: 85 m (279 ft)

Population (2022)
  - Total: 206,918
  - Density: 2,500/km^{2} (6,500/sq mi)
- Time zone: UTC-5 (EST)
- Area code: +53-7

Arroyo Naranjo is one of the 15 municipalities or boroughs (municipios in Spanish) in the city of Havana, Cuba. It became part of Havana city while the capital grew.

The Managua Military Airport is located in the southern part of this municipality.

== History ==
The borough was founded in 1845, and by 1848 its party was created. Arroyo Naranjo is situated 11 kilometers (6.8 mi) south of Old Havana on the Havana-Las Vegas highway, having been a stop of buses that were doing the service between these two cities. In 1858 Arroyo Naranjo had 291 inhabitants, who were increasing in the period of the baths, for the proximity to the medicinal waters known by the Cacahual. Arroyo Naranjo had always a progressive population. From 291 inhabitants of 1858, in 1871 the town had 1,485.

In 1939, famed painter Carlos Enriquez bought a small ranch house in Arroyo Naranjo, dubbed "El Huron Azul" (the Blue Ferret), which became a meeting-place for Cuba's avant-garde artists, and is now a museum dedicated to Enriquez' work.

== Demographics ==
In 2022, the municipality of Arroyo Naranjo had a population of 206,918. With a total area of 83 km^{2} (32 sq mi), it has a population density of 2,500/km^{2} (6,500/sq mi).

== See also ==
- List of cities in Cuba
- Municipalities of Cuba
