= Pinar del Río (disambiguation) =

Pinar del Río is the capital city of Pinar del Río Province, Cuba.

Pinar del Río may also refer to:

== Sports teams ==
- FC Pinar del Río, football (soccer) club based in Pinar del Río
- Pinar del Río, a defunct baseball team of the Cuban National Series, active before 1992
- Vegueros de Pinar del Río, a baseball team in the Cuban National Series, formed in 1992

== Other uses ==
- Pinar del Río Airport, an airport in Cuba
- Pinar del Río Province, one of the provinces of Cuba
- Roman Catholic Diocese of Pinar del Río, a Catholic Diocese in Cuba
- University of Pinar del Río, a public university in Cuba
