= Yaquelin Abdala =

Cuban visual artist (born 1968)

Yaquelín Abdalá
- Born: Yaquelín Abdalá Rodríguez; September 16, 1968 (age 57); Las Tunas, Cuba
- Other names: Yakelín Abdalá Rodríguez, Jacqueline Abdalá Rodríguez
- Education: National Art Schools, ArtEZ University of the Arts (MFA)
- Occupation: Visual artist
- Known for: Painting, installation art
- Website: www.yaquelinabdala.com

Yaquelín Abdalá Rodríguez (born September 16, 1968, in Las Tunas, Cuba), also known as Yakelín Abdalá Rodríguez, is a Cuban-born mixed media artist, working within painting and installation art. She has lived in the Netherlands since 1993.

== Exhibitions ==
Abdala displayed her brightly colored "faux" paintings, at the 5th Havana Biennial (6 May to 30 June 1994). The subject of the paintings was a combination of urban and rural Cuba, their mythologies, folk tales, and contrasts, featuring Abdala's personal anecdotes and dreams. During the 7th Havana Biennial (November 2000 to January 2001) she created "We are not allone" an installation combining paintings of the female body, surrealist imagery, and photographs.

Abdala has been featured in several prominent gallery shows, including the acclaimed exhibit "Kuba Ok", which had several pieces purchased and displayed by a patron in Germany.
