= San Nicolás de Bari Municipal Museum =

Museum in Cuba

- Museo Municipal de San Nicolás de Bari
- Established: 28 January 1982
- Location: San Nicolás de Bari, Cuba

San Nicolás de Bari Municipal Museum is a museum located in 32nd street in San Nicolás de Bari, Cuba. It was established on 28 January 1982.

The museum holds collections on history, weaponry and ethnology.

== See also ==
- List of museums in Cuba
