= Canouan Airport =

Airport in St. Vincent and the Grenadines

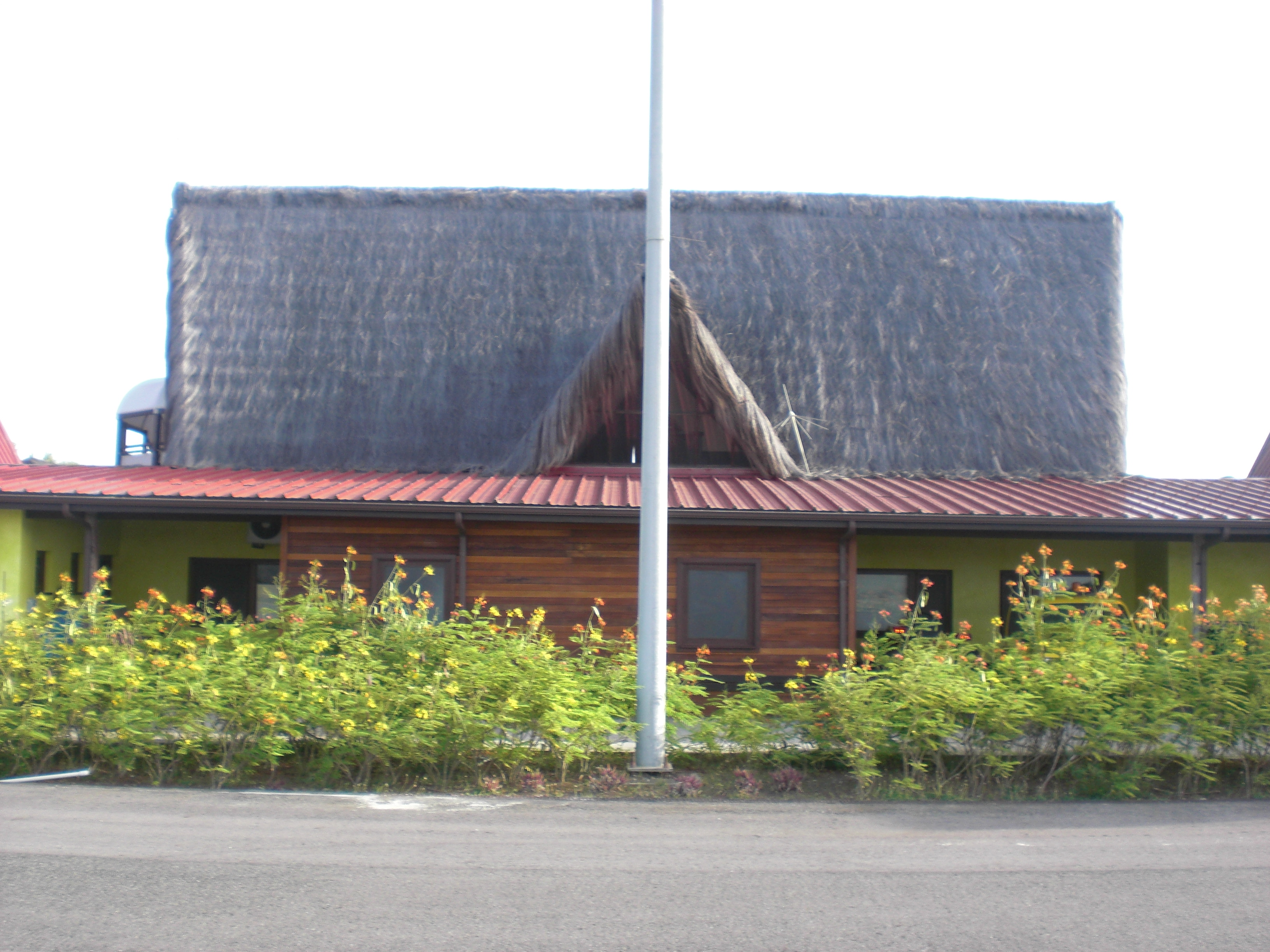
- IATA: CIW; ICAO: TVSC

Summary
- Airport type: Public
- Owner: Government of Saint Vincent and the Grenadines
- Serves: Canouan
- Location: Charlestown
- Opened: May 11, 2008
- Hub for: SVG Air
- Time zone: AST (UTC−04:00)
- Elevation AMSL: 11 ft (3.4 m)
- Coordinates: 12°41′57″N 061°20′33″W

Map
- Location in Saint Vincent and the Grenadines

Runways
Direction	Length		Surface
Direction	ft	m	Surface
13/31	5,875	1,791	Asphalt
- Source: DAFIF

Canouan Airport (IATA: CIW, ICAO: TVSC) is the airport located on the island of Canouan in St. Vincent and the Grenadines. The airport serves the surrounding tourist areas and environs of the Grenadines and is a major destination during the Caribbean winter leisure season. Aside from facilitating regular passenger flights, the airport is also open for international corporate jet operations and charter flights. Canouan Airport was the main business aviation airport in St. Vincent and the Grenadines before the opening of Argyle International Airport. The terminal has a CIP (Commercially Important People) lounge and other facilities for international passengers and a domestic hub for St. Vincent and the Grenadines. It is the second largest airport in St. Vincent and the Grenadines, after Argyle International Airport. The airport often served as the alternate airport for E.T. Joshua Airport, now a decommissioned airport in St. Vincent and other Grenadines airports.

Since the longest runway in St. Vincent and the Grenadines, at 5,875 feet (1,791 m), was located at Canouan Airport, it was the airport used to receive illegal immigrants deported from the United States by the U.S. Immigration and Customs Enforcement (ICE) Air Operations-detainee removal flights, prior to the opening of AIA.

The airport is built in traditional Grenadines style with an open-air terminal with roof covered in cane palm fronds, its wooden walls and columns made of eucalyptus logs. The terminal architecture is based on the Native indigenous people of the Caribbean Tainos and Arawak structures, giving passengers a paradise feeling. The terminal has no airbridges; walk-boarding is used on all stands and mobile stairways or the aircraft's own airstairs are used for embarking and disembarking passengers.

In the 2000s, an extensive modernization of the airport began. A land reclamation project and runway extension were completed at the end of March 2008. Overall runway length increased from 3,455 to 5,875 ft (1,053 to 1,791 m). This extension of the runway makes the airport accessible by a larger number of aircraft and can now accommodate jets such as the Boeing 737 and Airbus A320 carrying over one hundred and twenty passengers from Europe, North and South America. Before the runway extension, the ATR 72 of American Eagle (Executive Airlines) was the largest aircraft to serve the airport. In 2010 American Eagle ended daily flights from San Juan, Puerto Rico to Canouan. In addition to the runway extension, the control tower was raised some 3 m (10 ft) and the arrivals terminal was also extended to accommodate the increasing aviation services and visitors to the island. Airport apron expansion and the further development of air navigational systems were completed in 2011. It is one of only two airports in St. Vincent and the Grenadines large enough to handle large airliners. This airport was developed to meet international standards.

Canouan Airport is a small but bustling one that plays an important role in the growing economy of Canouan. Luxury tourism and real-estate contribute significantly to the island's economy and Canouan is popular with private jet travelers around the world. It is the home of some smaller general aviation businesses, including Canouan Aviation Services which operates from the general aviation area on the south-western side of the runway. Connection is maintained from the airport for several smaller airports in the Grenadines. Its size and location makes it the most important airport in the Grenadines.

It is one of five airports in the multi-island nation of St. Vincent and the Grenadines, the others being Argyle International Airport in St. Vincent, J. F. Mitchell Airport in Bequia, Mustique Airport and Union Island Airport.

SVG Air, is a national airline of St. Vincent and the Grenadines, along with Mustique Airways. SVG Air and Mustique Airways have combined to form a SVG Air/Grenadine Air Alliance, operating 17 Aircraft, with bases in St. Vincent, Antigua and Grenada. Offering visitors and residents a wider choice of International Gateways in and out of St. Vincent & the Grenadines.

== History ==
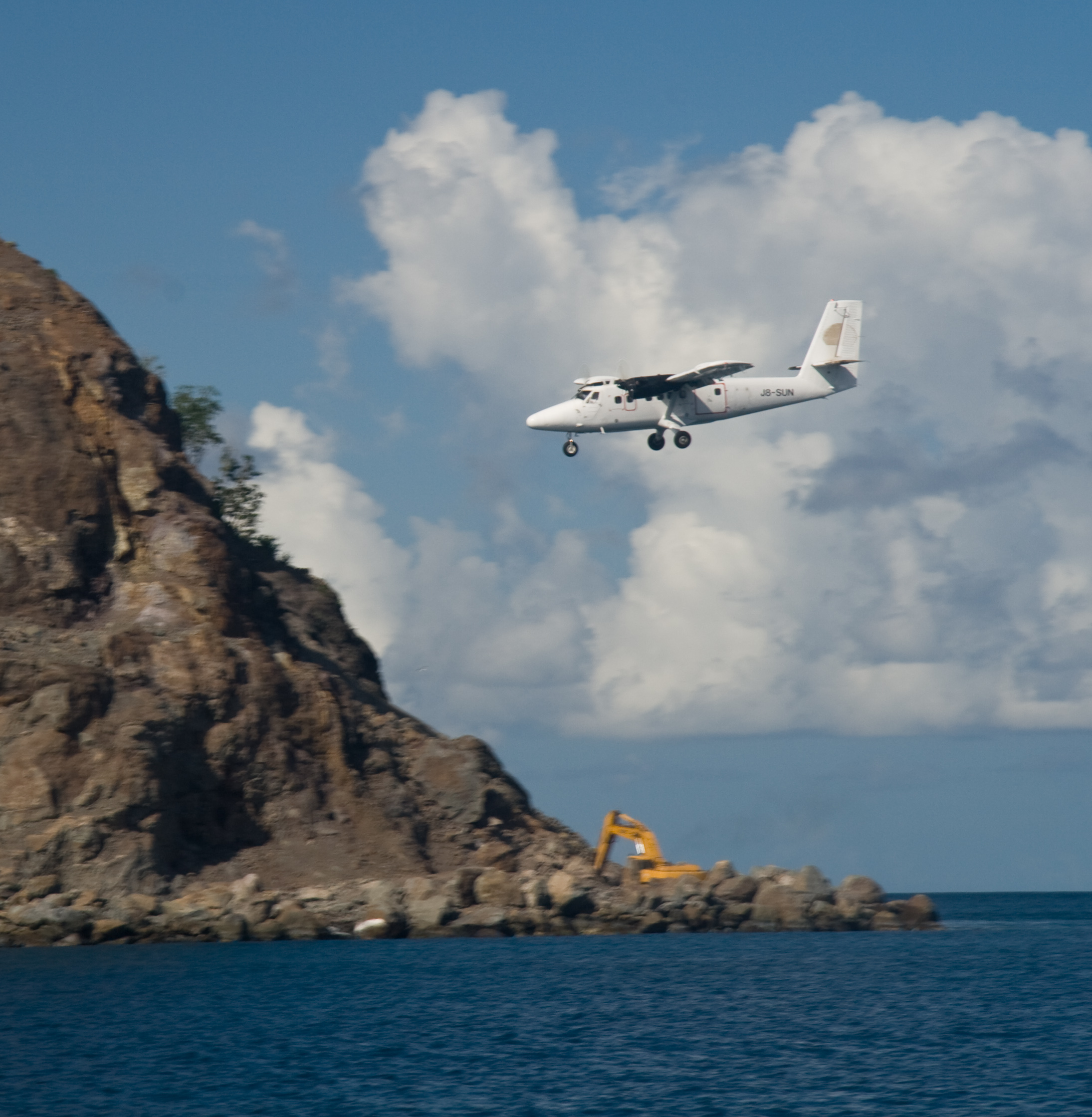
Plane Landing at Canouan

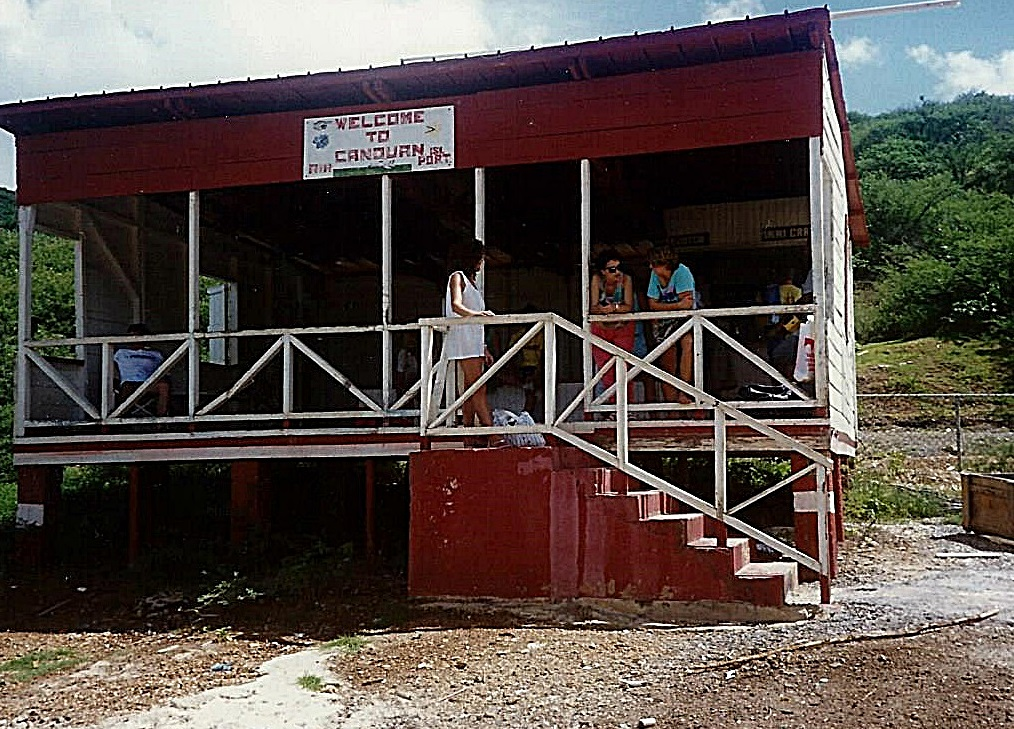
Canouan Airport's first terminal building in 1988, when the runway at the airport was an unpaved, sand and gravel airstrip.

The history of the Airport extends back to the early 1980s, when the runway at the airport was an unpaved, sand and gravel airstrip. The current airport opened in May 2008 and replaced the earlier Canouan airport with the same name and IATA code. Canouan airport was initially constructed some 20 years ago to a standard of an earth runway strip. In 1987/88 the airport was upgraded by construction of a bituminous surface dressing with a length of 1,800 ft (548 m) and a width of 60 ft (18 m).

In the following years serious deterioration caused a reduction of aircraft movements from 8,000 in 1988 to 2,000 in 1991. Since the bulk of passenger transport to and from the island is channeled through the airport, the unsatisfactory conditions on the runway and in the terminal jeopardized the economic development of Canouan. In the early 90s programs have been launched to attract tourism and to improve the island's facilities. It goes without saying that the rehabilitation and upgrading of the island's airport is an investment of first priority to the Government of Saint Vincent and the Grenadines to the future welfare of Canouan and the neighboring islands in the southern part of the country.

Based on the positive development of tourism, it was recognized in 2003 that upgrading of the runways for jet operations was essential. It was determined that land had to be reclaimed and the runway extended. In a first phase KOCKS CONSULT GMBH provided services for:

- Comprehensive field investigation and laboratory testing to determine existing pavement and subsoil condition.
- Inventories of the ecological situation.
- Topographical survey
- Collection of data and information on previous and present air traffic.
- Determination of a reference aircraft.
- Determination of the essential length of runways.
- Environmental assessment study.
- Study on economic feasibility.
- An estimation of costs.

All data and findings were compiled in the "Assessment of Principal Solutions" report. The new airport comprises an asphalt concrete runway of 1,790 m x 30 m with lighting and Precision Approach Path Indicator (PAPI), a taxiway and apron as well as a terminal, fire station and service buildings.

In 2011, Sewells Paving completed the paving of an eight and a half acre addition to the Canouan International Airport. The expansion to the airport apron was for additional airplane parking. The apron was built and paved to stand the load of a Boeing 737 jet.

In January 2019, the Ministry of Transport and Works (MTW) in St. Vincent and the Grenadines invited tenders for consulting services. The objective of the consulting services is to prepare a climate risk and vulnerability assessment, feasibility studies, preliminary and detailed designs, cost estimates and tender documents for the rehabilitation and upgrading of the runway and other pavements at Canouan Airport, together with drainage, fencing and any other infrastructural, institutional or other improvements required to ensure the sustainable operation of Canouan Airport.

== Overview ==
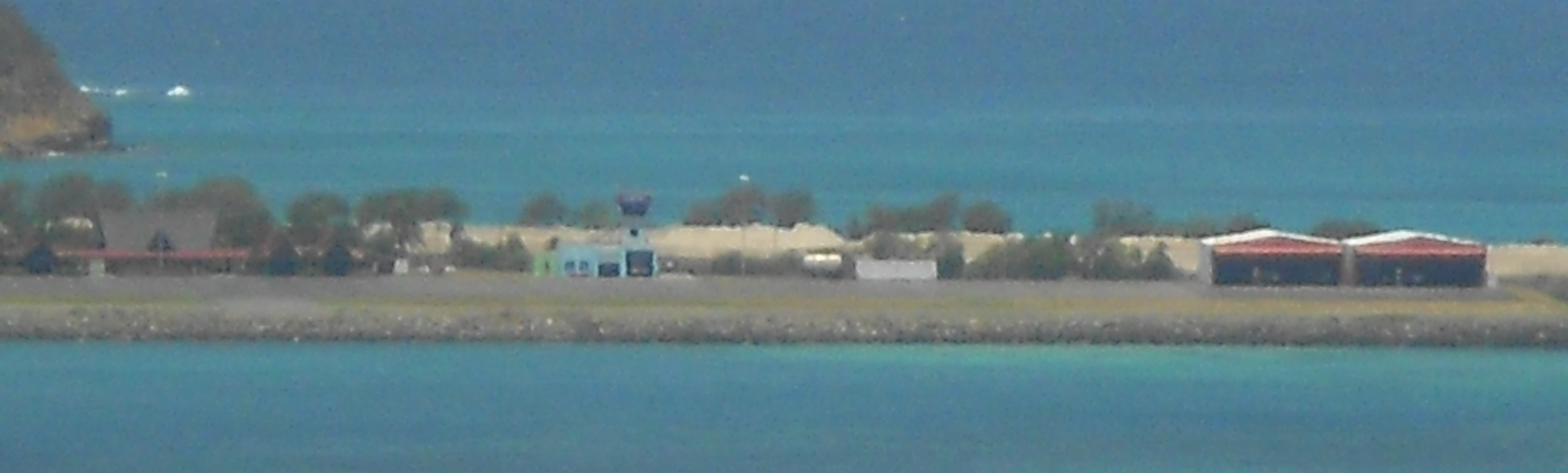
A Panoramic View of Canouan Airport from across the bay

Since Canouan Airport is accessible for virtually all private jets without payload restrictions, it is now the jetport of the Grenadines. The airport has frequent business aviation, private aviation and charter operations. It is a frequent stopping point for private pilots. During peak season sometimes 18 private jets could be seen on the apron on a given day, some arriving from as far afield as London on direct flights. There is virtually no private jet that can't land here now. The airport handles turboprop, short-haul regional airliners and narrow-body jet aircraft movements and is equipped with the necessary lights to have night air traffic. Air traffic peaks during the winter season, between November and April.

Canouan Airport is well equipped to handle private jets with minimum departure and arrival delays, while hosting over 123 private jets at the airport in December. The airport is moderately busy with mostly private jet traffic. However, the airport does offer scheduled passenger service. While Canouan Airport's main activity is general aviation, it is still a commercial airport, handling domestic and international commercial flights. Two locally owned Fixed-base operators based at the jetport facilities, Canouan Aviation Services and Vincy Aviation Services, supply fuel, hangar space and other services to inbound and outbound passengers and operators.

For those arriving with their own private jet and wishing to stay at the exclusive resorts on Mustique, Palm Island or Petit St. Vincent (PSV), their respective staff will make arrangements for your jet to be accommodated at Canouan Island Airport along with a Twin Otter Aircraft exclusive air taxi transfer or private boat transfer from Canouan to your respective exclusive hideaway.

This 3.5 square mile island positions itself as “the ultimate luxury destination of the Caribbean.” Canouan was one of the locations of the Sports Illustrated 2009 Swimsuit Edition.

Achievements of this magnitude would have been impossible to imagine twenty years ago. As recently as 1960, Canouan Island had zero infrastructures. The population was enduring blatantly impoverished conditions. They did not have a single jetty, airport or road and the only car belonged to the one policeman. There was no power source, clean drinking water, telephones, in-door plumbing, schools or doctor and only a primitive ferry system. Their sole source of income was from the sea.

== Facilities ==
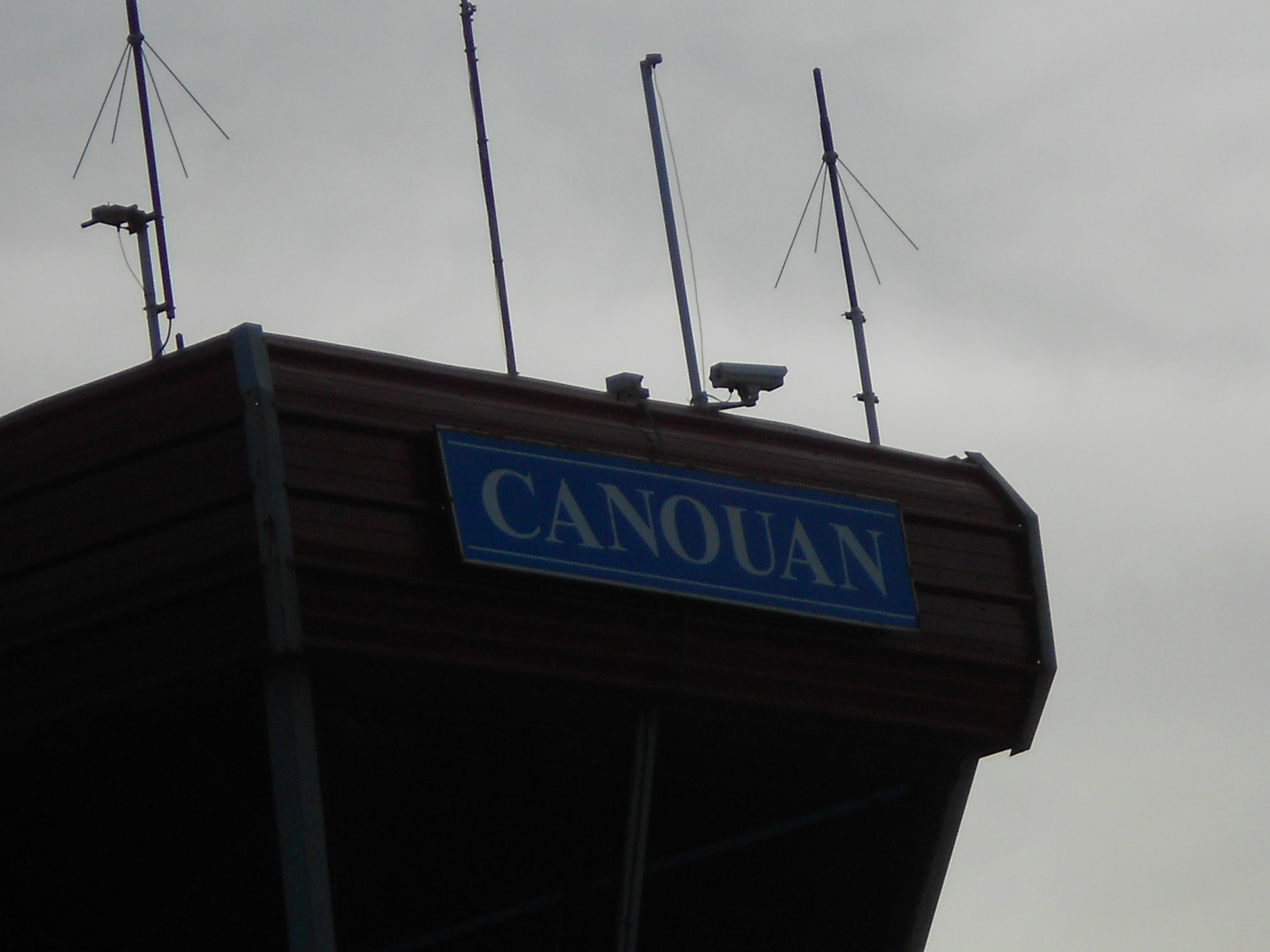
Canouan air traffic control tower

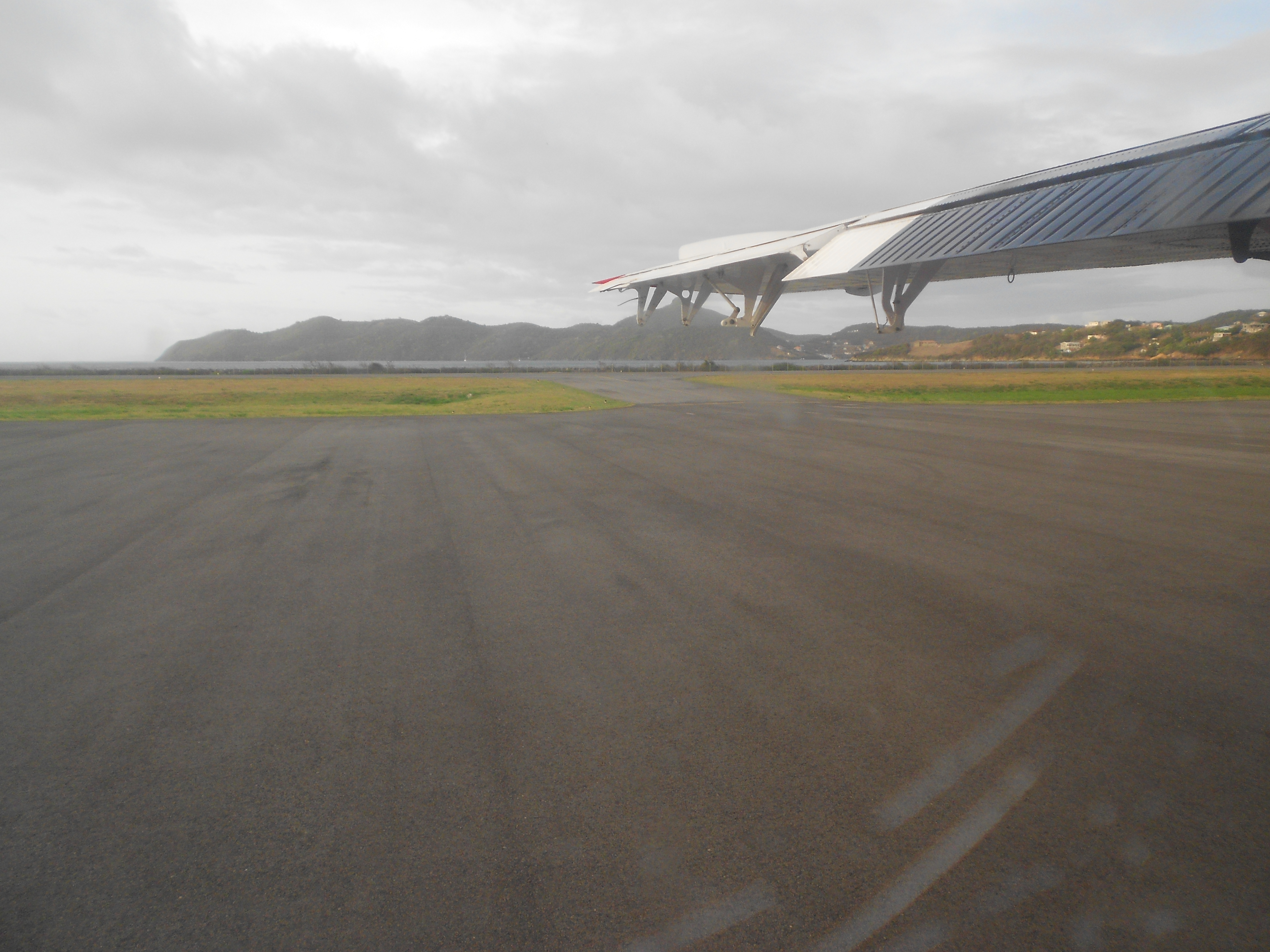
Leaving Canouan, apron view

Canouan Airport features one single small passenger terminal building with basic facilities such as check-in-facilities as well as some shops and a restaurant and a covered observation deck. The airport terminal has immigration facilities for international flights but no international transfer area.

The airport resides at an elevation of 11 ft (3.4 m) above mean sea level. It has one runway designated 13/31 with an asphalt surface measuring 1,791 m × 30 m (5,876 ft × 98 ft). Only Runway 13 offers PAPI. Runway 31 is usable under visual flight rules only. The runway is on the southwestern end of Canouan and parallels the south shoreline. Approaches and departures are over the water. The length of the main runway dictates that the airport cannot handle large wide-bodied aircraft.

The airport has also just commissioned NDB/DME navigation equipment to complement the runway extension and has equipment to support instrument approaches for all-weather operation and illumination in both directions. Navaids, Meteorological System (AWOS) and Runway Lighting designed and installed by Aeronav. All systems were commissioned in compliance with ICAO and FAA recommendations. A strong crosswind from the northeast sector is common especially between December and March. The airport is in operation at day and night.

Canouan Airport falls under category six (6) of the Aerodrome Category (ICAO Index). The airport has its own fire brigade, equipped with a fire engine suited to the present operations.

== Airlines and destinations ==
As of 2025, the airport only serve domestic flights.

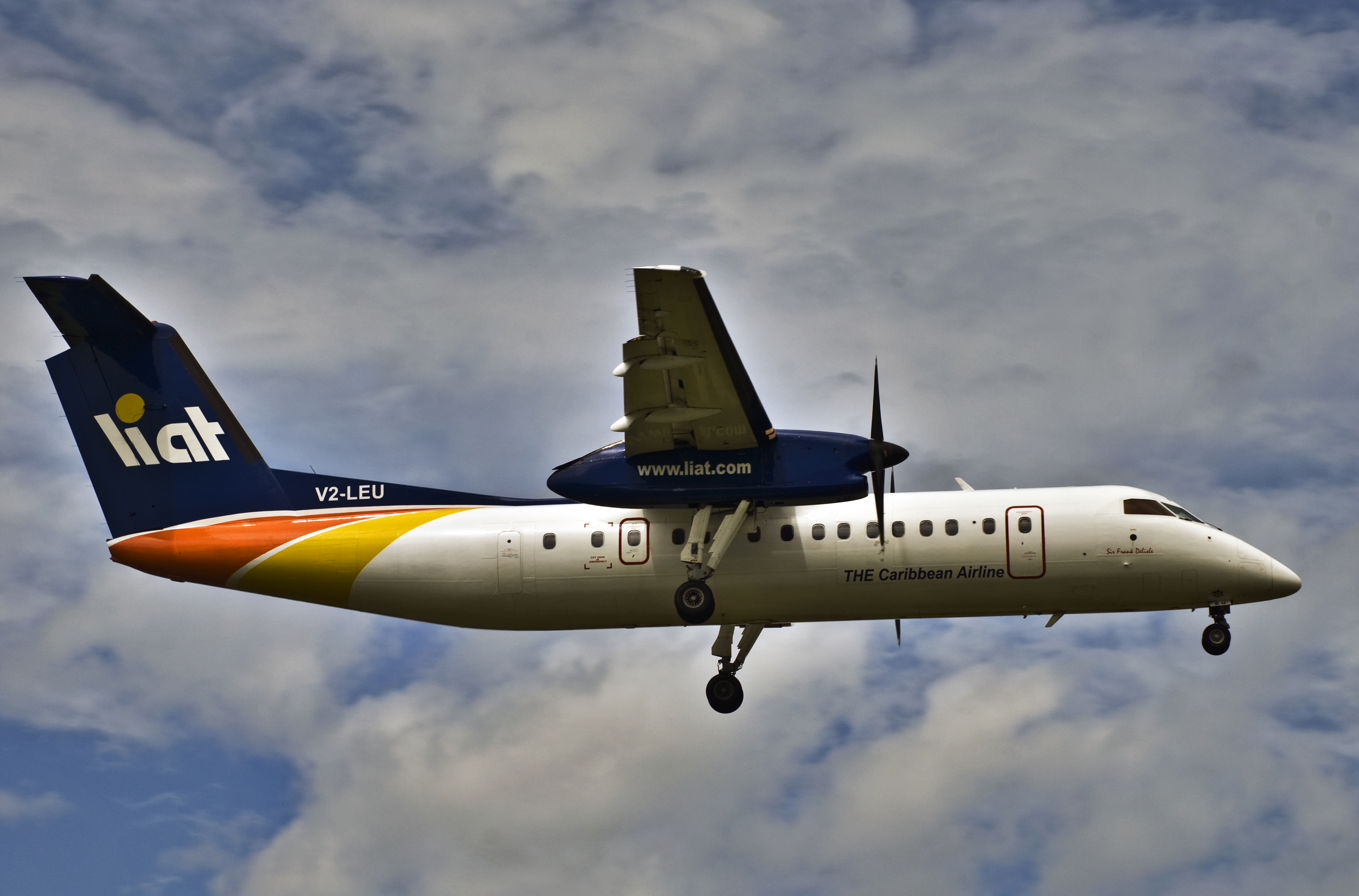
LIAT's Dash 8-300

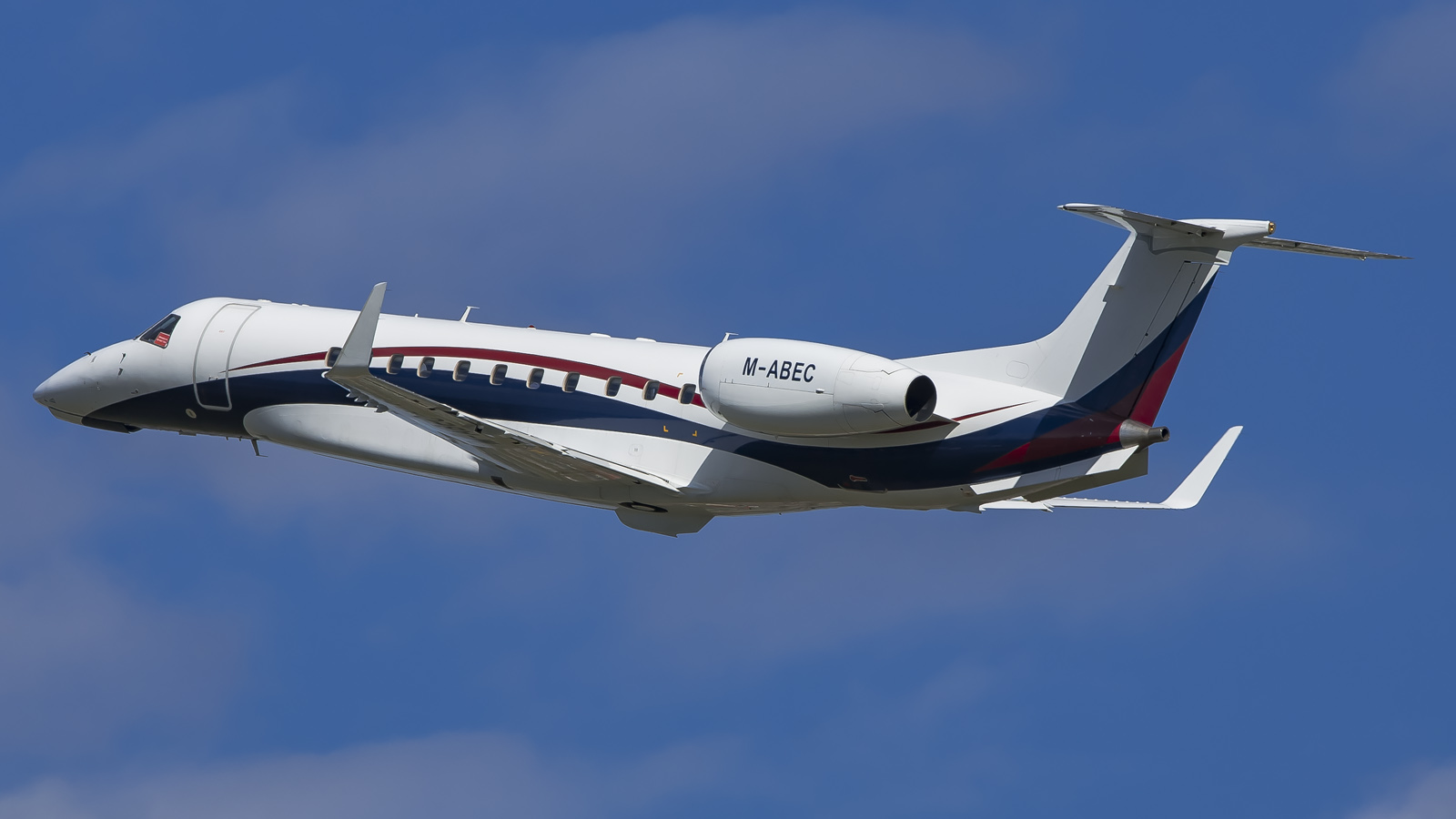
Embraer ERJ-135BJ Legacy 650

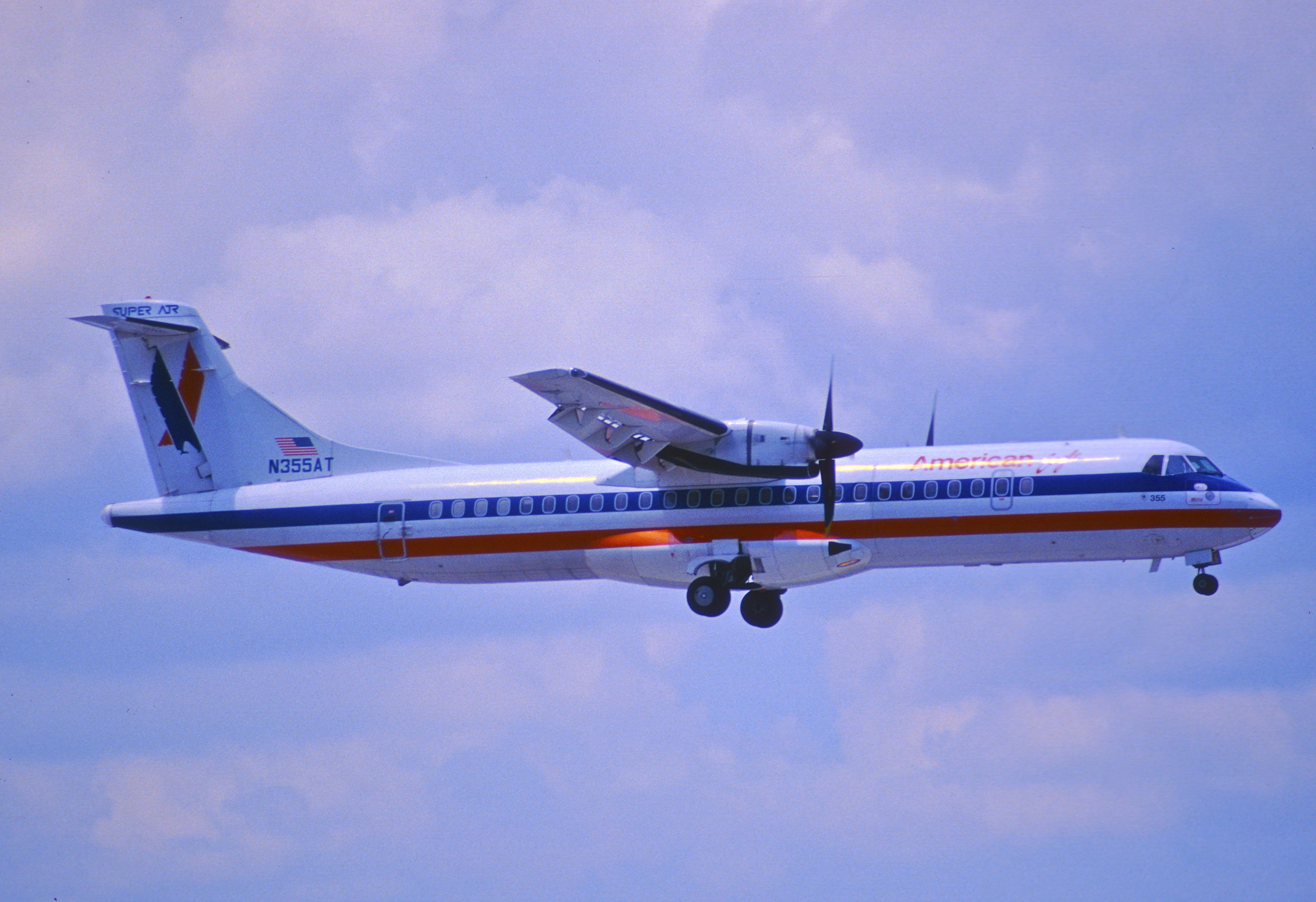
American Eagle ATR 72

Airlines	Destinations	Refs
Grenadine Airways	Charter: Bequia, Saint Vincent-Argyle, Union Island	
Mustique Airways	Bequia, Mustique, Saint Vincent–Argyle, Union Island	
One Caribbean	Charter: Bequia, Saint Vincent-Argyle	
SVG Air	Saint Lucia–Hewanorra, Saint Vincent–Argyle; Charter: Bequia, Union Island	

== Notable flights ==
In October 2013, a McDonnell Douglas MD-83 landed at the airport carrying the FIFA World Cup Trophy Tour.

In March 2022, an Airbus A320 landed at the airport after a non-stop flight from Miami International Airport becoming the largest aircraft ever to use the airport as part of a private tour to visit the Soho House (club) on the Island.

== Other facilities ==
- SVG Air aircraft maintenance hangars are on the airport property, for personal private jets and charter aircraft, along with passenger facilities and maintenance services for them.
- Canouan Aviation Services own and operate the Fuel Farm in Canouan Airport, providing unleaded kerosene Jet A-1 aviation fuel. Ground power is also available.
- General Aviation Services

== Incidents and accidents ==
- 19 November 2006 – SVG Air Aero Commander 500S, on a flight from Canouan to Saint Vincent, was over the western end of Bequia on its final approach to Saint Vincent when it vanished. There was no distress call. Wreckage was found in the sea. The pilot and single passenger are presumed dead.
- 5 August 2010 – SVG Aircraft on a flight from Saint Vincent to Canouan crashed off Canouan with only the pilot on board - not found.
- 5 March 2011 – Beechcraft 200 Super King Air aircraft operated by Wyngs Aviation landed with a tailwind and overran the runway. The aircraft had a collapsed nose wheel and badly damaged propeller blades. No reports of injuries. The plane was heading to Canouan from Porlamar Airport, Venezuela, when the pilot mistook Union Island for the neighboring island.

== See also ==
- Canouan
- Grenadine Islands
- List of airports in Saint Vincent and the Grenadines
- List of airports in the Caribbean
- Transport in Saint Vincent and the Grenadines
- List of airlines of Saint Vincent and the Grenadines
