= Cayo Coco Airport =

Defunct airport in Cayo Coco, Cuba

Cayo Coco
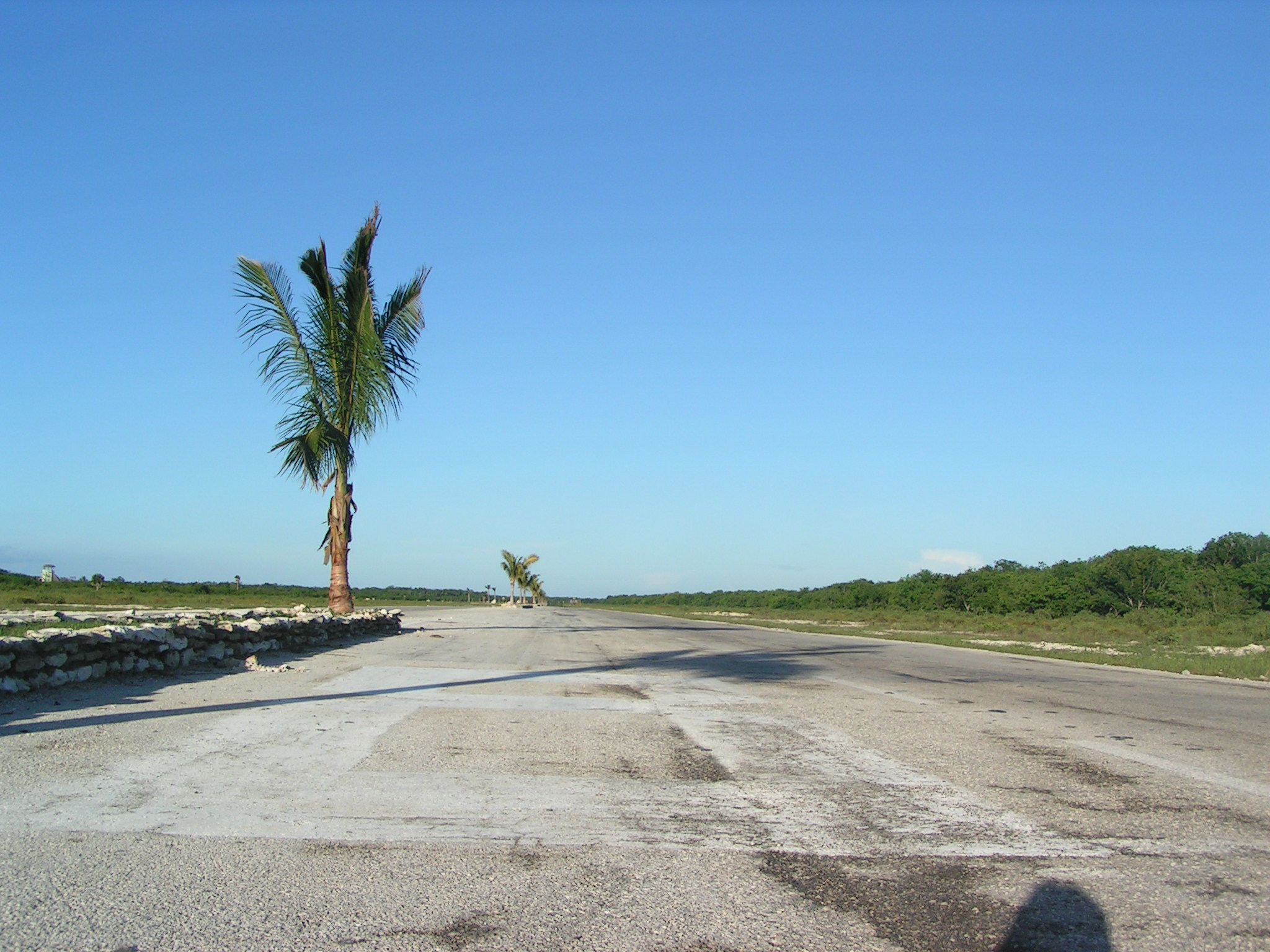
- Former runway of Cayo Coco airport, now highway
- IATA: none; ICAO: ~~MUOC~~

Summary
- Airport type: Defunct
- Location: Cayo Coco
- Coordinates: 22°30′58″N 078°30′32″W

Map
- Location in Cuba

Runways
Direction	Length		Surface
Direction	m	ft	Surface
			Asphalt

Cayo Coco ~~(ICAO: MUOC)~~ was an airport in Cayo Coco, Cuba that served as the main airport of the island until it was superseded by the Jardines del Rey Airport, which opened in 2002.

Clearing of the trees began in 1992, and the runway was laid by 1995. The former runway of the airport was incorporated as the new route of a highway heading west connecting Cayo Coco with Cayo Guillermo, although some runway markings and taxiways remain visible. The airport terminal buildings and surrounding area have been reclaimed as a small natural park called Parque Natural El Baga.

== Airlines and destinations ==
Airlines	Destinations
Nordwind Airlines	Seasonal charter: Moscow-Sheremetyevo
