= Punta de Maisí Airport =

Airport in Cuba

Punta de Maisi Airport
- IATA: UMA; ICAO: MUMA

Summary
- Airport type: Public
- Serves: Maisí
- Elevation AMSL: 35 ft / 11 m
- Coordinates: 20°14′35″N 74°08′50″W

Map
- Location of the airport in Cuba

Runways
Direction	Length		Surface
Direction	m	ft	Surface
07/25	900	2,953	Grass/sand
- Sources: GCM HERE Maps

Punta de Maisi Airport (IATA: UMA, ICAO: MUMA) is an airport serving the town of Maisí in the Guantánamo Province of Cuba.

== See also ==
- Transport in Cuba
- List of airports in Cuba
