= Guardalavaca Airport =

Airport serving Guardalavaca, Cuba

- IATA: none; ICAO: MUGV

Summary
- Airport type: Public
- Serves: Guardalavaca
- Elevation AMSL: 157 ft / 48 m
- Coordinates: 21°06′40″N 75°49′20″W

Map
- Location of the airport in Cuba

Runways
Direction	Length		Surface
Direction	m	ft	Surface
11/29	810	2,657	Asphalt, grass
- Sources: GCM Google Maps

Guardalavaca Airport (ICAO: MUGV) is an airport serving the town of Guardalavaca in the Holguín Province of Cuba.

The runway of deteriorated asphalt has significant grass encroachment.

This landing strip is not currently ready for commercial flights. It is near to the Guardalavaca spa, which gives it its name. This runway is used to land small planes and helicopters, both for tourist purposes. In order to enlarge the runway in the future, the road that connects the tourist area to the city of Banes would have to be diverted or a tunnel built so that the viaduct passes beneath.

== See also ==
- Transport in Cuba
- List of airports in Cuba
