= San Nicolás de Bari Airport =

- IATA: QSN; ICAO: MUNB

Summary
- Airport type: Public
- Serves: San Nicolás de Bari, Mayabeque Province, Cuba
- Elevation AMSL: 15 m / 49 ft
- Coordinates: 22°45′23″N 081°55′15″W

Map
- Location in Cuba

Runways
Direction	Length		Surface
Direction	m	ft	Surface
06/24	1,023	3,356	Asphalt
- Source: WAD, GCM, STV

San Nicolás de Bari Airport (IATA: QSN, ICAO: MUNB) is an airport serving San Nicolás de Bari, a municipality of the Mayabeque Province in Cuba.

== Facilities ==
The airport resides at an elevation of 15 m (49 ft) above mean sea level. It has one runway designated 06/24 with an asphalt surface measuring 1,023 m × 24 m (3,356 ft × 79 ft).
