= Jaime González Airport =

International airport that serves Cienfuegos, Cuba

Jaime González Airport Aeropuerto Internacional Jaime González
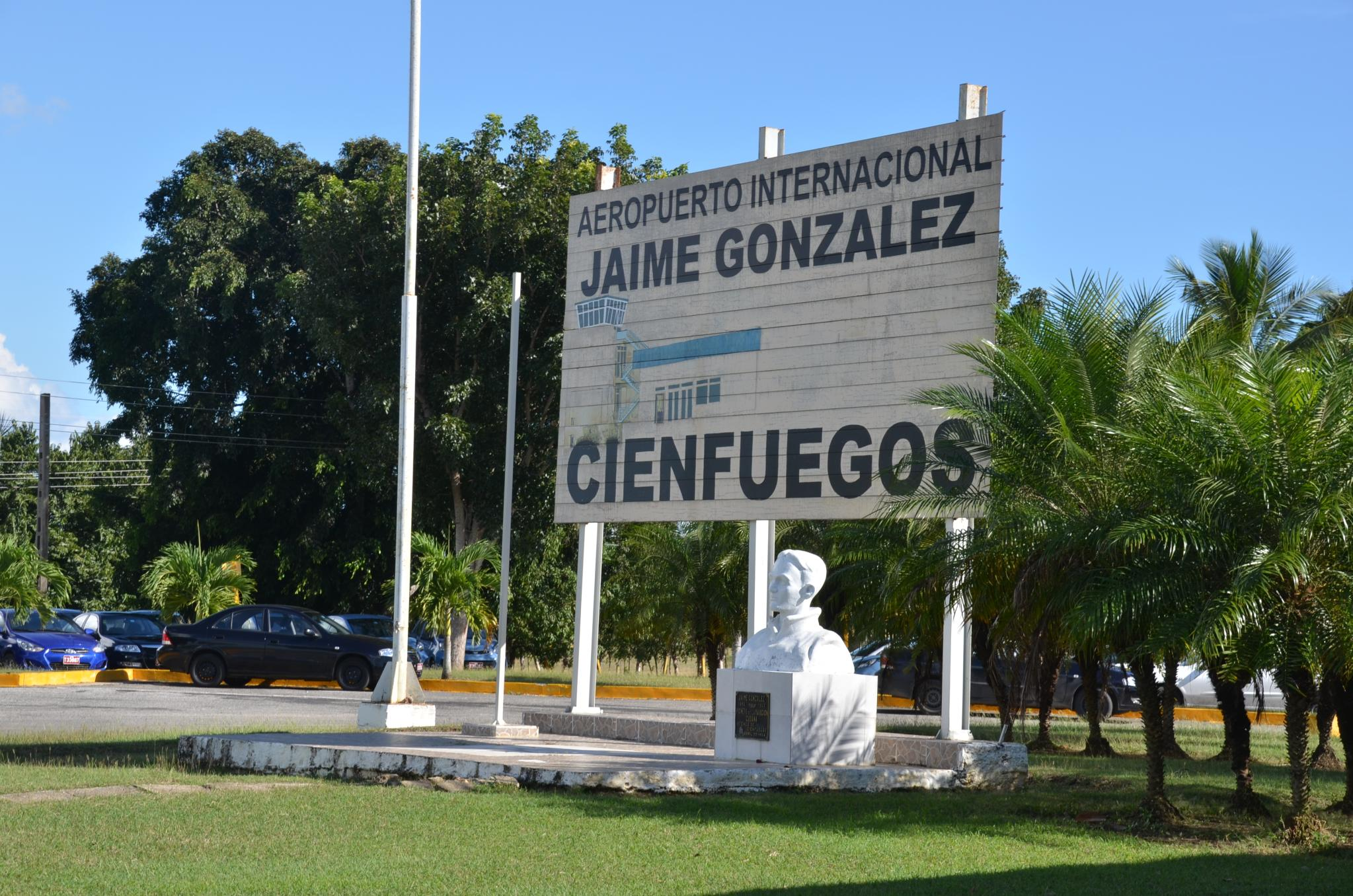
- Airport sign at the entrance
- IATA: CFG; ICAO: MUCF

Summary
- Airport type: Public
- Operator: ECASA
- Serves: Cienfuegos, Cuba
- Elevation AMSL: 31 m (102 ft)
- Coordinates: 22°09′00″N 080°23′51″W
- Website: cienfuegosinternational.com

Map
- Location in Cuba

Runways
Direction	Length		Surface
Direction	m	ft	Surface
02/20	2,400	7,874	Asphalt
- Source: Aerodrome chart

Jaime González Airport (Spanish: Aeropuerto Internacional Jaime González) (IATA: CFG, ICAO: MUCF) is an international airport that serves Cienfuegos, a city on the southern coast of Cuba, and capital of the province of Cienfuegos.

== Facilities ==
The airport is at an elevation of 31 metres (102 ft) above mean sea level; it has one runway designated 02/20 with an asphalt surface measuring 2,400 by 45 metres (7,874 ft × 148 ft).

== Cienfuegos Air Base ==
The airport is an inactive Cuban Revolutionary Armed Forces air base:

- 3684 Helicopter Regiment - Mil Mi-8TB transport helicopters, Mil Mi-24D attack/transport helicopter and Mil Mi-35 helicopter gunship/transport

During the war the base was set up to use a non-descript number for postal operations. They used the Fleet Post Office, Atlantic located in New York, New York with the address: 317 FPO NY. The US Navy code word for Cienfuegos during the war was ODOP.
