= Jardines del Rey Airport =

Airport on the island of Cayo Coco, Cuba

Jardines del Rey Airport Aeropuerto de Jardines del Rey
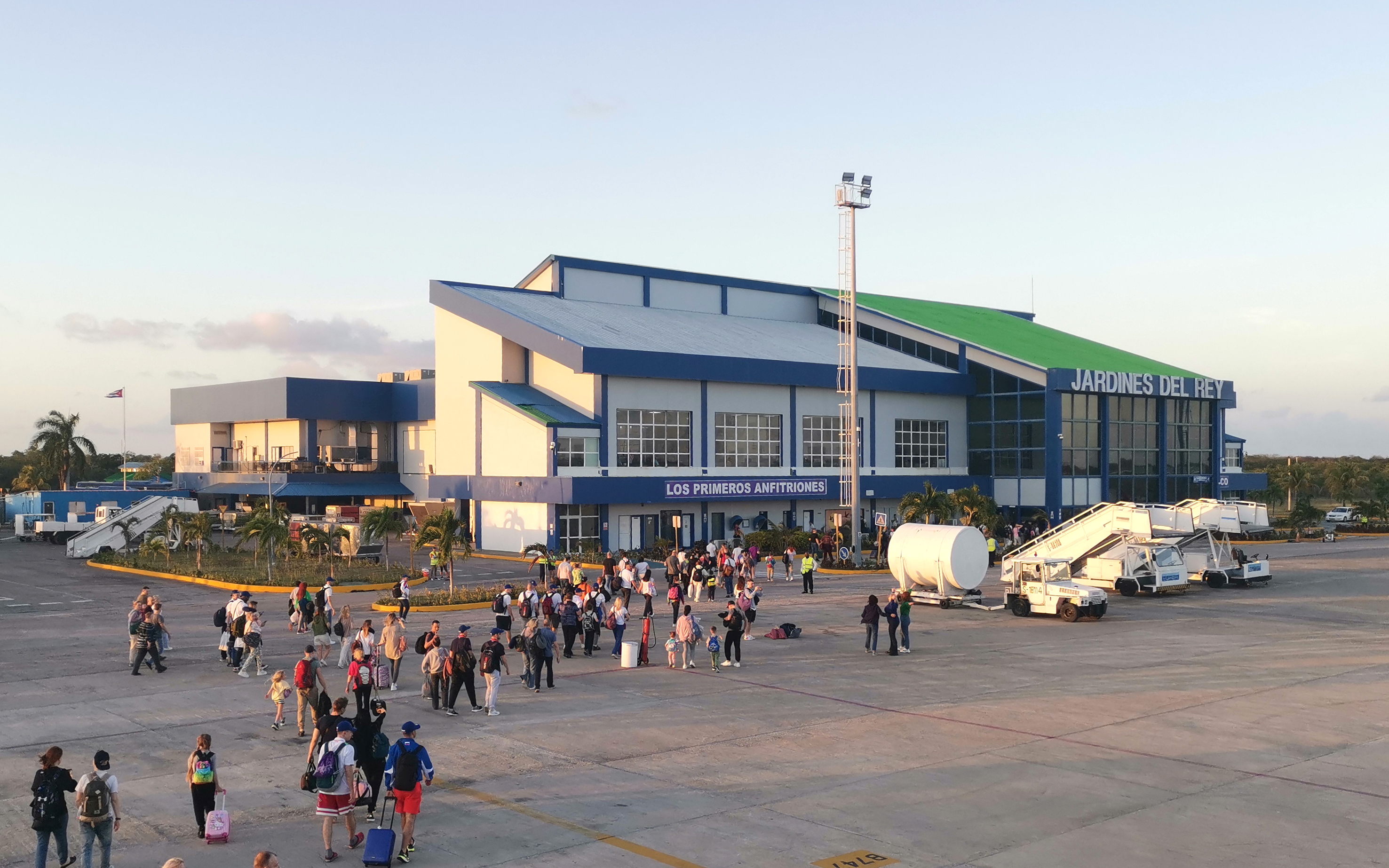
- IATA: CCC; ICAO: MUCC

Summary
- Airport type: Public
- Operator: Aena and ECASA
- Location: Cayo Coco, Ciego de Ávila Province, Cuba
- Elevation AMSL: 4 m (13 ft)
- Coordinates: 22°27′40″N 078°19′43″W

Map
- Location in Cuba

Runways
Direction	Length		Surface
Direction	m	ft	Surface
08/26	3,000	9,843	Asphalt

Jardines del Rey Airport (Spanish: Aeropuerto de Jardines del Rey, IATA: CCC, ICAO: MUCC) is an airport situated on the island of Cayo Coco, part of the Cuban province of Ciego de Ávila. It takes its name from the Jardines del Rey archipelago, which includes Cayo Coco. Inaugurated in December 2002, the airport was built to better serve tourists to the island, who previously had to arrive at Máximo Gómez Airport about 70 kilometres (43 mi) to the south. Jardines del Rey Airport is the only airport in Cuba managed in part by a foreign company; Aena and ECASA jointly operate the airport. It receives well over 200,000 passengers per year, most of whom are foreign tourists from Canada.

== History ==
In the early 1990s, the Cuban government began to develop the tourism sector in Cayo Coco, and several resorts were constructed. To reach Cayo Coco, tourists had to fly to Máximo Gómez Airport on the mainland and then take a one-hour bus ride to the island. In order to make travel to Cayo Coco more convenient, the Cuban government announced in 1999 that it would build a new airport on the island itself. Environmentalists disapproved of the site selected for the airport, but the government responded that the site was located in a zone already designated for infrastructure development. Meanwhile, the existing Cayo Coco Airport on the island, situated in a more environmentally sensitive area, would be demolished and reforested.

Construction of the airport commenced in January 2000. Later in the year, Spanish airports company Aena signed a contract with the Cuban government to build and operate the new airport, thus becoming the first foreign entity to manage a Cuban airport. Management is shared with the Cuban company ECASA. The first phase of the project was completed in early 2002, which encompassed the construction of the runway, taxiways, apron, air traffic control tower and a temporary terminal with a capacity for 150 passengers. The airport was officially inaugurated on 26 December 2002 upon the completion of a larger terminal, which brought the airport's annual capacity to 1.2 million passengers.

The airport suffered major damage from Hurricane Irma in September 2017. Authorities proceeded with a significant renovation of the terminal, rebuilding the walls with concrete so that they can better withstand such conditions in the future. In addition, new stores were built and a centralized air-conditioning system was installed. Jardines del Rey Airport was able to reopen in early November 2017, in time for the start of the winter tourist season.

== Infrastructure ==
=== Terminal ===
The terminal is 6,000 square metres (65,000 sq ft) in size and can handle 600 passengers per hour. Its amenities include two VIP lounges, a snack bar, restaurant, duty-free shops and a currency exchange booth.

=== Airfield ===
Jardines del Rey Airport has a single runway, 08/26, which measures 3,000 by 45 metres (9,843 ft × 148 ft) and is equipped with an instrument landing system. The apron has three parking spaces and is connected to the runway by two taxiways.

== Airlines and destinations ==
The following airlines operate regular scheduled and charter flights at Jardines del Rey Airport:

Airlines	Destinations
Aerogaviota	Havana

== Access ==
Jardines del Rey Airport is much closer to the resorts on Cayo Coco than Máximo Gómez Airport, which previously served the island. A causeway links the airport and the rest of Cayo Coco to the Cuban mainland.
