= Florida Airport (Cuba) =

Airport serving Florida, Cuba

- IATA: none; ICAO: MUFL

Summary
- Airport type: Public
- Serves: Florida, Cuba
- Elevation AMSL: 60 m / 197 ft
- Coordinates: 21°29′59″N 078°12′10″W

Map
- Location in Cuba

Runways
Direction	Length		Surface
Direction	m	ft	Surface
08/26	990	3,248	Asphalt
- Source: DAFIF

Florida Airport (ICAO: MUFL) is a defunct airport near Florida, a municipality in the province of Camagüey in Cuba.

== History ==
At this place was already an airfield in the 1940s. It was used to house small airplanes used in agriculture to spray crops with insecticides. In the 1970s, the plane field was paved and given the name Santiago Tomas del Sol Flores, a Cuban pilot who was killed in Mozambique. Small aircraft of the type PZL Mielec M-18 Dromader and AN-2 were based there. Soon after the collapse of the Soviet Union, operations came to a halt and the remaining aircraft were transferred to the larger airport at Camaguey.

== Facilities ==
The airport resides at an elevation of 60 m (200 ft) above mean sea level. It has one runway designated 08/26 with an asphalt surface measuring 990 m × 27 m (3,248 ft × 89 ft).
