= San Nicolás de Bari =

San Nicolás de Bari San Nicolás
- Municipality
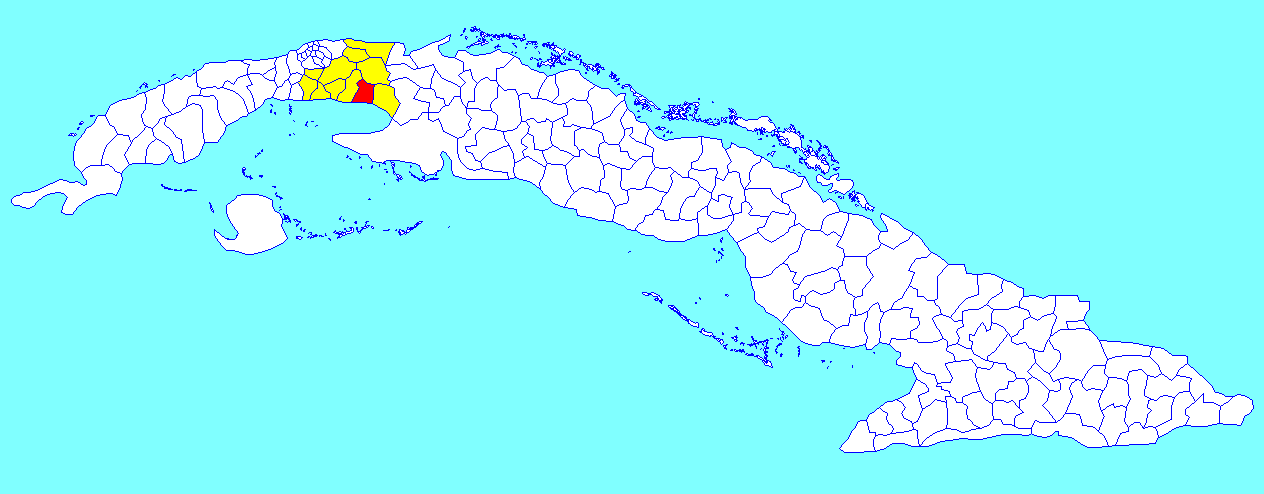
- San Nicolás municipality (red) within Mayabeque Province (yellow) and Cuba
- Coordinates: 22°46′55″N 81°54′25″W
- Country: Cuba
- Province: Mayabeque
- Founded: 1846
- Established: 1879 (Municipality)

Area
  - Total: 242 km^{2} (93 sq mi)
- Elevation: 30 m (98 ft)

Population (2004)
  - Total: 21,563
  - Density: 89.1/km^{2} (231/sq mi)
- Time zone: UTC-5 (EST)
- Area code: +53-7

San Nicolás de Bari, also named San Nicolás, is a municipality and town in the Mayabeque Province of Cuba. It was founded in 1846.

== Geography ==
The municipality is divided into the barrios of Hector Molina, Babiney Prieto, Barbudo, Caimito, Gabriel, Jobo, Pueblo y Paradero and Zaldívar.

== Demographics ==
In 2004, the municipality of San Nicolás had a population of 21,563. With a total area of 242 km^{2} (93 sq mi), it has a population density of 89.1/km^{2} (231/sq mi).

Celebrities: Yoandry Alonso

== See also ==
- San Nicolás de Bari Airport
- San Nicolás de Bari Municipal Museum
- Municipalities of Cuba
- List of cities in Cuba
