= La Coloma Airport =

Airport in Cuba

La Coloma Airport Aeropuerto "La Coloma"
- IATA: LCL; ICAO: MULM

Summary
- Airport type: Public
- Serves: Pinar del Río, Cuba
- Location: La Coloma
- Elevation AMSL: 40 m / 131 ft
- Coordinates: 22°20′11″N 083°38′32″W

Map
- Location in Cuba

Runways
Direction	Length		Surface
Direction	m	ft	Surface
07/25	2,000	6,562	Asphalt
- Source: Instituto de Aeronáutica Civil de Cuba,DAFIF

La Coloma Airport (Spanish: Aeropuerto "La Coloma") (IATA: LCL, ICAO: MULM) is an airport serving the city of Pinar del Río, in Cuba. It is located near the village of La Coloma and has no regular flights.

== Facilities ==
The airport resides at an elevation of 40 m (130 ft) above mean sea level. It has one runway designated 07/25 with an asphalt surface measuring 2,000 m × 45 m (6,562 ft × 148 ft).

== La Coloma Air Training ==
The airport is home to the 1660th Primary Training Squadron (L-39C) training unit of the Cuban Revolutionary Armed Forces.

== See also ==
- Pinar del Río Airport
