= Sancti Spíritus Airport =

- IATA: USS; ICAO: MUSS

Summary
- Airport type: Public
- Serves: Sancti Spíritus, Cuba
- Elevation AMSL: 90 m / 295 ft
- Coordinates: 21°58′12″N 079°26′34″W

Map
- Location in Cuba

Runways
Direction	Length		Surface
Direction	m	ft	Surface
03/21	1,801	5,909	Asphalt
- Source: DAFIF

Sancti Spíritus Airport (IATA: USS, ICAO: MUSS) is an airport serving Sancti Spíritus, the capital city of the Sancti Spíritus Province in Cuba.

== Facilities ==
The airport resides at an elevation of 90 m (295 ft) above mean sea level. It has one runway designated 03/21 with an asphalt surface measuring 1,801 m × 29 m (5,909 ft × 95 ft).
