= Managua Airport (Cuba) =

- IATA: none; ICAO: MUMG

Summary
- Airport type: Military
- Serves: Havana
- Elevation AMSL: 377 ft / 115 m
- Coordinates: 22°58′12″N 82°16′30″W

Map
- Location of the airport in Cuba

Runways
| Direction | Length | | Surface |
| Direction | m | ft | Surface |
|---|---|---|---|
| 10/28 | 2,460 | 8,071 | Asphalt |
- Sources: GCM

Managua Airport (ICAO: MUMG) is a military airport based 17 kilometres (11 mi) south of Havana, the capital of Cuba, on the border between Havana and Mayabeque provinces.

== See also ==
- Transport in Cuba
- List of airports in Cuba
