= Empresa Cubana de Aeropuertos y Servicios Aeronáuticos =

Empresa Cubana de Aeropuertos y Servicios Aeronáuticos S.A. (ECASA)
- Industry: Airport operators, air traffic control, aviation safety
- Headquarters: Havana, Cuba

Empresa Cubana de Aeropuertos y Servicios Aeronáuticos S.A. (ECASA) is a government-owned company which operates 22 airports in Cuba, including José Martí International Airport, which serves Havana.

Other responsibilities of ECASA include air traffic control, aviation safety, check-in and baggage handling.

== See also ==
- List of airports in Cuba
