= Kawama Airport =

Kawama Airport Aeropuerto "Kawama"
- IATA: VRO; ICAO: MUKW

Summary
- Airport type: Public
- Serves: Varadero, Matanzas Province, Cuba
- Elevation AMSL: 5 m / 16 ft
- Coordinates: 23°07′25″N 081°18′07″W

Map
- Location in Cuba

Runways
Direction	Length		Surface
Direction	m	ft	Surface
06/24	1,500	4,921	Asphalt
- Source:Instituto de Aeronáutica Civil de Cuba, DAFIF,

Kawama Airport (Spanish: Aeropuerto "Kawama") (IATA: VRO, ICAO: MUKW) is an airport serving Varadero, in the Matanzas Province in Cuba.

== History ==
Kawama Airport was the original international airport serving Varadero. It served over 330,000 Cubans who fled the country for the United States during the Freedom Flights. However, as the tourism sector in the region developed, Kawama Airport grew too close to the beaches and resorts, creating noise issues for visitors. In addition, the nearby hotel developments would hinder attempts at expanding the airport. As a result, the new Juan Gualberto Gómez Airport opened in 1989 to replace Kawama Airport. Most flights operated out of Kawama Airport now are operated by Aerogaviota and ENSA. These are most commonly skydiving charters for tourists and charters for media, among others.

== Facilities ==
The airport is at an elevation of 5 m (16 ft) above mean sea level. It has one runway designated 06/24 with an asphalt surface measuring 1,500 m × 45 m (4,921 ft × 148 ft). The airport is a remnant of the old Varadero airport which was replaced by the new international Varadero airport in the 90's. The runway was shortened and now is used only for small aircraft for touristic and sport purpose. The disused section of the runway is still used for aircraft reaching the north tarmac.

== Accidents and incidents ==
- 3 July 1961 - Cubana de Aviación Douglas DC-3 was hijacked en route to Varadero Airport from Havana. The aircraft landed in Miami.
- 25 April 1959 - Cubana de Aviación Vickers Viscount was hijacked after takeoff from the Varadero Airport and forced to land at Key West International Airport.
- 1 November 1958 - Cubana de Aviación Flight 495, a Vickers Viscount 755D crashed in Nipe Bay while attempting an emergency landing at Preston Airport. The plane was en route to Varadero from Miami with 20 on board. Only 3 survived with 17 fatalities.
