= Orestes Acosta Airport =

Regional airport that serves Moa, Cuba

Orestes Acosta Airport Aeropuerto Orestes Acosta
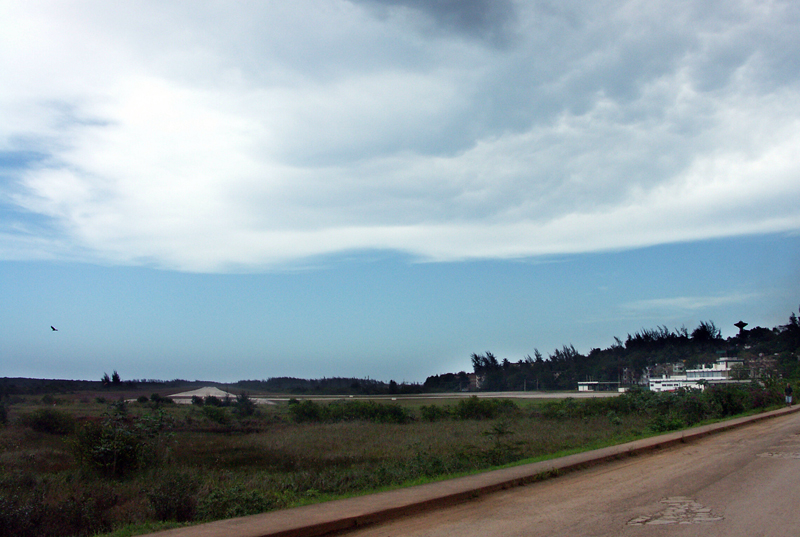
- IATA: MOA; ICAO: MUMO

Summary
- Airport type: Public
- Serves: Moa, Holguín Province, Cuba
- Elevation AMSL: 5 m / 16 ft
- Coordinates: 20°39′14″N 74°55′20″W

Map
- Location in Cuba

Runways
Direction	Length		Surface
Direction	m	ft	Surface
07/25	1,860	6,102	Asphalt
- Source: Aerodrome chart Source: DAFIF

Orestes Acosta Airport (Spanish: Aeropuerto Orestes Acosta) (IATA: MOA, ICAO: MUMO) is a regional airport that serves Moa, a municipality in the Holguín Province of Cuba.

== Facilities ==
The airport resides at an elevation of 5 m (16 ft) above mean sea level. It has one runway designated 07/25 with an asphalt surface measuring 1,860 m × 30 m (6,102 ft × 98 ft).
