= Juan Gualberto Gómez Airport =

Airport in Matanzas Province, Cuba

Varadero International Airport Juan Gualberto Gomez Airport
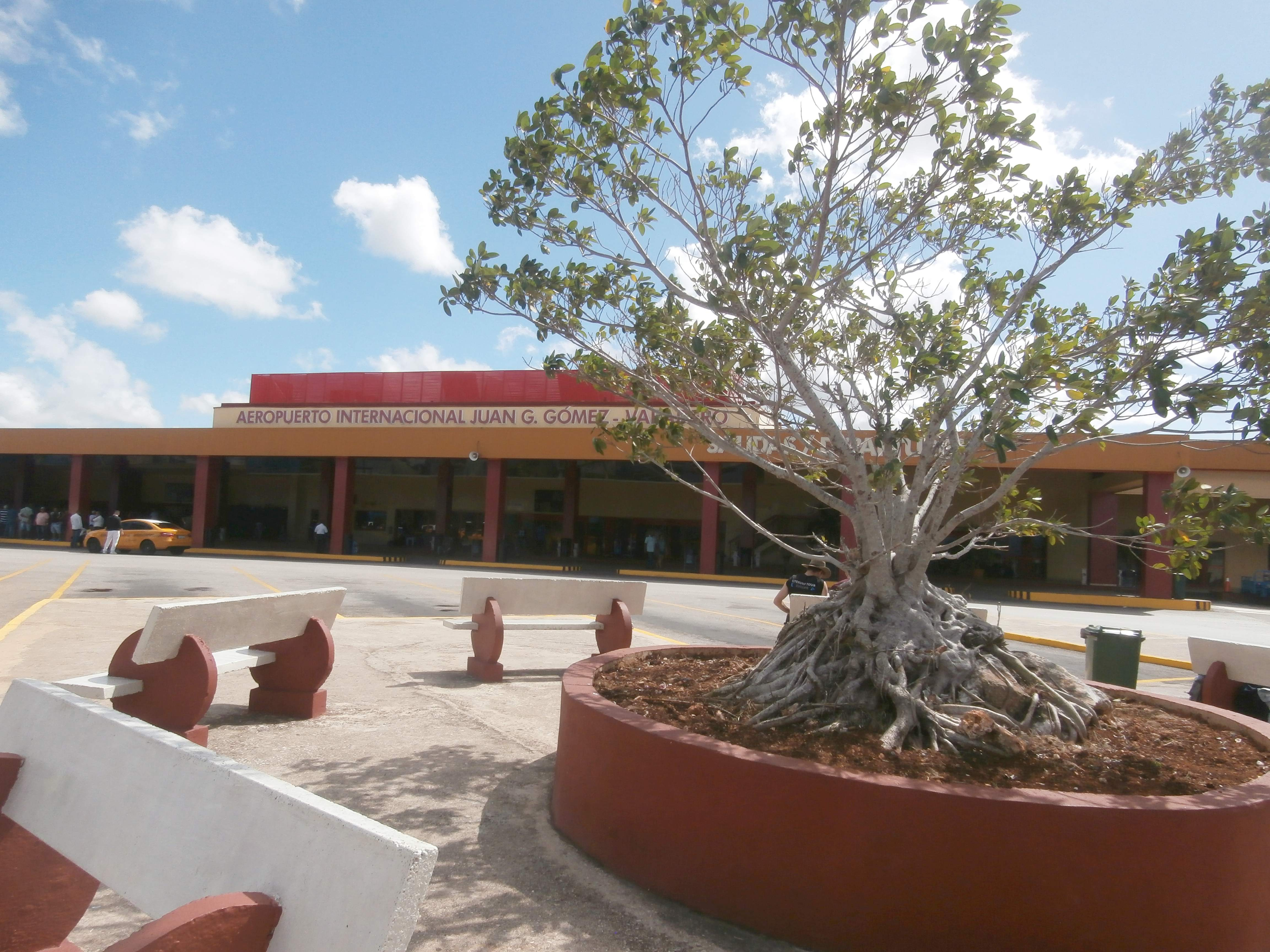
- IATA: VRA; ICAO: MUVR

Summary
- Airport type: Public
- Operator: ECASA S.A.
- Serves: Varadero and Matanzas
- Location: 5 km from Carbonera
- Elevation AMSL: 64 m (210 ft)
- Coordinates: 23°02′04″N 81°26′07″W

Map
- Location in Cuba

Runways
| Direction | Length | | Surface |
| Direction | m | ft | Surface |
|---|---|---|---|
| 06/24 | 3,502 | 11,490 | Asphalt |

Statistics (2018)
- Number of Passengers: 2,515,308
- Source: Aerodrome chart

Juan Gualberto Gómez Airport (IATA: VRA, ICAO: MUVR), formerly known as Varadero Airport (Spanish: Aeropuerto de Varadero), is an international airport serving Varadero, Cuba, and the province of Matanzas. The airport is located 5 km from the village of Carbonera, closer to the city of Matanzas than to Varadero. The closest airport to Varadero is Kawama Airport. In 2009, the airport handled 1.28 million passengers, making it the second busiest airport in Cuba after José Martí International Airport in Havana.

== History ==
Juan Gualberto Gomez Airport was built in 1989 and inaugurated by Fidel Castro, thus replacing the old Varadero airport located in Santa Marta, currently known as Kawama Airport. The airport was named after a journalist, fighter for the Cuban Independence and black rights activist in Cuba Juan Gualberto Gómez (1854–1933).

In April 2020, Cuba stopped all scheduled flights. In October 2020, it was announced that the airport would be reopening for flights with tourists being restricted to a "bubble", but before that began, the province moved to the "new normality" and the airport reopened for regular commercial flights, with flights from Mexico and the UK.

In 2024, TUI terminated all flights to Varadero, which it had served from both Amsterdam and Brussels, due to a sharp decline in passenger figures to Cuba. Condor followed by announcing to terminate their route to Frankfurt in 2025, leaving the airport without year-round services to Europe.

== Facilities ==
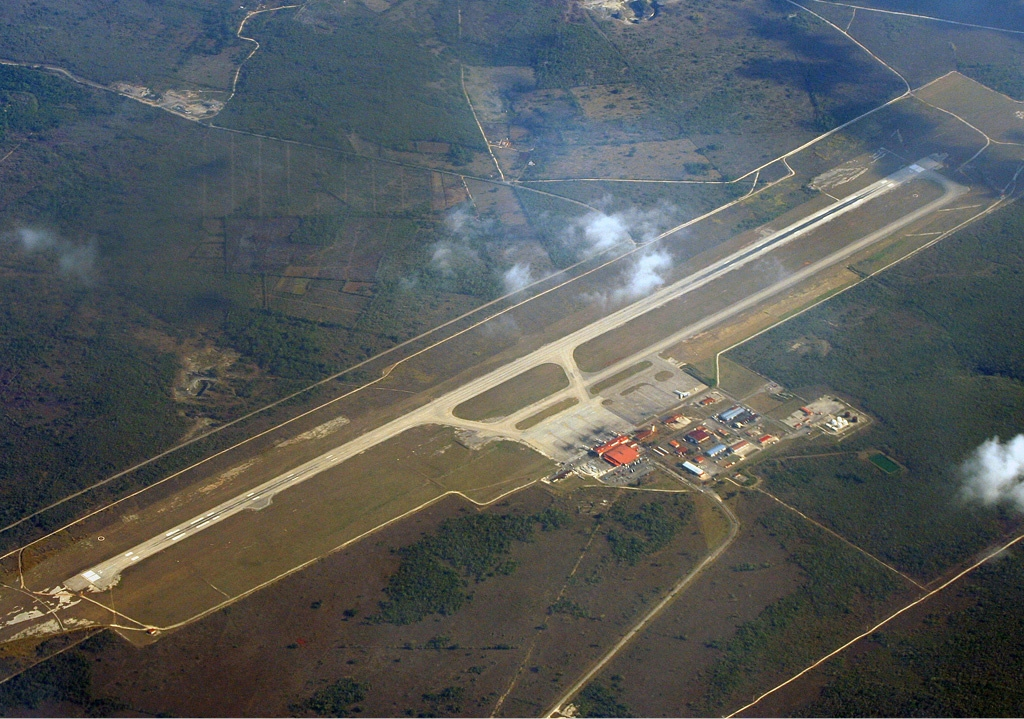
Aerial view

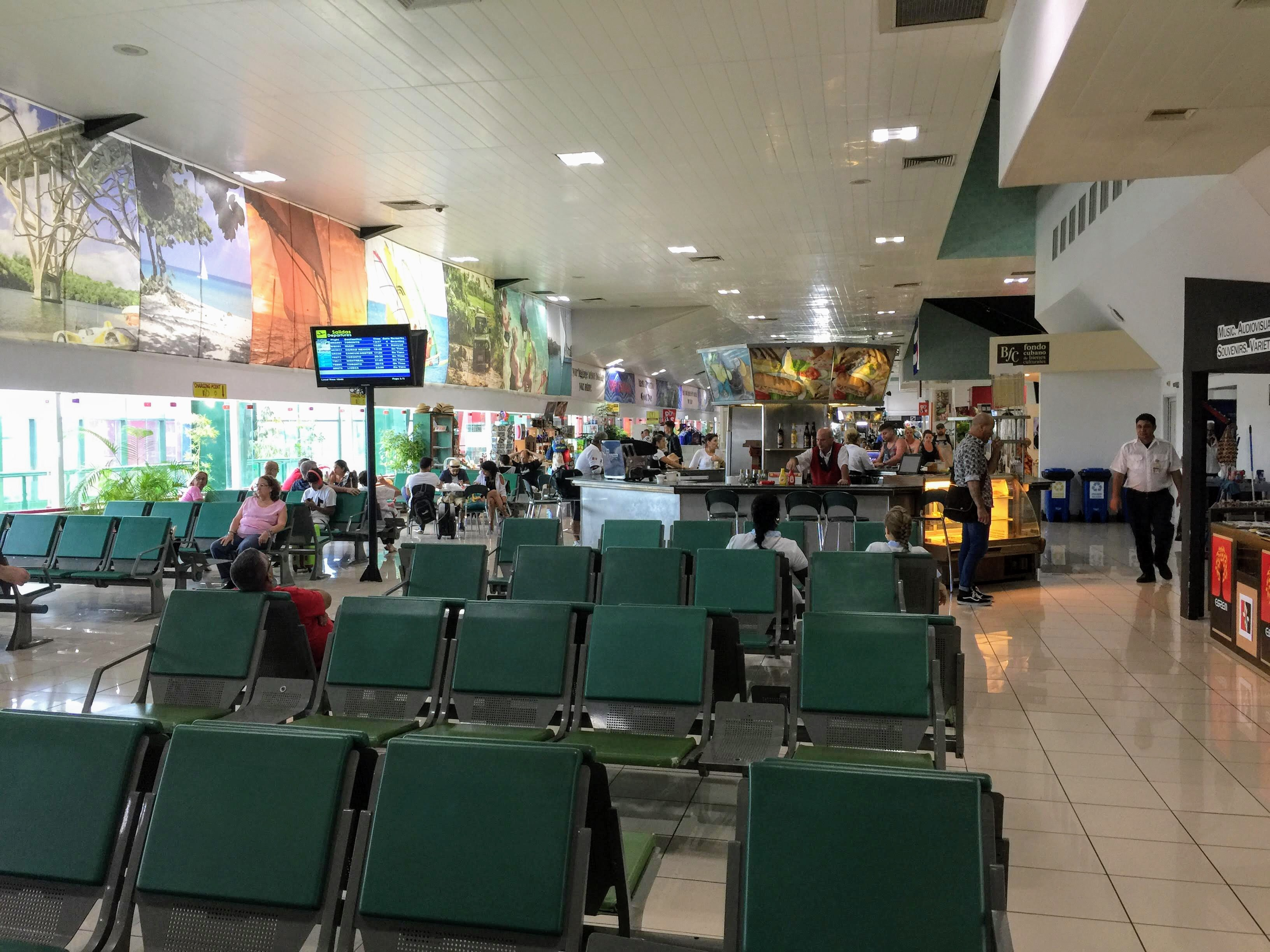
Terminal interior

The terminal building has shops for tourists (including rum, cigars, T-shirts, books, carvings, pharmaceuticals) both before customs check point, at a large departures lounge with cafeterias on the upper level and a smaller air conditioned VIP lounge the lower level. Immigration checkpoint consists of wooden booths for push doors opened by immigration officers after travelers have been processed. Customs check point consists of three x-ray machines. Two flights of stairs and an escalator take travelers to the departure lounge. Tour operators offices are located near the domestic terminal area. The ground handling equipment is imported mainly from North America. There are four jet bridges (serving parking areas 2 to 5), but air stairs are used for the remaining aircraft parking space #1 on the apron by the terminal.

== Airlines and destinations ==
The following airlines operate regular scheduled and charter flights at Juan Gualberto Gómez Airport:

| Airlines | Destinations |
|---|---|
| American Airlines | Miami |

== Accidents and incidents ==
- 29 December 1992 - Aerocaribbean Antonov 26 was hijacked en route to Varadero Airport from Havana. The aircraft landed in Miami.
- 6 March 2005 - Air Transat Flight 961, an Airbus A310 returned safely to airport following detachment of rudder after takeoff.
