= Máximo Gómez Airport =

Regional airport in the Ciego de Ávila Province, Cuba

Máximo Gómez Airport Aeropuerto Máximo Gómez
- IATA: AVI; ICAO: MUCA

Summary
- Airport type: Public
- Operator: Government
- Serves: Ciego de Ávila, Cuba
- Elevation AMSL: 102 m / 335 ft
- Coordinates: 22°01′37″N 078°47′22″W

Map
- Location in Cuba

Runways
Direction	Length		Surface
Direction	m	ft	Surface
07/25	3,532	11,588	Asphalt
- Source: Aerodrome chart, STV

Máximo Gómez Airport (IATA: AVI, ICAO: MUCA) is a regional airport in the Ciego de Ávila Province of Cuba which serves the city of Ciego de Ávila.

== History ==
It is named for Máximo Gómez, a Major General in the Ten Years' War (1868–1878) and Cuba's military commander in the Cuban War of Independence (1895–1898). It received flights mostly from Canada during the 1990s, with tourists going to the resorts on the island of Cayo Coco. Since the construction of Jardines Del Rey Airport in 2002, there were only domestic flights to Havana, which recently ended as well, leaving this airport unserved by any scheduled airlines. This airport closed when the new airport of Jardines Del Rey opened, in 2002.
