= Hermanos Ameijeiras Airport =

Airport that serves Las Tunas, Cuba

- IATA: VTU; ICAO: MUVT

Summary
- Serves: Las Tunas, Cuba
- Elevation AMSL: 100 m / 328 ft
- Coordinates: 20°59′16″N 076°56′09″W

Map
- Location in Cuba

Runways
Direction	Length		Surface
Direction	m	ft	Surface
05/23	1,820	5,971	Asphalt
- Source: Aerodrome chart

Hermanos Ameijeiras Airport (IATA: VTU, ICAO: MUVT) is a regional airport that serves the city of Las Tunas in Cuba. It is located into its north-eastern suburb.
