= Las Tunas =

Las Tunas Victoria de Las Tunas
- Municipality
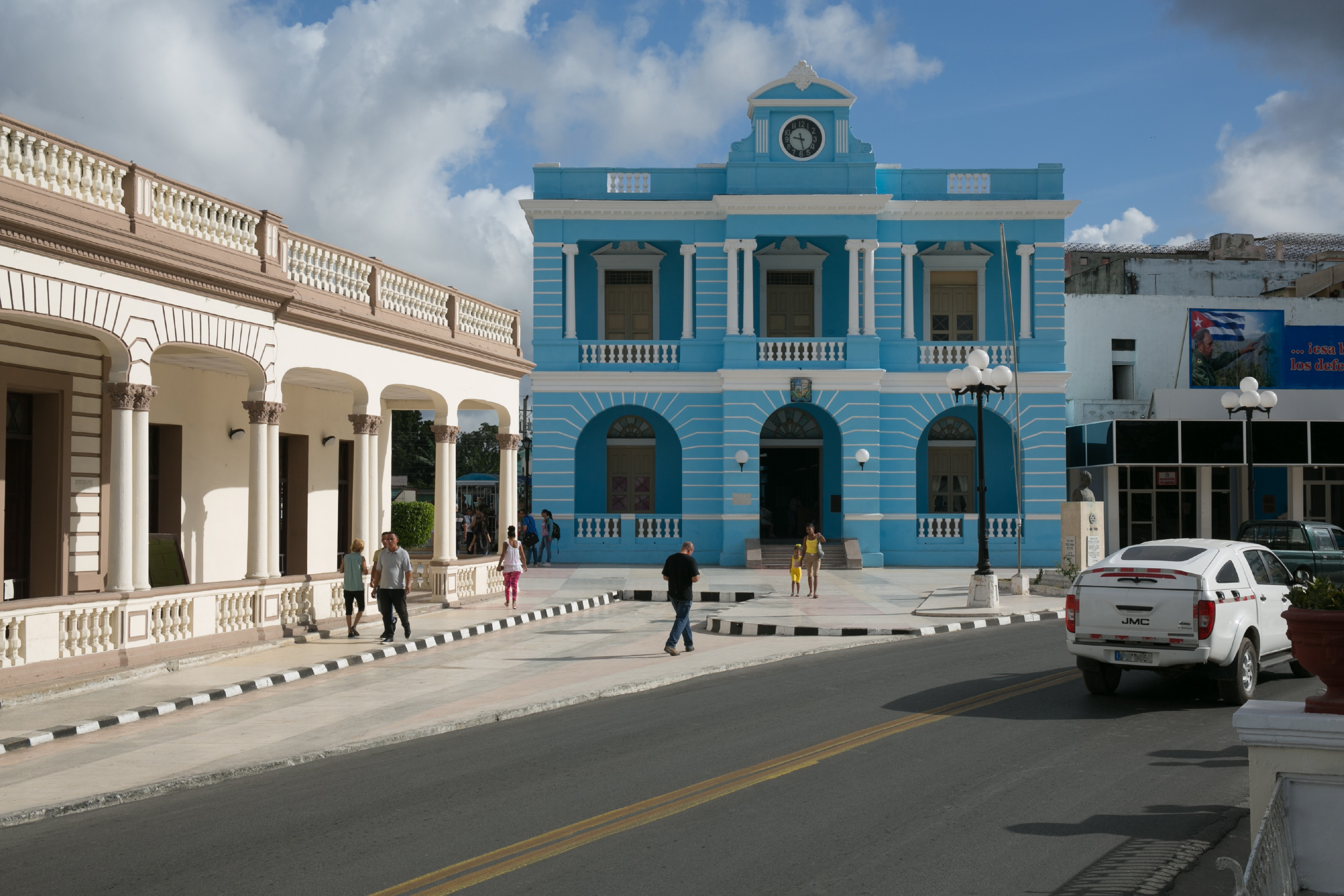
- Street Vicente García in Las Tunas

- Coat of arms

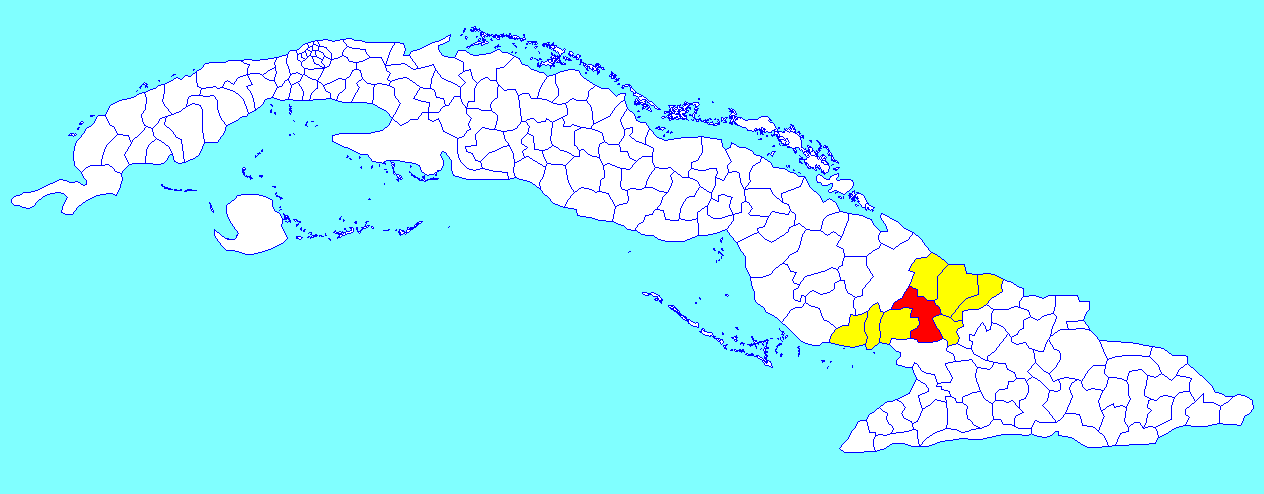
- Las Tunas municipality (red) within Las Tunas Province (yellow) and Cuba
- Coordinates: 20°57′35″N 76°57′16″W
- Country: Cuba
- Province: Las Tunas
- Established: 1759

Government
  - President: Juana Yamilka Viñals Suárez

Area
  - Total: 891 km^{2} (344 sq mi)
- Elevation: 92 m (302 ft)

Population (2022)
  - Total: 214,939
  - Density: 241/km^{2} (625/sq mi)
- Demonym: Tunero/a
- Time zone: UTC−5 (EST)
- Postal code: 75100-75500
- Area code: +53 31

Las Tunas is a city and municipality in central-eastern Cuba. It is the capital of the Las Tunas Province and was named Victoria de Las Tunas from 1869 to 1976.

== Geography ==
The city of Las Tunas is located in along the Carretera Central (highway), between the cities of Camagüey, Holguín and Bayamo.

In 1943 the municipality was divided into the barrios of Primero, Segundo, Antonio Machado, Arenas, Caisimú, Cauto del Paso, Cuaba, Curana, Dumañuecos, Ojo de Agua, Oriente, Palmarito, Playuelas and San José de la Plata. The city is currently divided into the repartos (division under barrios) of Primero (city centre), Segundo, La Victoria, Aguilera, Santo Domingo, Pena, La Loma, Aurora, Velázquez, Sosa, Casa Piedra, Israel Santos, Buena Vista, Alturas de Buena Vista, Propulsión, Aeropuerto and Reparto Militar.

== History ==
The city was founded in 1796 around the Parish of San Jerónimo. In 1853, after a Royal Decree, it received the title of "city". In 1976, following the suppression of the Oriente Province and its split up, Las Tunas became the capital of the new and eponymous province.

== Demographics ==
In 2022, the municipality of Las Tunas had a population of 214,939. With a total area of 891 km^{2} (344 sq mi), it has a population density of 240/km^{2} (620/sq mi).

== Climate ==
Las Tunas has a tropical savannah climate (Aw) with hot daytime temperatures and mild to warm night time temperatures year round.

Climate data for Victoria de las Tunas, Cuba
Month	Jan	Feb	Mar	Apr	May	Jun	Jul	Aug	Sep	Oct	Nov	Dec	Year
Mean daily maximum °C (°F)	28 (82)	29 (84)	30 (86)	31 (88)	31 (88)	32 (90)	33 (91)	33 (91)	32 (90)	31 (88)	29 (84)	28 (82)	31 (87)
Mean daily minimum °C (°F)	19 (66)	19 (66)	20 (68)	21 (70)	22 (72)	23 (73)	24 (75)	24 (75)	23 (73)	23 (73)	21 (70)	20 (68)	22 (71)

== Transport ==
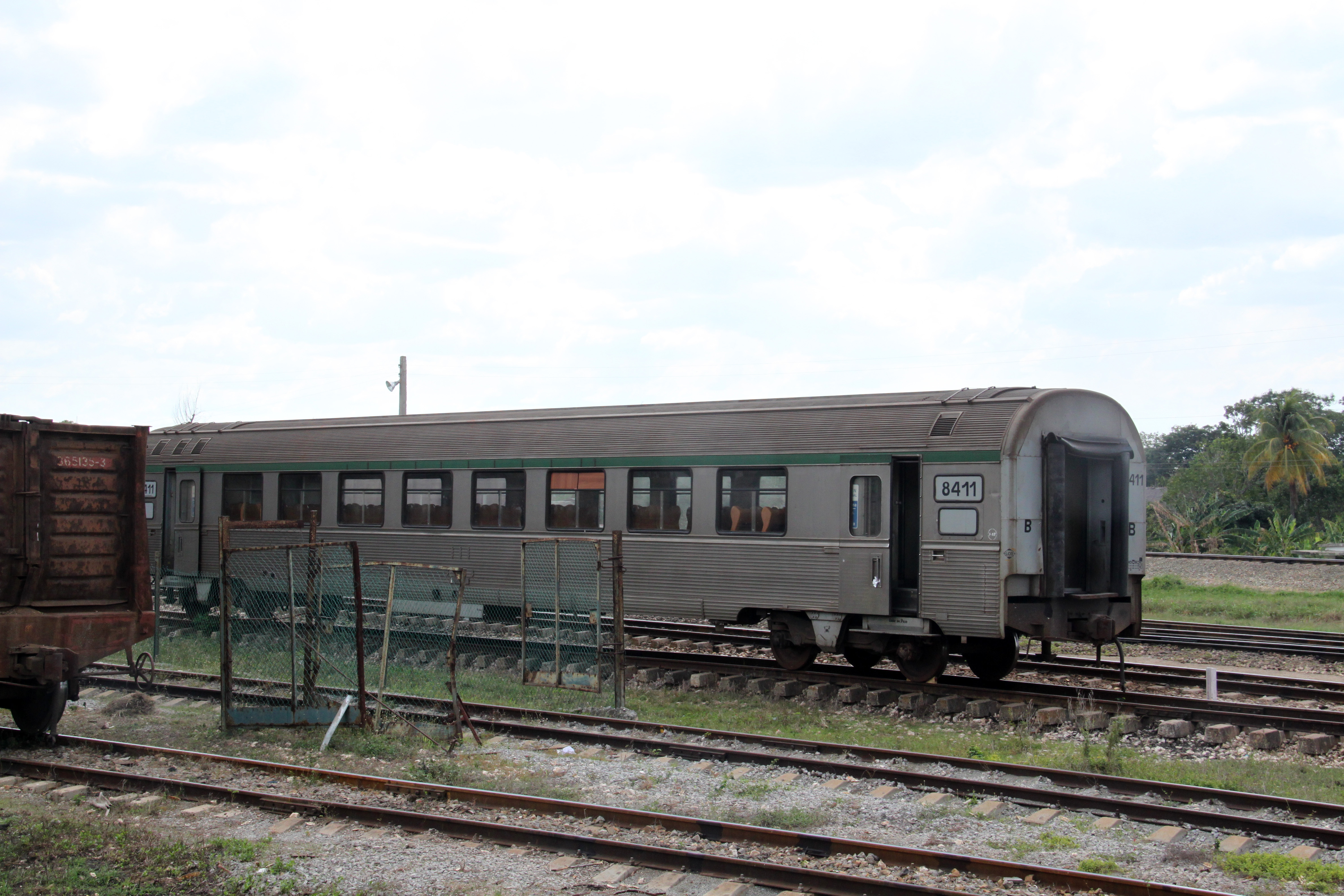
A coach of the Tren Francés in Las Tunas station depot

Las Tunas counts a railway station on the principal Havana–Santiago de Cuba line and on a secondary line to Manatí. A planned extension of the A1 motorway, that will span the entire island, will interest the City. The local airport is the Hermanos Ameijeiras, located in the northern suburb.

== Tourism ==
Known in Cuba as the "City of Sculpture" (due to the several artistic installations scattered throughout the city centre) Las Tunas is in the least visited province in Cuba. In spite of this, the city has two international hotels (Hotel Las Tunas and Hotel Cadillac) and 219 B&Bs

However, the local and the central government are both working in order to increase tourism in the province. In July 2015, within the framework of the Foreign Investment Law, the government is trying to attract foreign partners to build large hotel complexes in the still unspoilt Covarrubia beach.

== Sport ==
The local baseball club is Las Tunas, nicknamed Leñadores (meaning “Lumberjacks”) and its home ground is the Julio Antonio Mella Stadium. The association football club is the FC Las Tunas, and its home ground is the Ovidio Torres Stadium.

== Notable residents ==
- Yaquelín Abdalá (born 1968), visual artist
- Yordan Alvarez (born 1997), Major League Baseball player, and former Leñadores member
- Vicente García González (1833–1886) General in the Cuban Ten Years' War

== Twin ==
- Arroyo Seco (Querétaro, Mexico)

== See also ==
- Hermanos Ameijeiras Airport
- Municipalities of Cuba
- List of cities in Cuba
