= Siguanea Airport =

Siguanea Airport Aeropuerto "Siguanea"
- IATA: SZJ; ICAO: MUSN

Summary
- Airport type: Public
- Serves: Isla de la Juventud, Cuba
- Elevation AMSL: 12 m / 39 ft
- Coordinates: 21°38′33″N 082°57′18″W

Map
- Location in Cuba

Runways
Direction	Length		Surface
Direction	m	ft	Surface
05/23	1,800	5,906	Asphalt
- Source: DAFIF

Siguanea Airport (Spanish: Aeropuerto "Siguanea") (IATA: SZJ, ICAO: MUSN) is an airfield serving Isla de la Juventud special municipality in Cuba. It is located near to the "Colony" tourist resort at the Siguanea gulf. It has no regular flights.

== Facilities ==
The airport resides at an elevation of 12 m (39 ft) above mean sea level. It has one runway designated 05/23 with an asphalt surface measuring 1,800 m × 30 m (5,906 ft × 98 ft).
