= Pinar del Río Airport =

Abandoned airport in Cuba

- IATA: ~~QPD~~; ICAO: MUPR

Summary
- Airport type: Public
- Serves: Pinar del Río, Cuba
- Elevation AMSL: 40 m (130 ft)
- Coordinates: 22°25′17″N 083°40′42″W

Map
- Location in Cuba

Runways
Direction	Length		Surface
Direction	m	ft	Surface
08/26	1,120	3,675	Asphalt
- Source: WAD, GCM

Pinar del Río Airport (IATA: ~~QPD~~, ICAO: MUPR) is an abandoned airport which formerly served Pinar del Río, the capital city of Pinar del Río Province in Cuba.

== Facilities ==
The airport stands at an elevation of 40 m (130 ft) above mean sea level. It has one runway designated 08/26 with an asphalt surface measuring 1,120 m × 37 m (3,675 ft × 121 ft).

== See also ==
- La Coloma Airport
