= Boarding stairs =

Boarding device

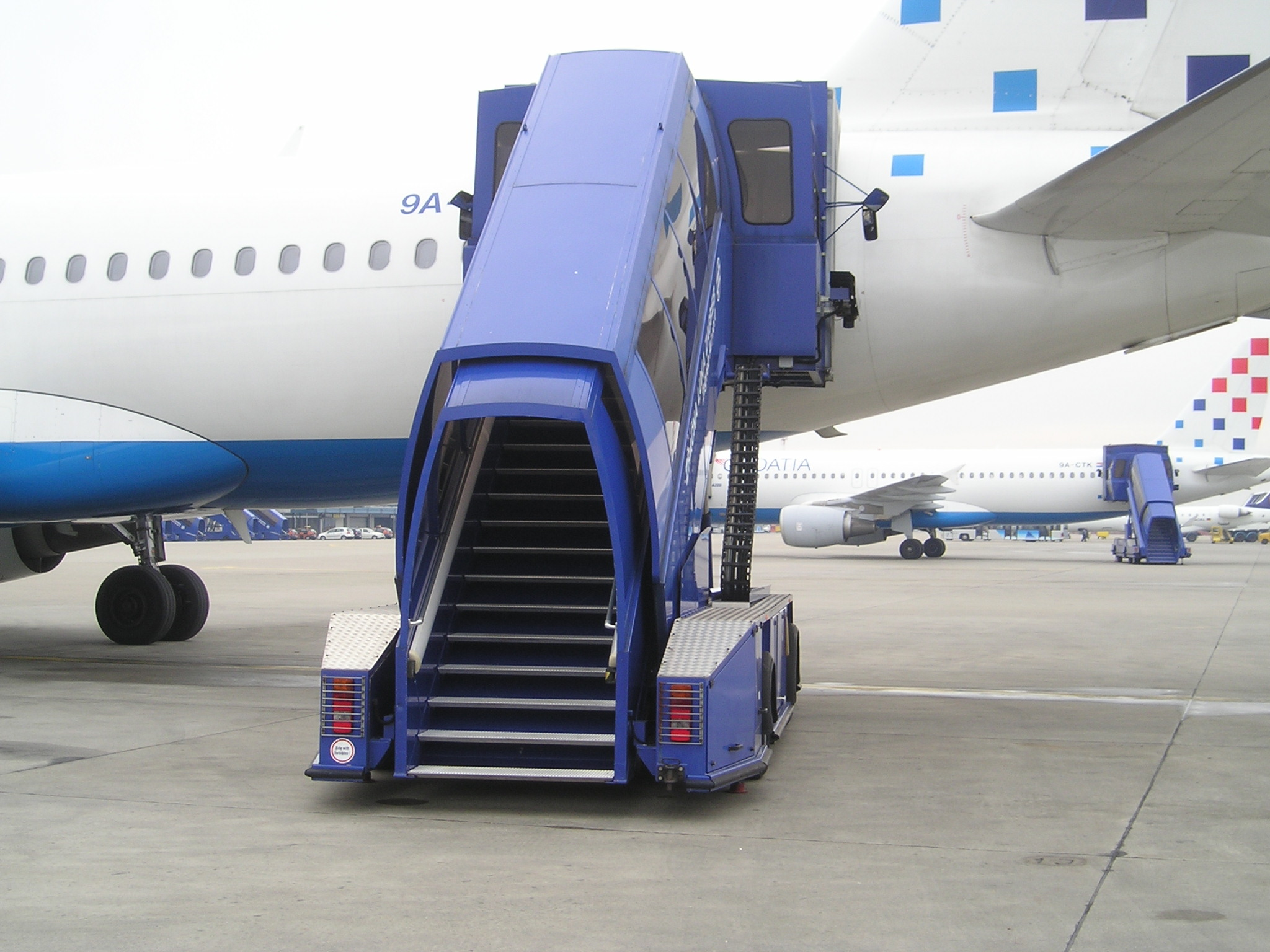
Passenger boarding stairs

Boarding stairs, sometimes called a boarding ramp, or a gangway in the case of ships, are devices, designed to safety standards, which passengers and crew use to board a ship or an aircraft when no built-in stairs are available. Larger aircraft may use one or more jet bridges attached to the terminal building for passenger boarding, but boarding stairs are used when these are not available or it is impractical or too expensive to use them.

== Description ==
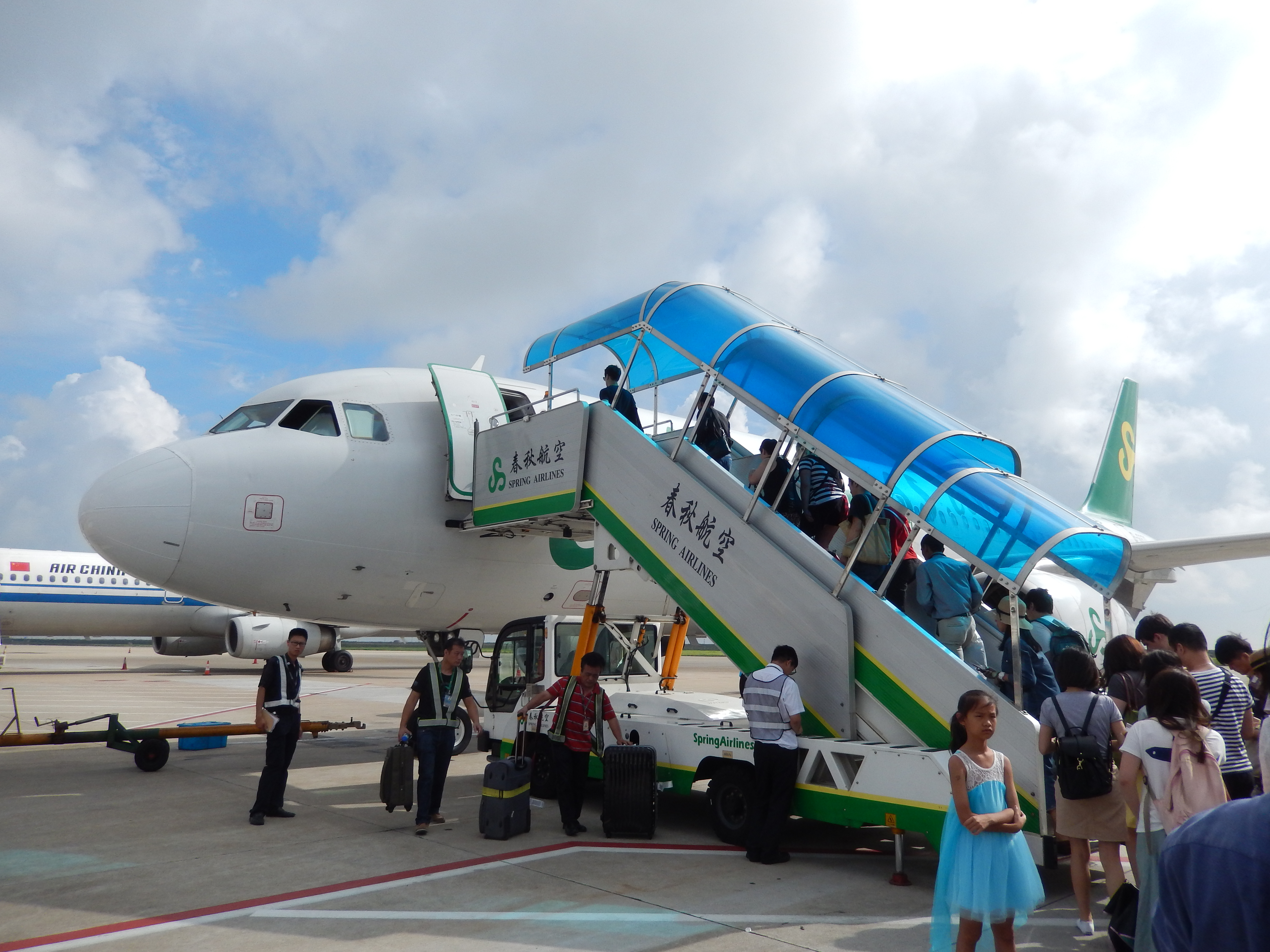
Boarding stairs with canopy

Boarding stairs must be robust and stable, capable of withstanding adverse weather conditions. They are designed to adapt to the curved shape of the aircraft fuselage to which they must be attached, and to be able to raise and lower them to adjust the upper platform to the height of the aircraft, allowing passengers get on and off from the ground to the aircraft door, thus providing a comfortable and safe way for boarding and disembarking, which is part of the airport infrastructure.

They are generally mobile stairs, attached to a chassis that is equipped with wheels in order to move them. They can occasionally be pushed by hand, but usually they are pulled by tractors or are self-propelled, being permanently mounted on a specialized vehicle, a pseudo-van, with an electric or gasoline engine, which transports the stairs around the airport and places them attached to the side of the aeroplane door.

Smaller units are generally moved by being towed or pushed, while larger units are self-propelled. Optional features may include canopies, heating, supplemental lighting and a red carpet for VIP passengers; most models have a handrail for added safety. As larger aircraft have door thresholds between about 1.5 m and 6 m (5 ft to 20 ft) off the ground, boarding stairs make it easier for passengers to get on and off comfortably by providing a secure connection between the aircraft doors and the ground, following the rules stipulated by the "Dynamic Regulation System"

== Ship's boarding stairs ==
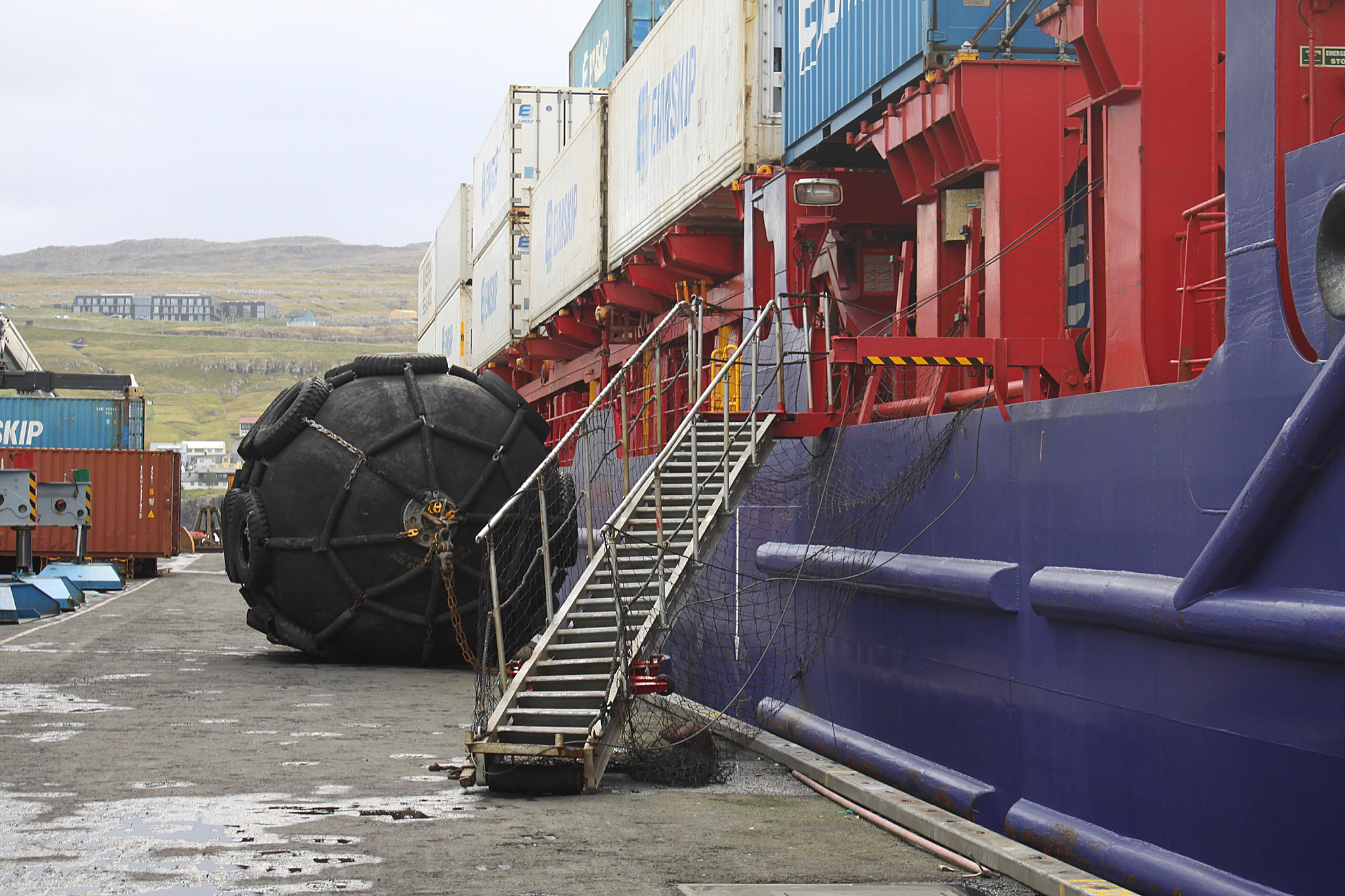
Ship's boarding stairs

There is also a type of boarding stairs for ships or yachts, known as a gangway, which provide safe access between the dock or auxiliary boats and the ship. In the case of a yacht, the choice of the most suitable type of boarding ladder will depend on the size of the yacht, the space available on the dock, etc.

There are different types of boarding stairs:

- Telescopic boarding stairs: These ladders extend and retract as needed. They are ideal for yachts with different deck heights. They can be manual or electric.
- Fixed walkway ladders: These ladders are permanently attached to the yacht and deploy towards the dock. They are robust and durable, but require storage space on board.
- Folding gangway ladders: These are similar to telescoping ladders, but they fold instead of extending. They are compact and easy to store.
- Rotating boarding stairs: These stairs can be rotated in different directions to suit the position of the yacht in the dock. They are versatile and useful in small spaces.
- Hydraulic gangway ladders: They operate with hydraulic systems and can extend and retract automatically. They are convenient and often found on luxury yachts.
- Carbon or fiberglass walkway ladders: These ladders are lightweight and strong. They are popular on modern yachts due to their elegant design and ease of use.

== Gallery ==
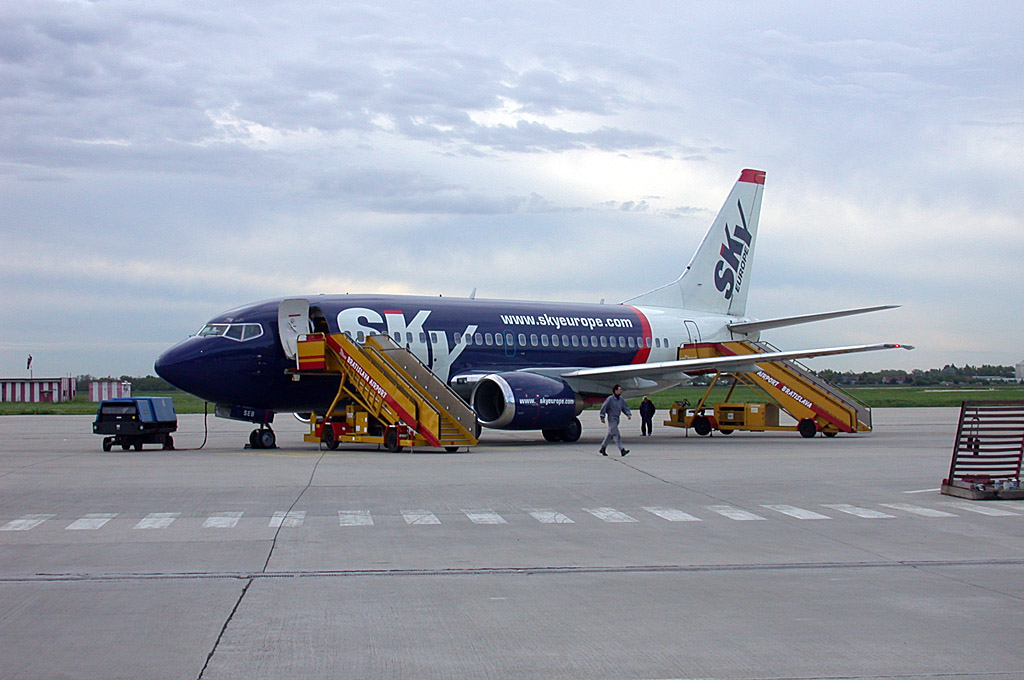
Mobile boarding stairs, open without a roof

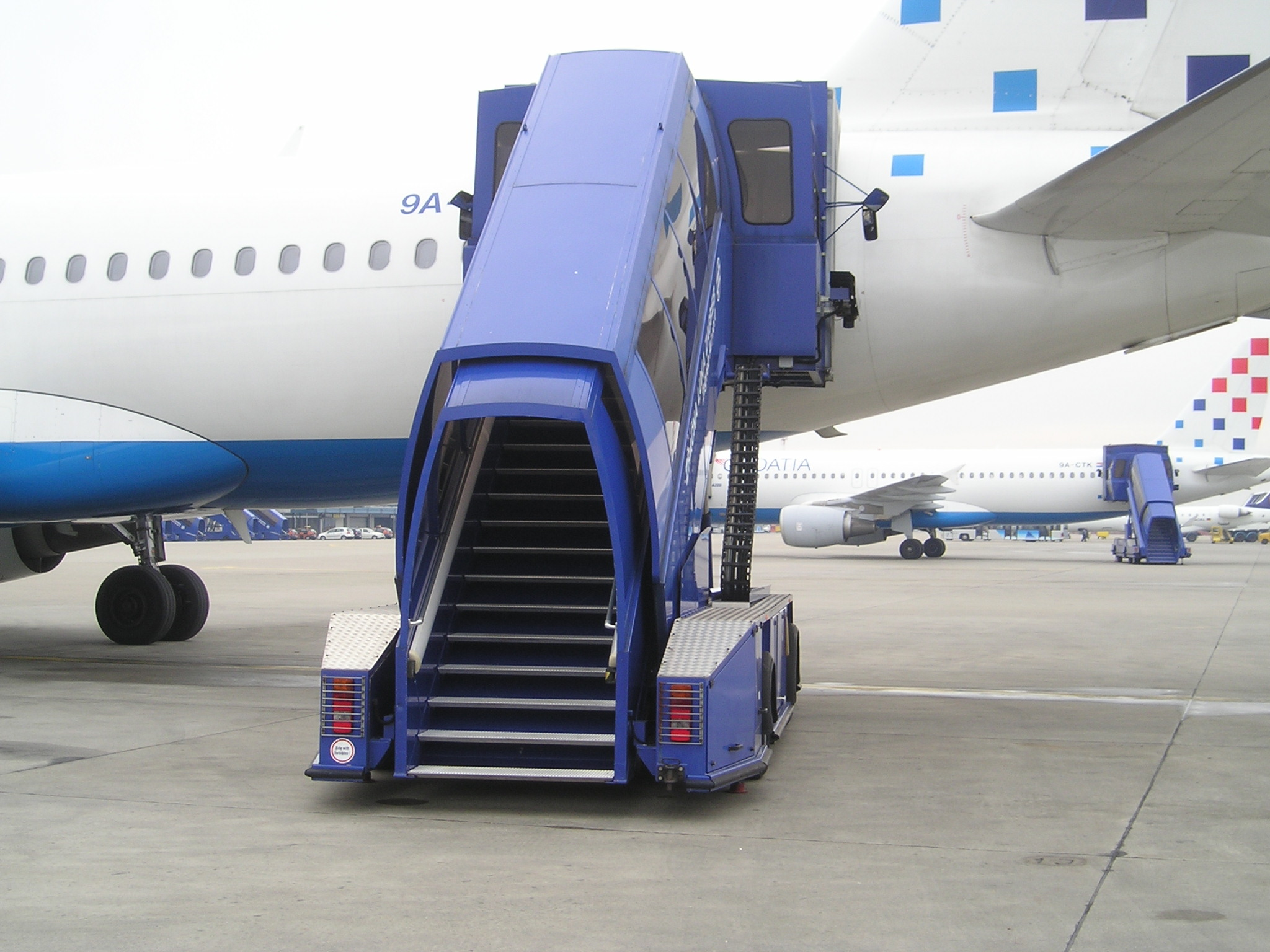
Mobile boarding stairs, covered with a roof

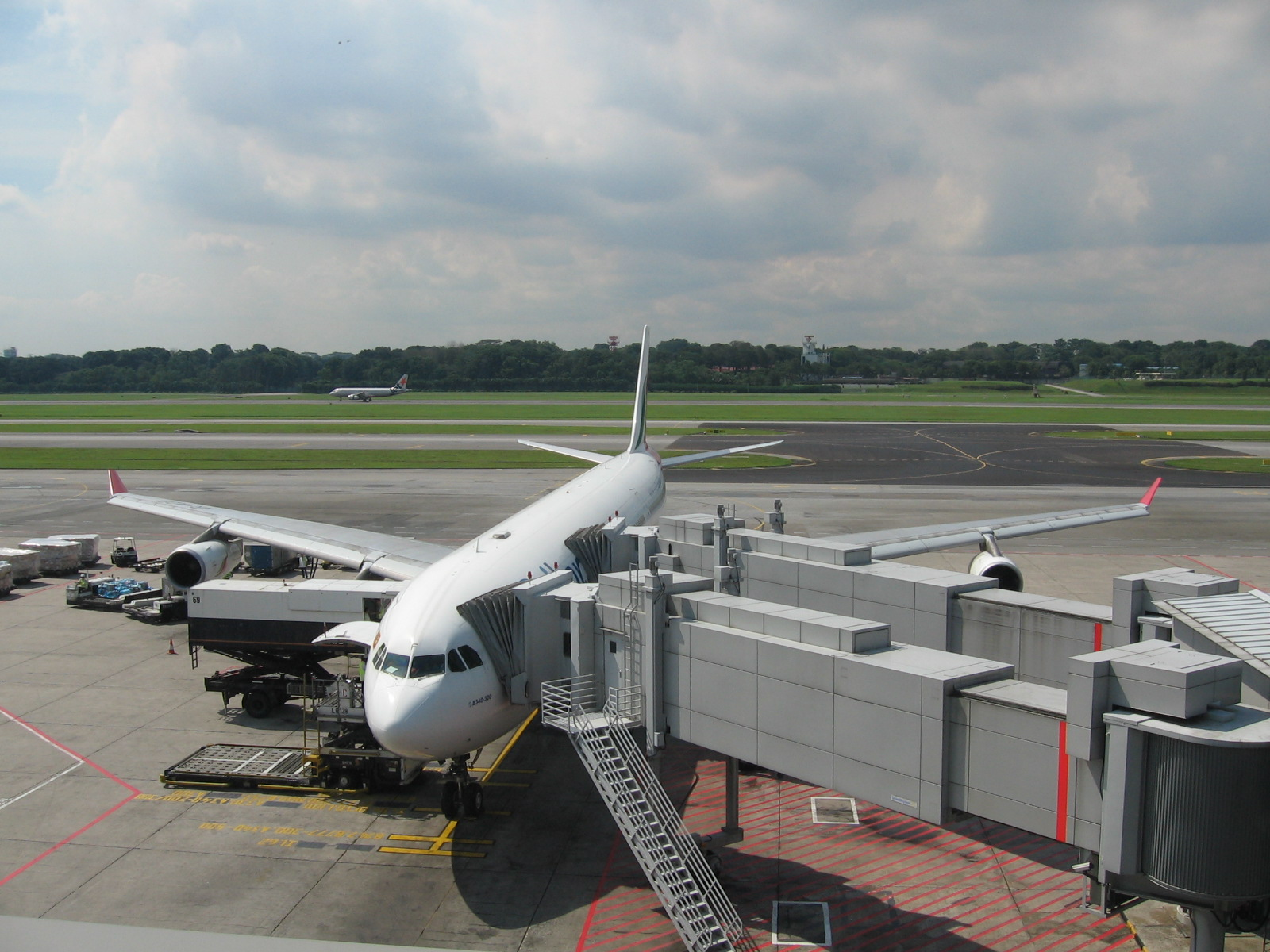
Two passenger jet bridges

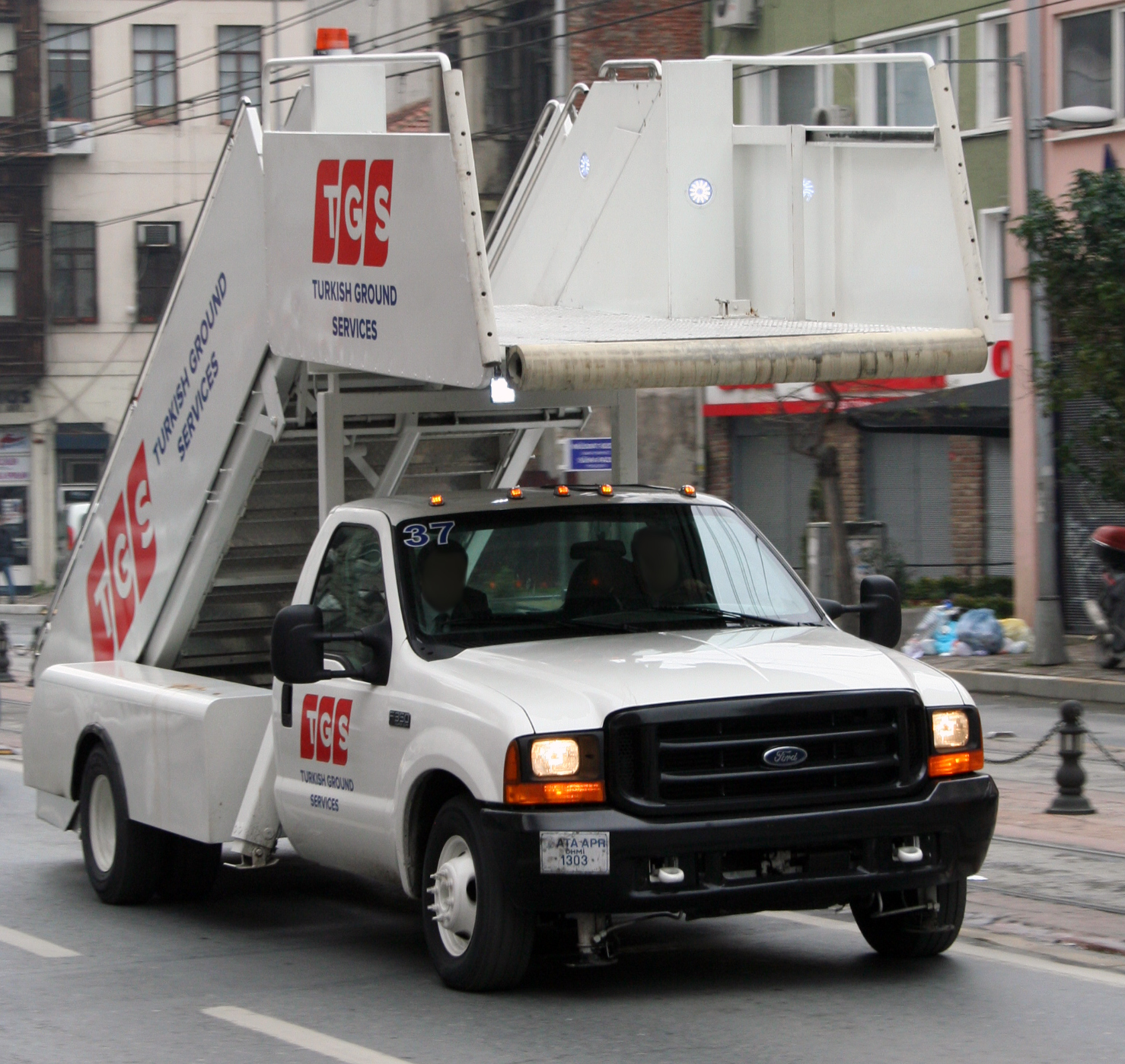
A type often called a stair car or staircar (front view)

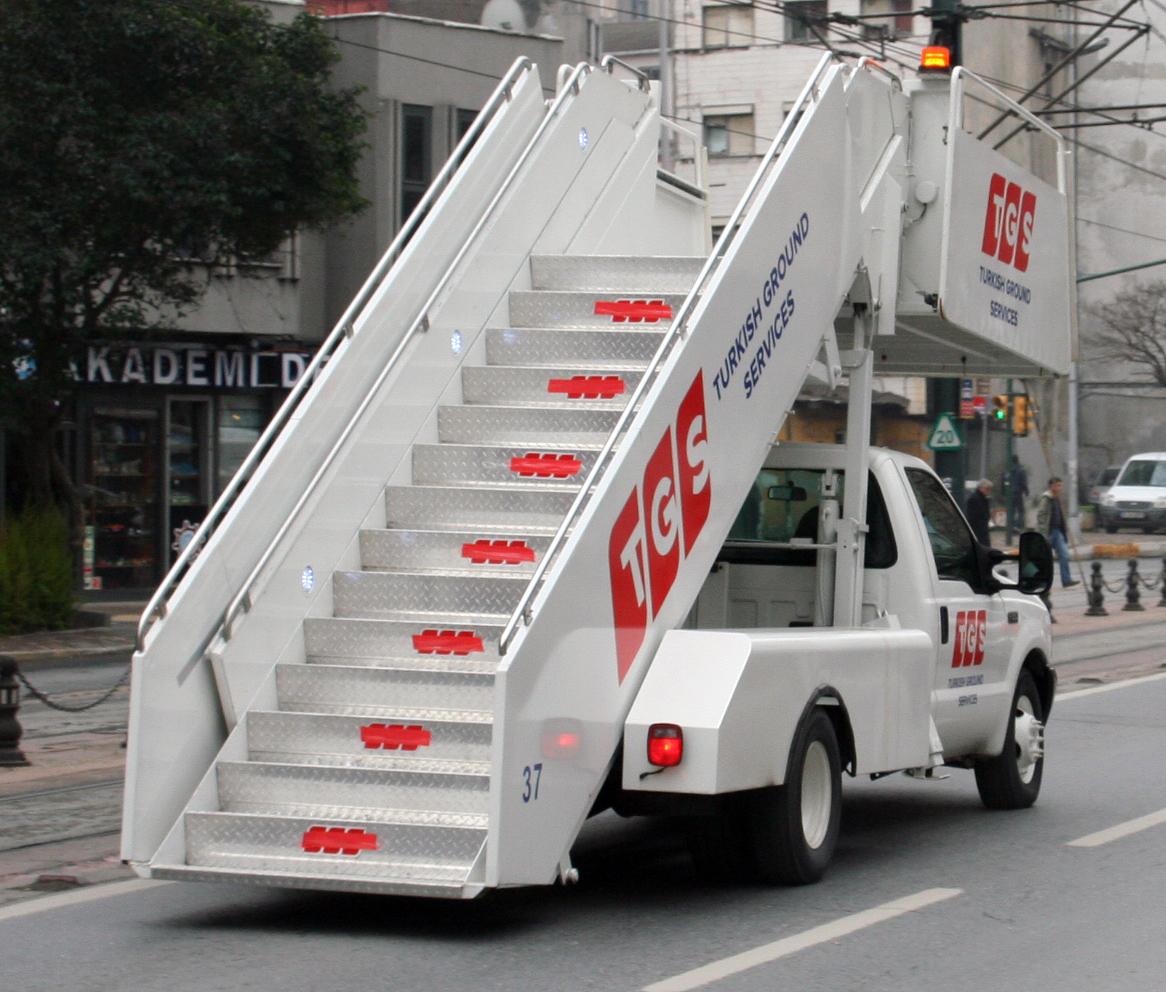
A type often called a stair car or staircar (rear view)

== See also ==
- AERO Specialties
- Aircraft ground handling
- Airline service trolley
- Air-start system
- Arrested Development
- Bag ramp
- Baggage tug
- Charging station
- Electric cart
- Electric truck
- Hydraulics International, INC.
- Non-road engine
- Pushback (aviation)
- Visual Guidance Docking Systems (VGDS)
- Ground support equipment
