= AERO Specialties =

AERO Specialties, Inc.
- Company type: Private
- Industry: Aviation - Civil and Military
- Founded: 1987
- Headquarters: Boise, Idaho, United States
- Area served: International
- Products: Ground Support Equipment (GSE); Air Start Unit; Baggage Carts; Beltloaders; Cargo Handling; Deice Units; Ground Power Units; Hydraulic Power Units; Lavatory Service Carts; Maintenance Stands; Nitrogen Service Carts; Oxygen Service Carts; Passenger Stairs; Potable Water Service Carts; Towbar Systems; Tugs, Tow Tractors, Pushbacks; Used GSE
- Website: aerospecialties.com

AERO Specialties, Inc. is a manufacturer and international distributor of new and refurbished aircraft ground support equipment (GSE). AERO Specialties was founded in 1987 by President Matt Sheehan to supply GSE products to corporate, fixed-base operator (FBO), commercial, military, and general aviation customers globally. AERO Specialties manufactures aircraft diesel-electric hybrid ground power units (GPUs), lavatory, potable water, cleaning, and oxygen/nitrogen servicing carts, as well as aircraft towbars and heads. AERO Specialties is an authorized U.S. distributor for TLD, Clyde Machines, Powervamp, LiftSafe, and more.

AERO Specialties has experienced significant international growth due to the expansion of its CE marked product line for the European Economic Area, which was introduced in 2006. Exclusive international distribution agreements with various international companies have contributed to an increased global distribution network for AERO Specialties. An estimated 30 to 40 percent of AERO's business is related to exporting.

In December 2010, AERO Specialties acquired Australia-based JetGo International, a diesel-electric hybrid GPU manufacturer. JetGo is now manufactured and sold under the AERO brand. In 2016, AERO Specialties released a line of portable DC GPUs in collaboration with Powervamp, as well as becoming the company's exclusive distributor in North America. In 2017 AERO Specialties released into the US market, Powervamp's 400 Hz AC solid-state aircraft rectifiers and frequency converters branded with AERO Specialties orange and blue colours.

AERO Specialties supplies equipment to the United States Government via the General Services Administration under GSA Contract Number GS-30F-0030X.

== Services ==
In addition to supplying new and used GSE, AERO Specialties maintains and repairs GSE for clients. Equipment can be refurbished or zero-timed.

AERO Specialties regularly rents and leases GSE for specific purposes or special events.

== Events ==
AERO Specialties provided GSE to all FBOs (Avitat, Landmark Aviation, and Million Air) at Vancouver International Airport (YVR) during the 2010 Vancouver Winter Olympics to meet increased aircraft traffic demands from athletes, fans and organizers. AERO Specialties supplied approximately 40 pieces of equipment including Eagle TT-series pushback tractors, TLD and JetGo GPUs, and AERO brand towbars, towbar heads, lavatory and potable water carts.

AERO Specialties regularly supplies equipment used at events hosted by the NBAA & CBAA (Canadian Business Aviation Association).

AERO Specialties supplied GSE to FBOs for the First inauguration of Barack Obama and 2009 Super Bowl. AERO Specialties regularly supplies equipment to sporting events such as the Masters, the World Series & NASCAR races. They have also supplied equipment for major events & festivals such as the Sundance Film Festival.

== Awards ==
In 2016, AERO Specialties was awarded the President's "E" Award For Exports. The award, presented by U.S. Secretary of Commerce Penny Pritzker, is the highest recognition any U.S. entity can receive for making a significant contribution to the expansion of U.S. Exports.

In 2015, owner Matthew Sheehan was named Ground Support Worldwide's Team Leader of The Year at the annual GSE Expo Worldwide in Las Vegas, Nevada. The award honors an "individual who has taken a leadership role with personnel."

AERO Specialties received the U.S. Department of Commerce Small Business Association (SBA) Northwest regional exporter award on May 4, 2011. This honor came in addition to being recognized as the SBA exporter of the year in Idaho.

On May 6, 2009, in honor of World Trade Day, AERO Specialties was awarded the U.S. Department of Commerce Commercial Service Export Achievement Certificate for recent accomplishments in the global marketplace, presented by the Idaho Export Council.

The Boise Metro Chamber of Commerce awarded AERO Specialties its Small Business of the Year award in June 2002.
