= Hydraulics International =

Defense industry company in California

Hydraulics International, INC.
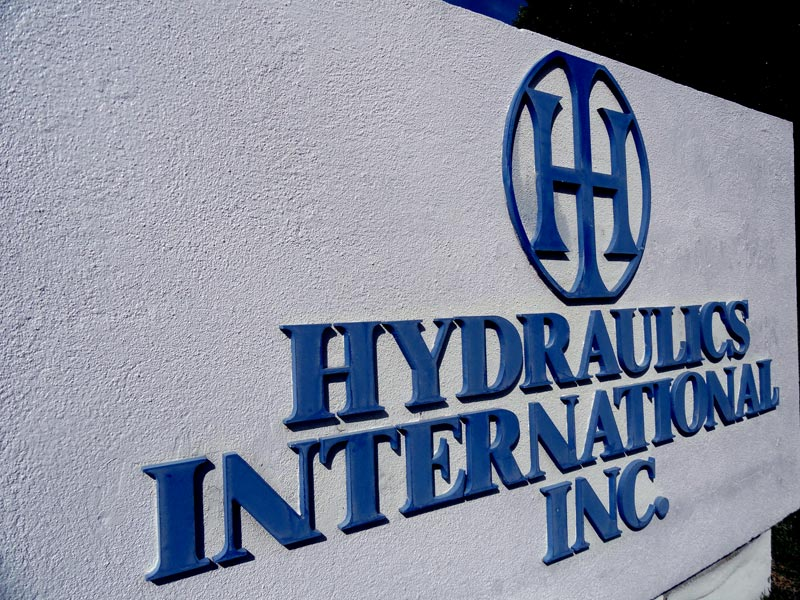
- Company type: Private
- Industry: Aviation and Defense
- Founded: 1976
- Headquarters: Chatsworth, Los Angeles, California, U.S.
- Area served: International
- Products: Defense GSE Equipments Ammunition Loading Systems; Aircraft Hydraulic System Testing; Aircraft Cabin Pressure Testing; Power Systems; Environmental Control Systems; Military Trailers; High Pressure Gas and Liquid systems Flowmeters Integrated Logistics
- Website: hiinet.com

Hydraulics International, Inc., known as HII headquartered in Chatsworth, California, U.S., is a supplier of defense products, services and support to military forces, aviation and commercial industries, Government agencies and prime contractors. The company develops manufactures and supports systems for over one hundred industries as well as mission critical and military sustainment requirements.

HII manufactures defense ground support equipment including ammunition loading systems, aircraft hydraulic system testing, aircraft cabin pressure testing, power systems, environmental control systems, military trailers, high pressure gas and liquid systems, flow measuring equipment, and logistics and support services.

The corporate, engineering and manufacturing facilities, located in Chatsworth, CA and Forsyth, GA, encompass over 625,000 square feet (58,100 m^{2}).

== History ==
In October 2020, HII received the President's "E" Award, having exported to over 25 countries. In November 2025, HII challenged the U.S. Army’s decision to award sole-contracts to Sun Test Systems, Inc. The U.S. Court of Federal Claims dismissed the protest, despite conceding that the Army did not conduct thorough market research. In February 2026, the company was acquired by private equity firm Arcline Investment Management.
