= Ground support equipment =

Equipment for servicing aircraft between flights

Time-lapse of ground support equipment in use at Osaka International Airport, Osaka, Japan

Ground support equipment (GSE) is the support equipment found at an airport, usually on the apron, the servicing area by the terminal. This equipment is used to service the aircraft between flights. As the name suggests, ground support equipment is there to support the operations of aircraft whilst on the ground. The role of this equipment generally involves ground power operations, aircraft mobility, and cargo/passenger loading operations.

Many airlines subcontract ground handling to an airport or a handling agent, or even to another airline. Ground handling addresses the many service requirements of a passenger aircraft between the time it arrives at a terminal gate and the time it departs for its next flight. Speed, efficiency, and accuracy are important in ground handling services in order to minimize the turnaround time (the time during which the aircraft remains parked at the gate).

Small airlines sometimes subcontract maintenance to a larger carrier, as it may be a better alternative to setting up an independent maintenance base. Some airlines may enter into a Maintenance and Ground Support Agreement (MAGSA) with each other, which is used by airlines to assess costs for maintenance and support to aircraft.

Most ground services are not directly related to the actual flying of the aircraft, and instead involve other service tasks. Cabin services ensure passenger comfort and safety. They include such tasks as cleaning the passenger cabin and replenishment of on-board consumables or washable items such as soap, pillows, tissues, blankets, and magazines. Security checks are also made to make sure no threats have been left on the aircraft. Airport GSE comprises a diverse range of vehicles and equipment necessary to service aircraft during passenger and cargo loading and unloading, maintenance, and other ground-based operations. The wide range of activities associated with aircraft ground operations lead to an equally wide-ranging fleet of GSE. For example, activities undertaken during a typical aircraft gate period include: cargo loading and unloading, passenger loading and unloading, potable water storage, lavatory waste tank drainage, aircraft refueling, engine and fuselage examination and maintenance, and food and beverage catering. Airlines employ specially designed GSE to support all these operations. Moreover, electrical power and conditioned air are generally required throughout gate operational periods for both passenger and crew comfort and safety, and many times these services are also provided by GSE.

== Non-powered equipment ==
=== Dollies ===
Dollies are used for the transportation of loose baggages, oversized bags, mail bags, loose cargo carton boxes, etc. between the aircraft and the terminal or sorting facility. Dollies for loose baggage are fitted with a brake system which blocks the wheels from moving when the connecting rod is not attached to a tug. Most dollies for loose baggage are completely enclosed except for the sides which use plastic curtains to protect items from weather. In the US, these dollies are called Baggage Cart, but in Europe Baggage Cart means passenger baggage trolleys.

==== Gallery ====
Airport dolly gallery

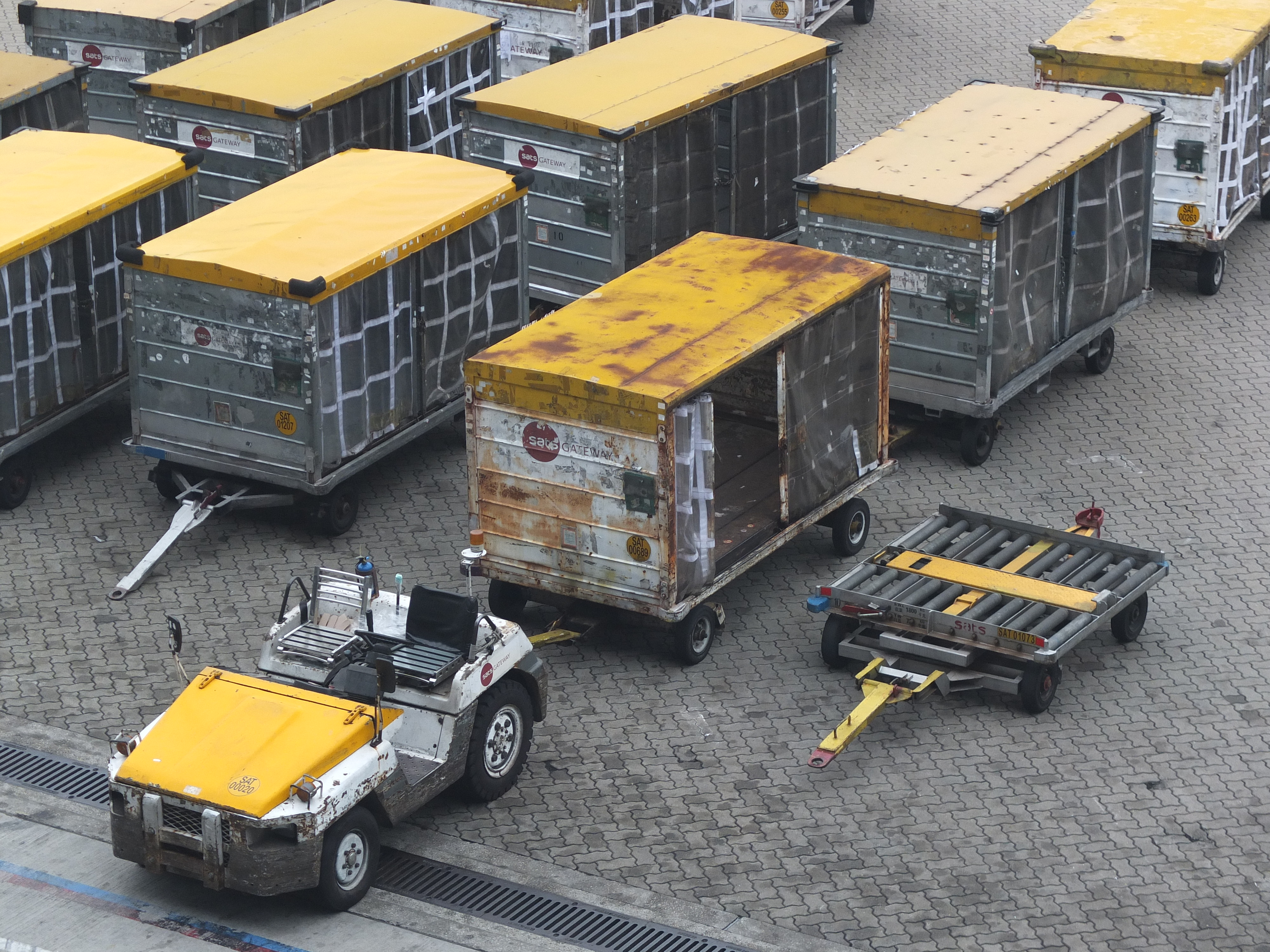
A single dolly for an aircraft cargo Unit Load Device, next to a group of dollies for loose luggage.

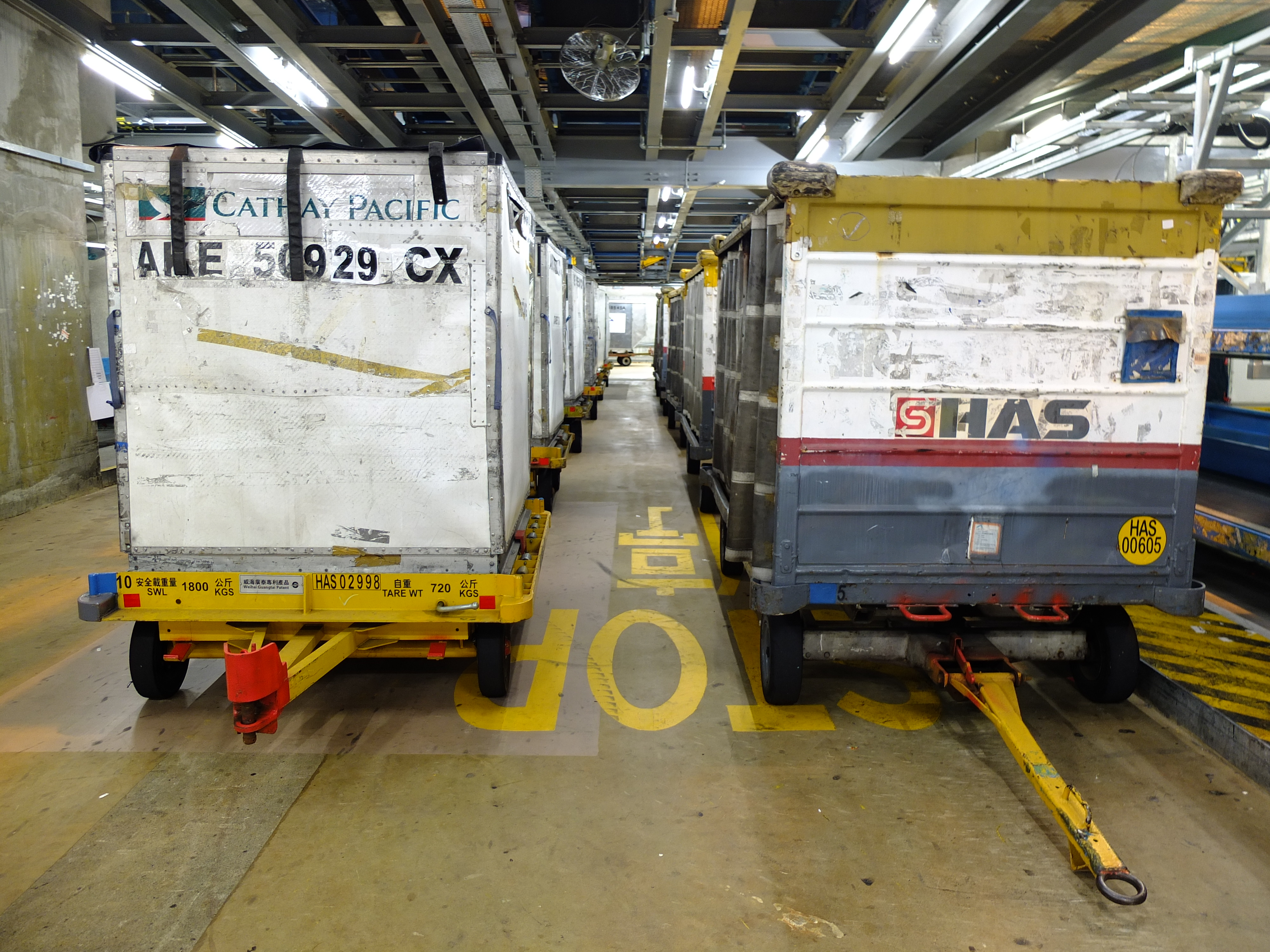
Those on the left are dollies from Cathay Pacific for baggage unit load devices (ULDs). Those on the right are dollies for loose baggage.

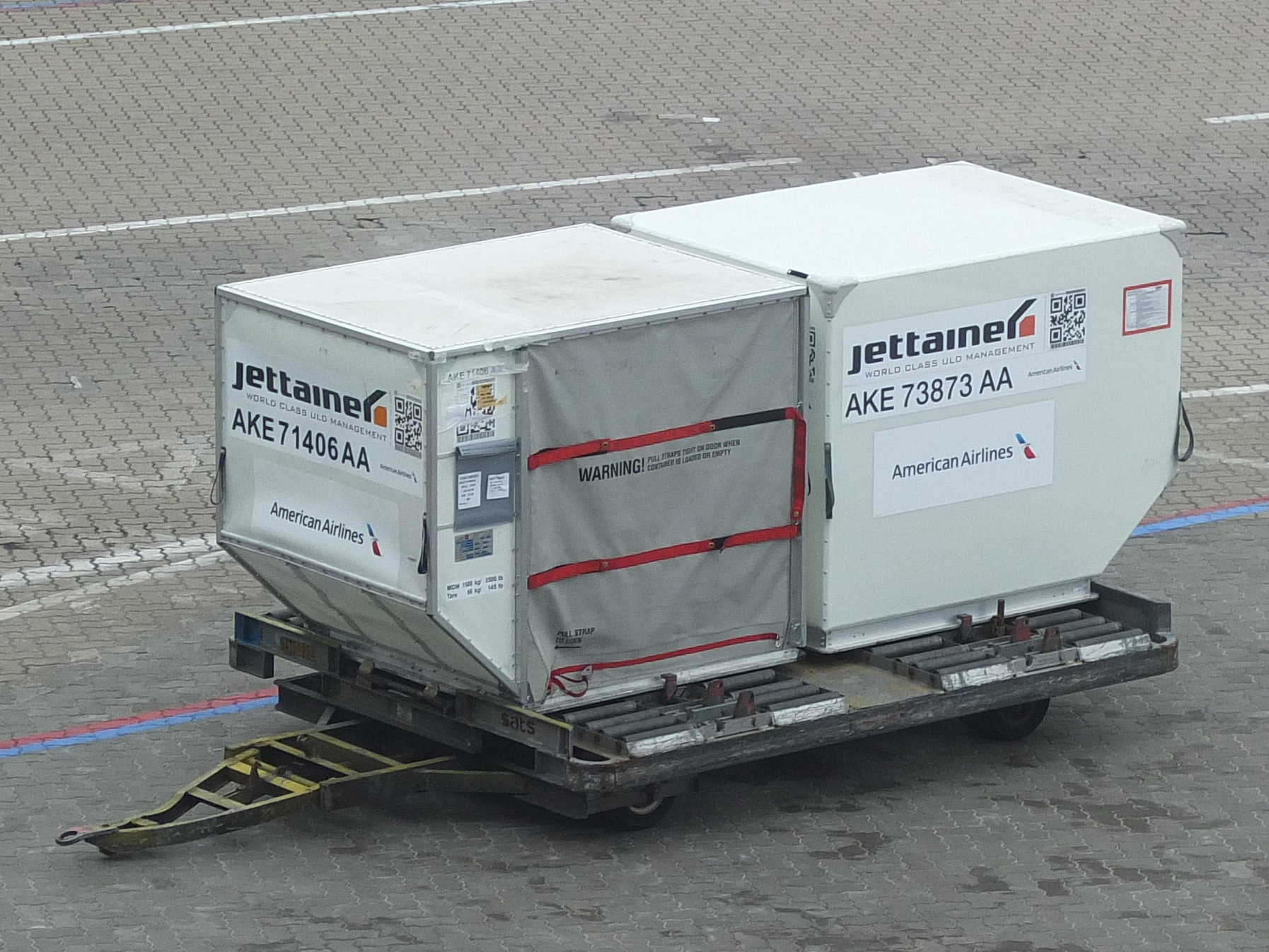
A large dolly holding two aircraft cargo Unit Load Devices for American Airlines.

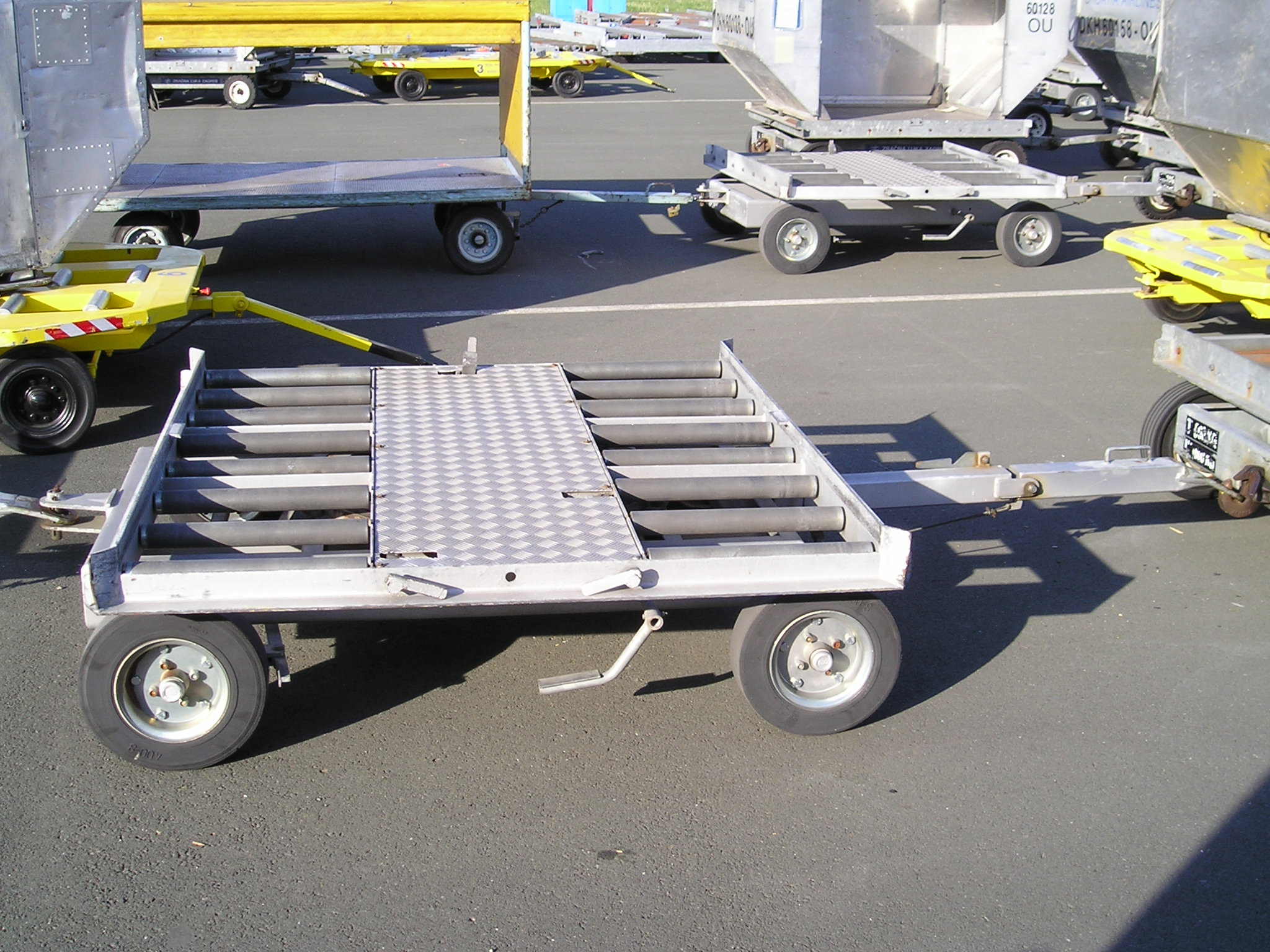
Dolly for unit load devices

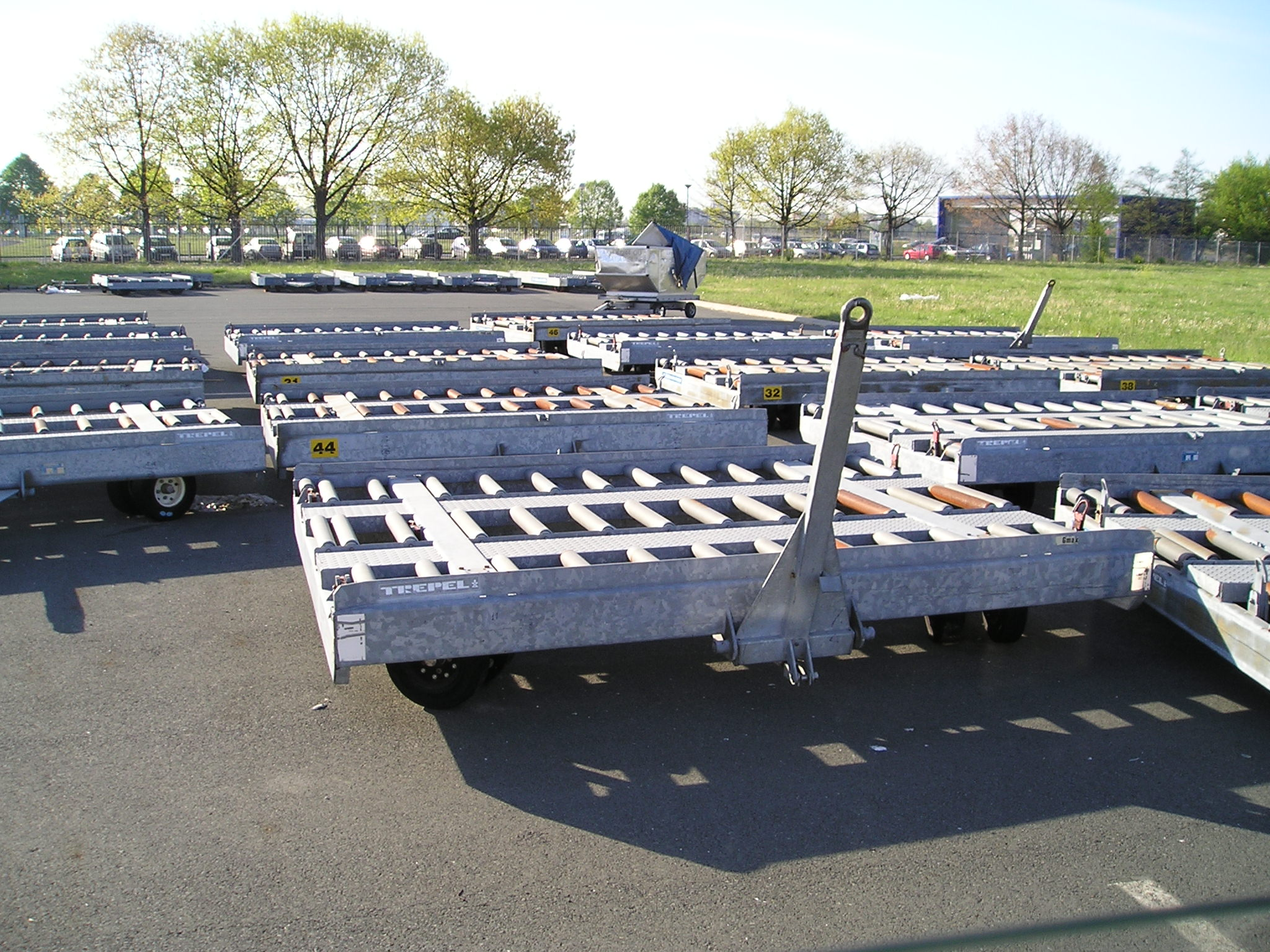
Dolly for cargo pallets

=== Chocks ===
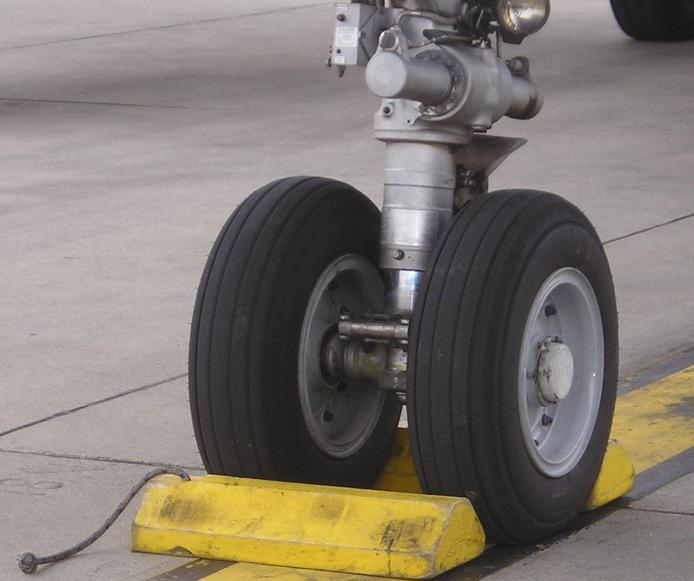
Chocks

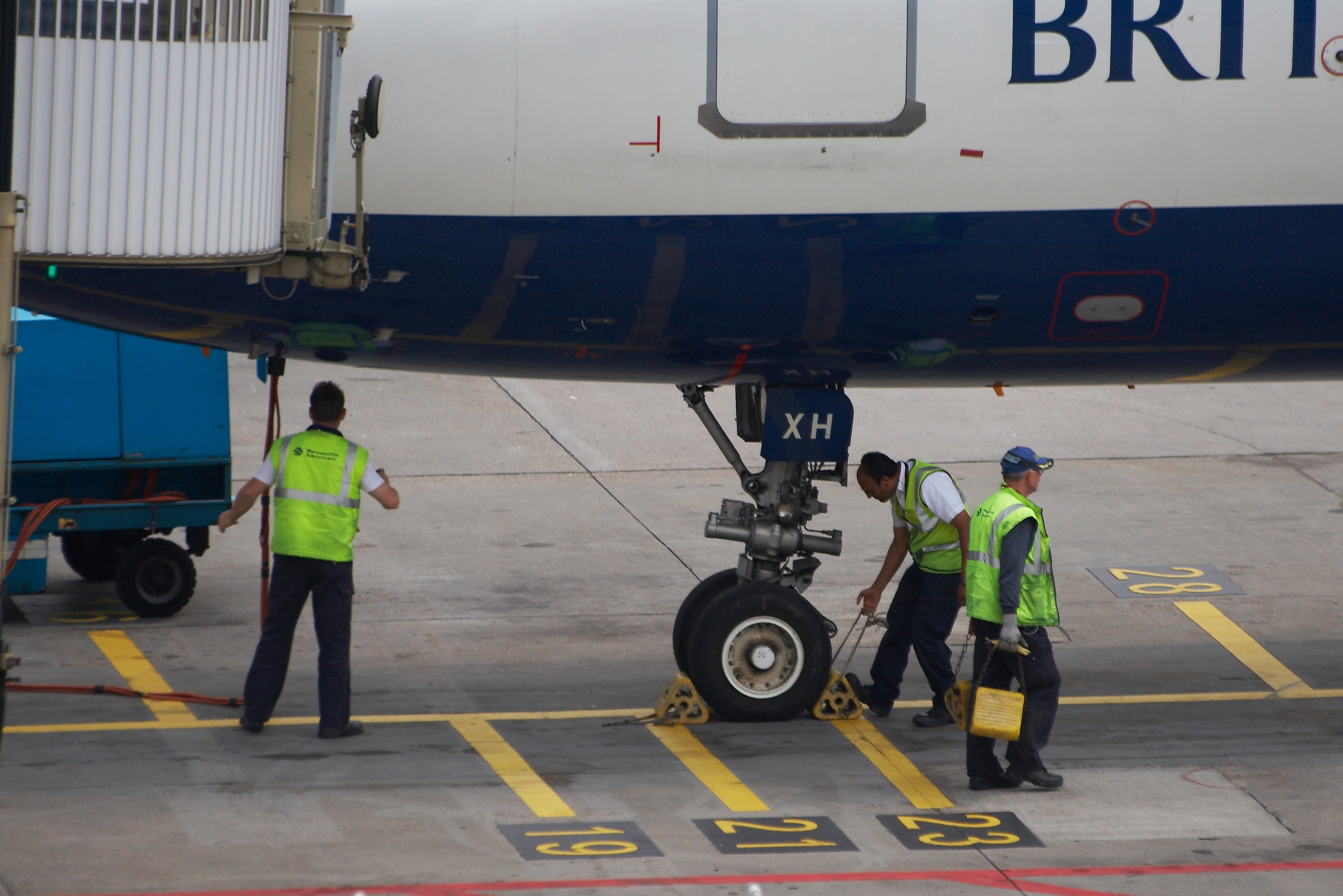
Chocks being fitted to a British Airways Airbus A321

Chocks are used to prevent an aircraft from moving while parked at the gate or in a hangar. Chocks are placed in the front ('fore') and back ('aft') of the wheels of landing gear. They are made out of hard wood or hard rubber. Corporate safety guidelines in the US almost always specify that chocks must be used in a pair on the same wheel and they must be placed in physical contact with the wheel. Therefore, "chocks" are typically found in pairs connected by a segment of rope or cable. The word "chock" is also used as a verb, defined as the act of placing chocks in front and back of the wheel.

=== Aircraft tripod jack ===
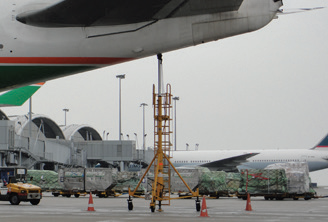
Aircraft jack lift used to support the tail of an EVA Air Boeing 747 to avoid the aircraft tail from falling to ground during the cargo loading/unloading activity in which the "tail heavy" situation may occur

They are used to support a parked aircraft to prevent their tail from drooping or even falling to the ground. When the passengers in the front get off an aircraft, the aircraft becomes tail heavy and the tail will droop. Using the jack is optional but not all aircraft need it. When needed, they are tugged to the tail and set up by manpower. Once set up, no supervision to the jack is needed until the aircraft is ready to leave.

=== Aircraft service stairs ===
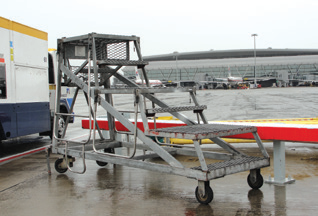
Aircraft service stairs helps the maintenance technician to reach the bottom of aircraft.

Aircraft service stairs help the maintenance technician to reach the bottom of aircraft.

== Powered equipment ==
=== Refuelers ===
Aircraft refuelers can be either a self-contained fuel truck, or a hydrant truck/cart (this variant sometimes called servicer). Fuel trucks are self-contained, typically containing up to 57,000 litres (15,000 US gal; 13,000 imp gal) of fuel and have their own pumps, filters, hoses, and other equipment. A hydrant cart or truck hooks into a central pipeline network and provides fuel to the aircraft. There is a significant advantage with hydrant systems when compared to fuel trucks, as fuel trucks must be periodically replenished.

Refueler gallery

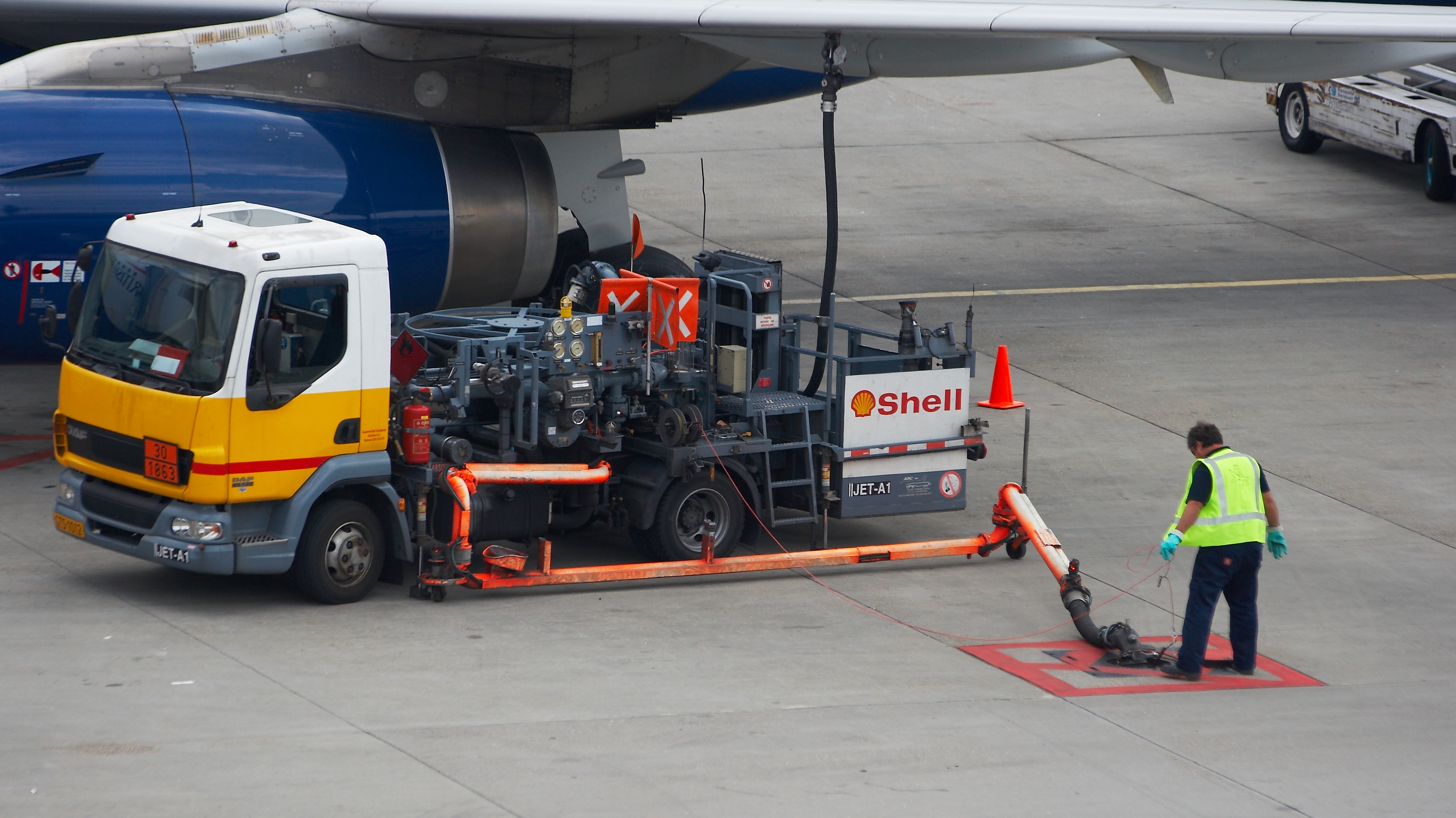
Hydrant truck aircraft refueler

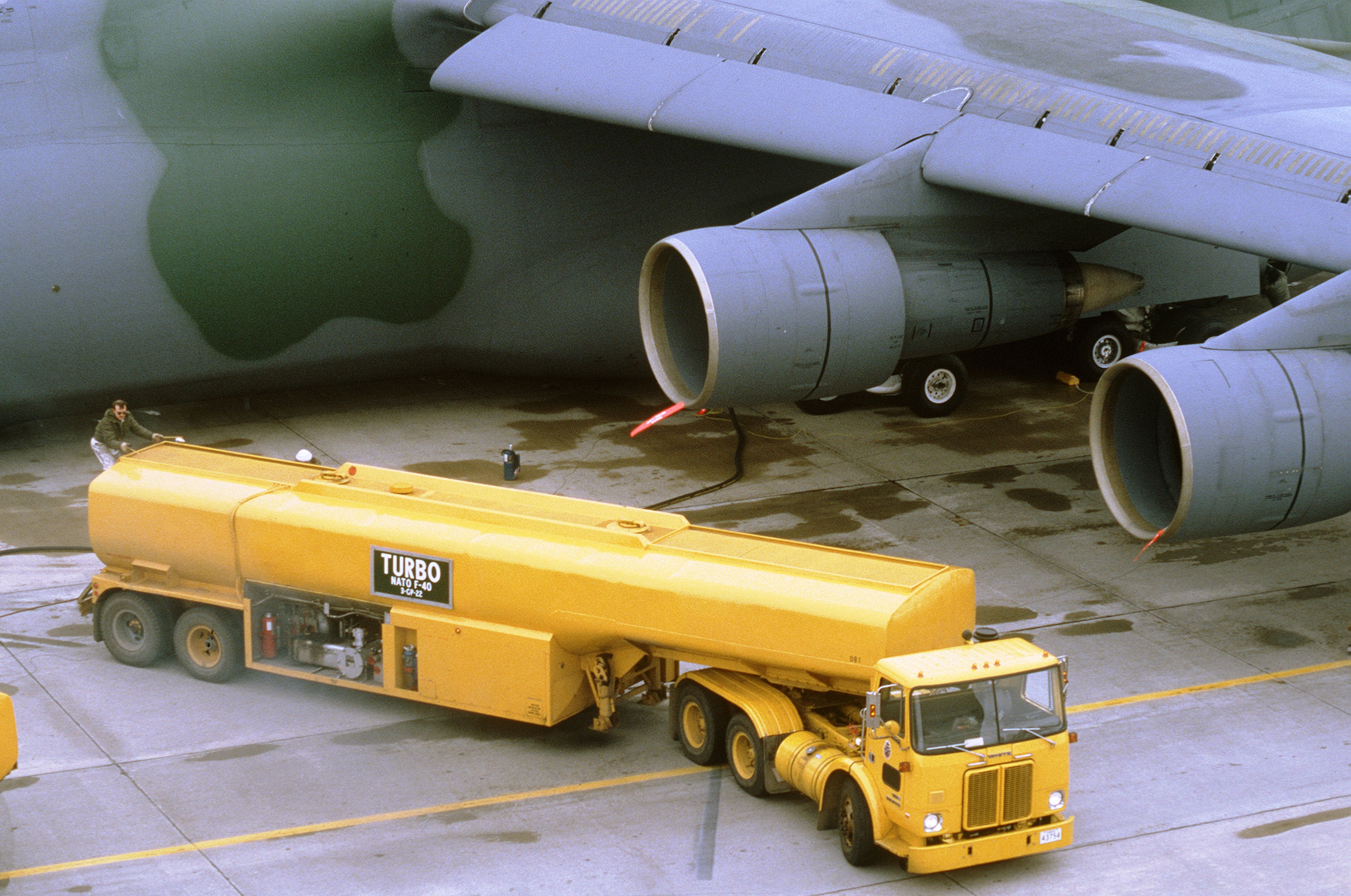
Tank truck aircraft refueler

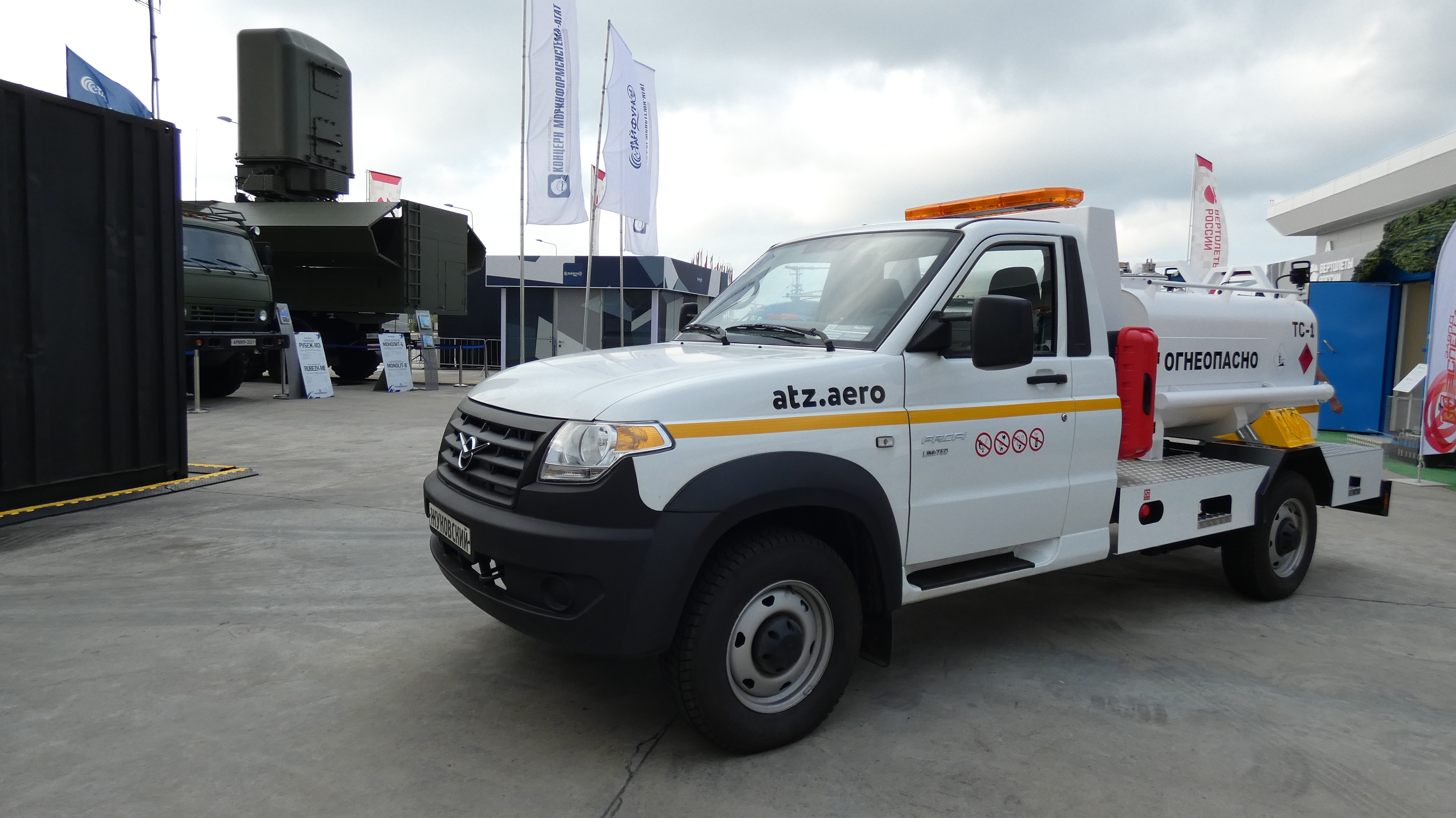
UAZ-23632 based compact tank truck for small airfields

=== Tugs and tractors ===
The tugs and tractors at an airport have several purposes and represent the essential part of ground support services. They are used to move all equipment that can not move itself. This includes bag carts, mobile air conditioning units, air starters, and lavatory carts.

=== Ground power units ===
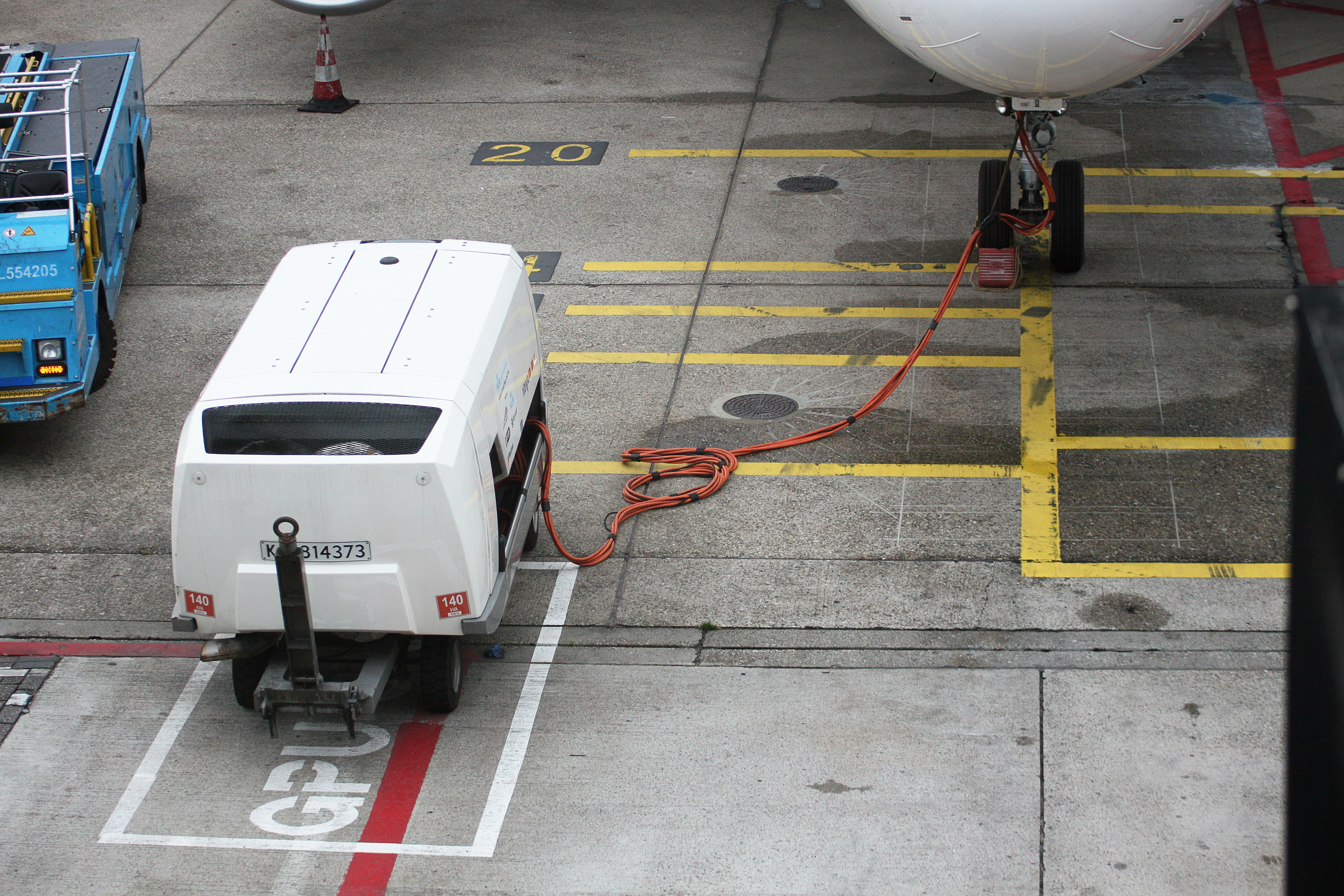
Ground power unit that needs towing

A ground power unit (GPU) is a vehicle capable of supplying power to aircraft parked on the ground. Ground power units may also be built into the jetway, making it even easier to supply electrical power to aircraft. Many aircraft require 28 V of direct current and 115 V 400 Hz of alternating current. The electric energy is carried from a generator to a connection on the aircraft via 3 phase 4-wire insulated cable capable of handling 261 amps (90 kVA). These connectors are standard for all aircraft, as defined in ISO 6858.

A so-called "solid state unit" converts power from AC to DC along with current separation for aircraft power requirements. Solid state units can be supplied stationary, bridge-mounted or as a mobile unit.

=== Buses ===
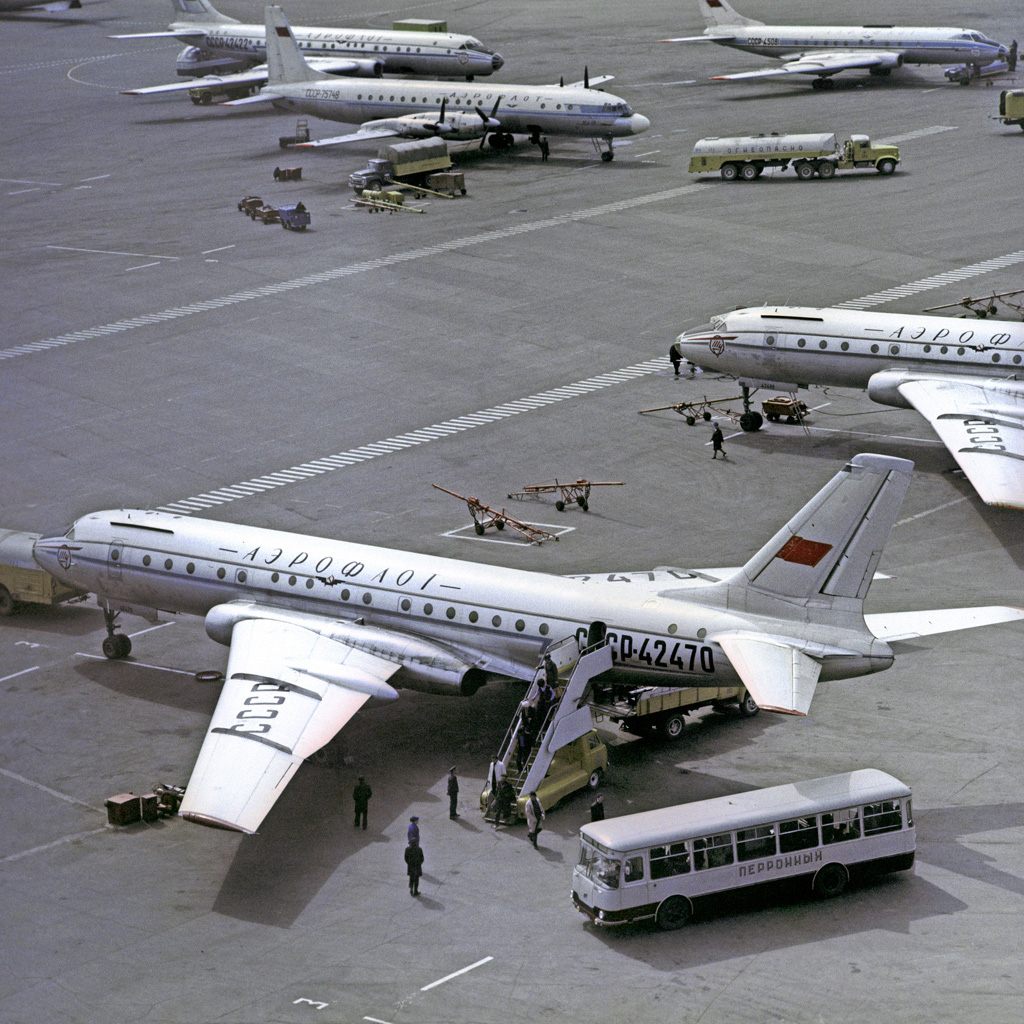
Soviet apron bus

Buses at airports are used to move people from the terminal to either an aircraft or another terminal. The specific term for airport buses that drive on the apron only is apron bus. Apron buses may have a low profile like the Guangtai or Neoplan aircraft buses because people disembark directly to the apron. Some airports use buses that are raised to the level of a passenger terminal and can only be accessed from a door on the 2nd level of the terminal. These odd-looking buses are usually referred to as "people movers" or "mobile lounges". Airport buses are usually normal city buses or specialized terminal buses. Specialized airport buses have very low floor and wide doors on both sides of the bus for most efficient passenger movement and flexibility in depot parking. The biggest producers of airport buses are in China (Weihai, Shenyang, Beijing, Jinhua), Portugal and Slovenia.

=== Container loader ===
Container loaders, also known as cargo loaders or "K loaders", are used for the loading and unloading of containers and pallets into and out of aircraft. The loader has two platforms which raise and descend independently. The containers or pallets on the loader are moved with the help of built-in rollers or wheels. There are different container and pallet loaders.

- 3.5 T
- 7 T (standard version, wide-body, universal, high)
- 14 T
- 30 T

For military transport planes special container and pallet loaders are used. Some military applications use airborne loaders, which are transportable within the transport plane itself. Container and pallet loaders are mainly produced in France, Germany, Latvia, Spain, Canada, Brazil, Japan, China, and the United States.

Container loader gallery

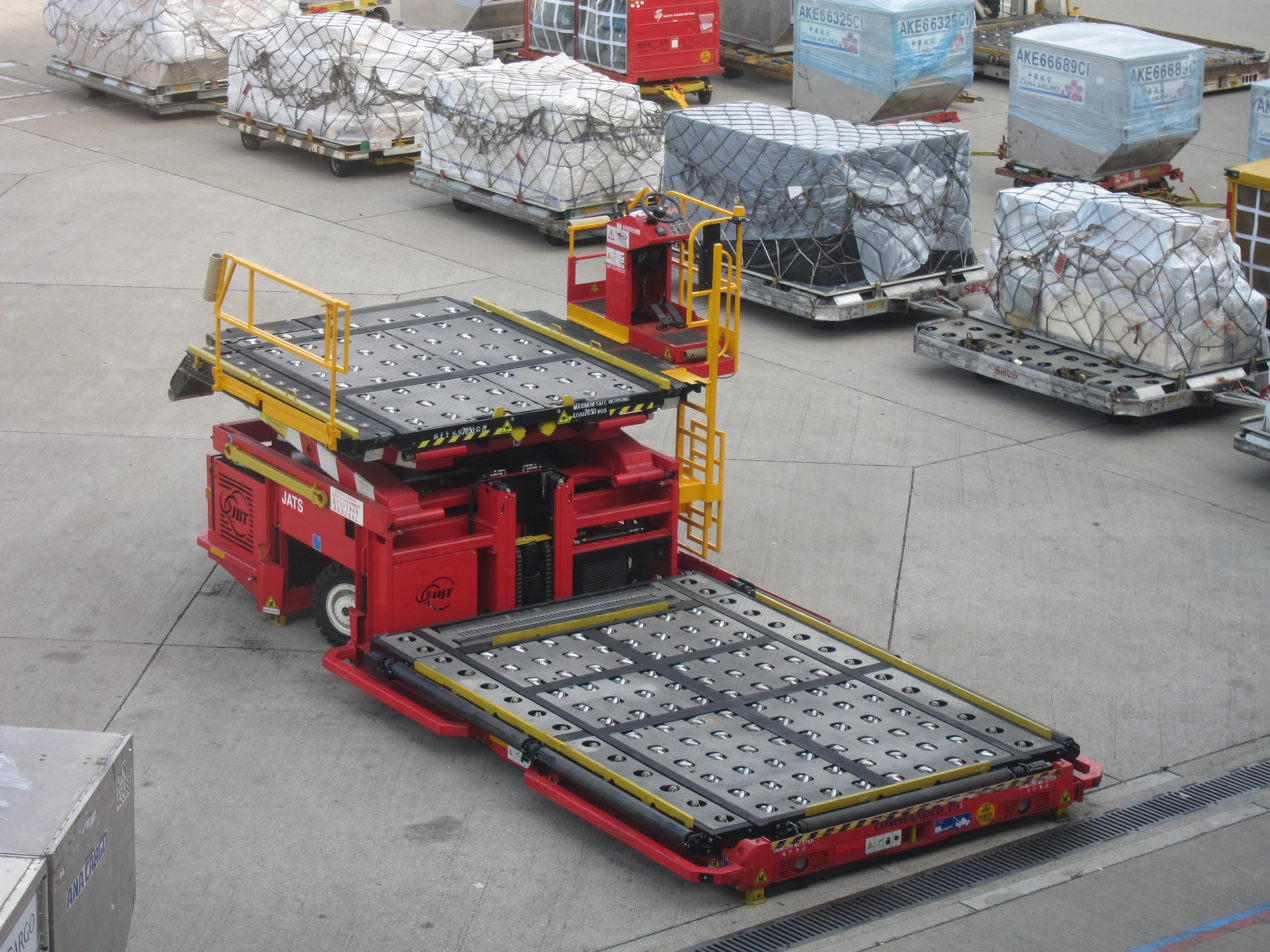
Aircraft container and pallet loader with numerous powered Mecanum wheel for shifting and rotation of containers.

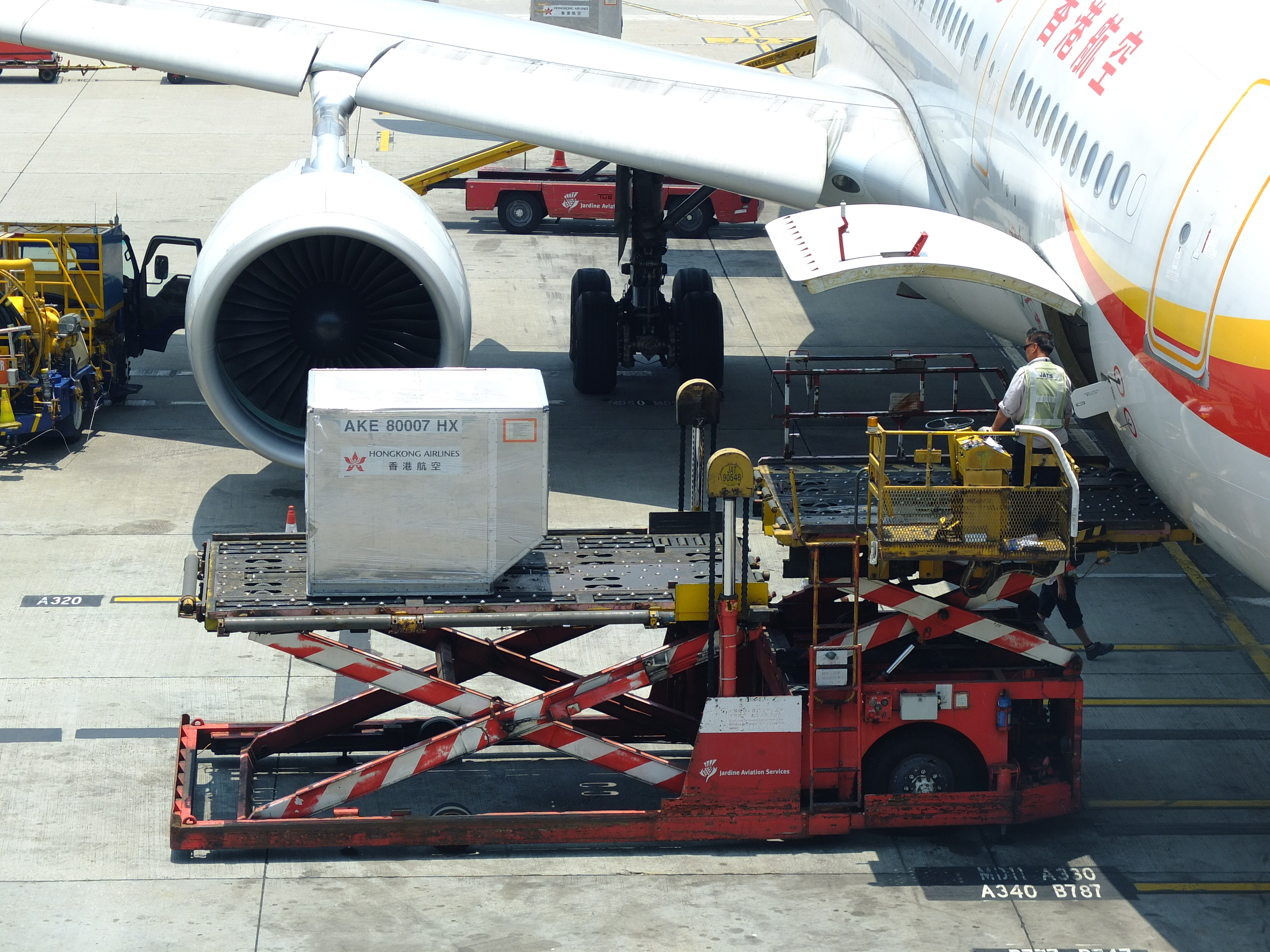
A ULD loader lifting a unit load device (ULD) from apron dollies to an aircraft's cargo bay

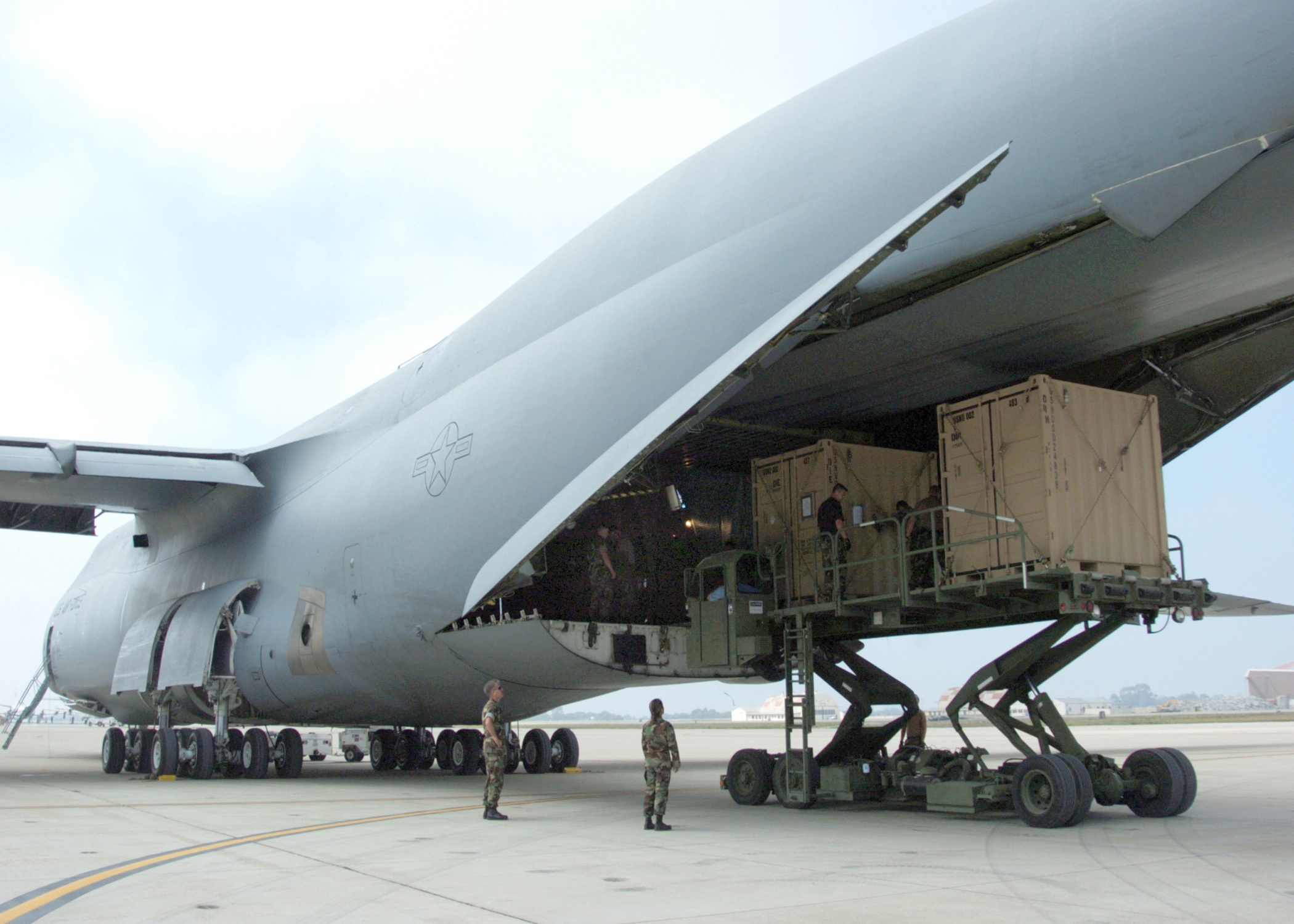
Members of Naval Mobile Construction Battalion Four (NMCB-4) load TriCon containers loaded with construction equipment destined for field testing in Iraq, into a U.S. Air Force, Air Mobility Command, C-5 Galaxy transport aircraft.

Video of a ULD loader loading LD3 containers from apron dollies into a Boeing 777's cargo bay

=== Transporters ===
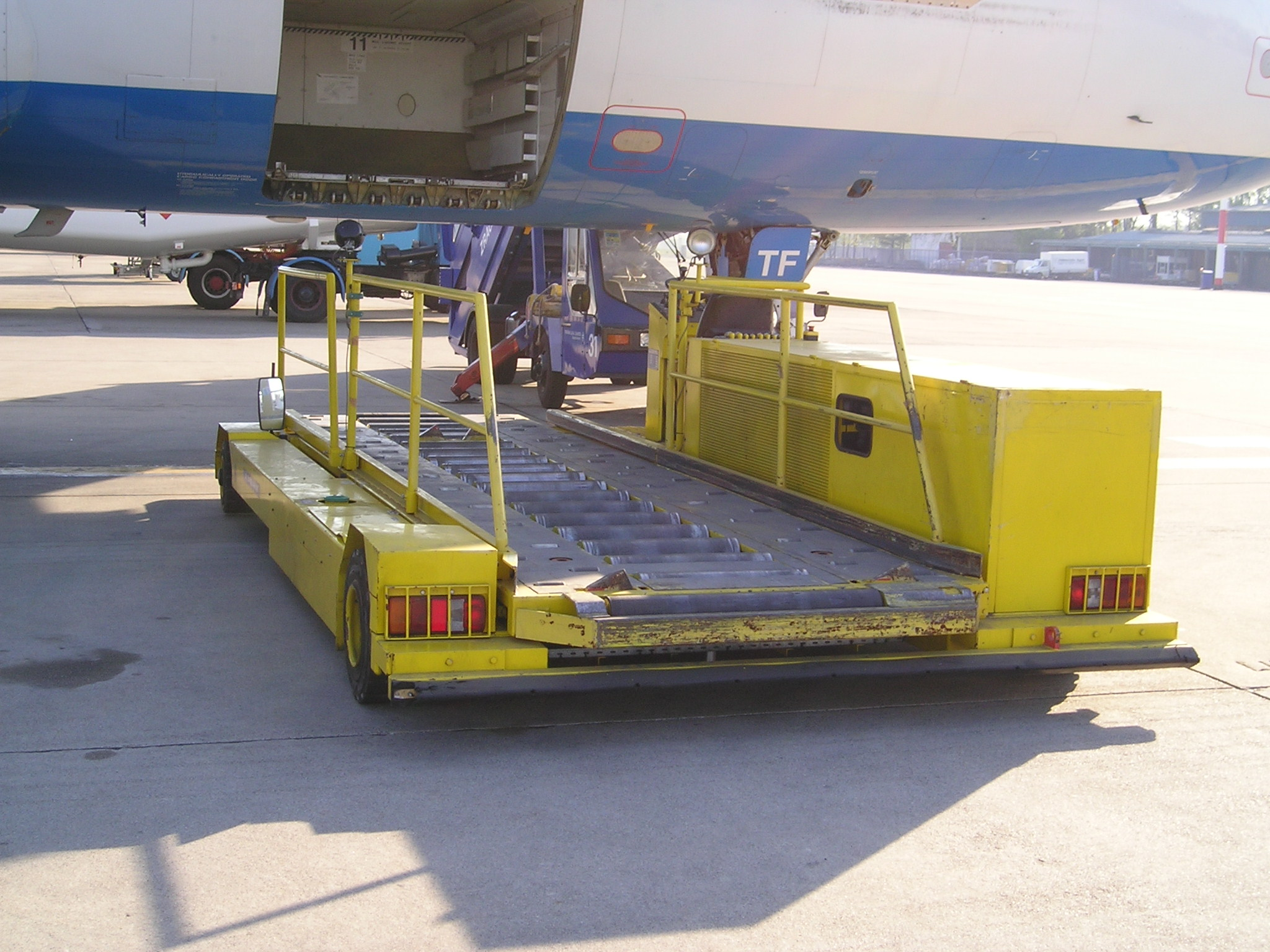
Container transporter

Transporters are cargo platforms constructed so that, beside loading and unloading containers, they can also transport the cargo. These transporters are not typically used in the United States.

=== Air start unit ===
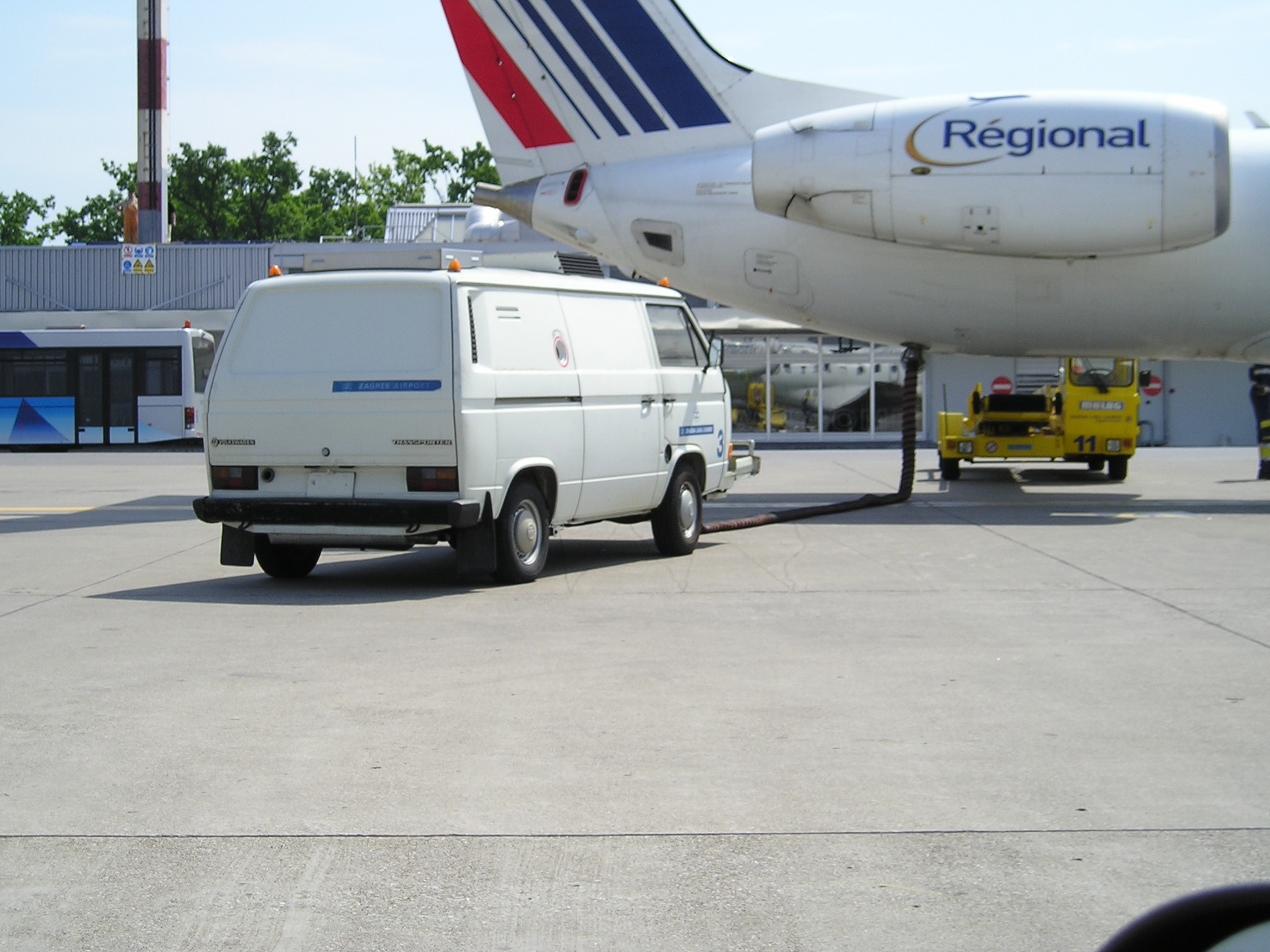
Volkswagen Type 2 (T3) jet air starter

An air start unit (ASU, also known as a "start cart") is a device used to start an aircraft's engines when it is not equipped with an on-board APU or the APU is not operational. There are three primary types of these devices that exist currently: a stored air cart, a gas turbine based unit, and a diesel engine driven screw compressor unit. All three devices create a source of low pressure, high volume air to start the aircraft engines. Typically one or two hoses are connected to these units, with the largest aircraft engines requiring three.

=== Non-potable water trucks ===
Non-potable water trucks are special vehicles that provide water to an aircraft. The water is filtered and protected from the elements while being stored on the vehicle. A pump in the vehicle assists in moving the water from the truck to the aircraft. The water is designated as non-potable.

=== Lavatory service vehicles ===
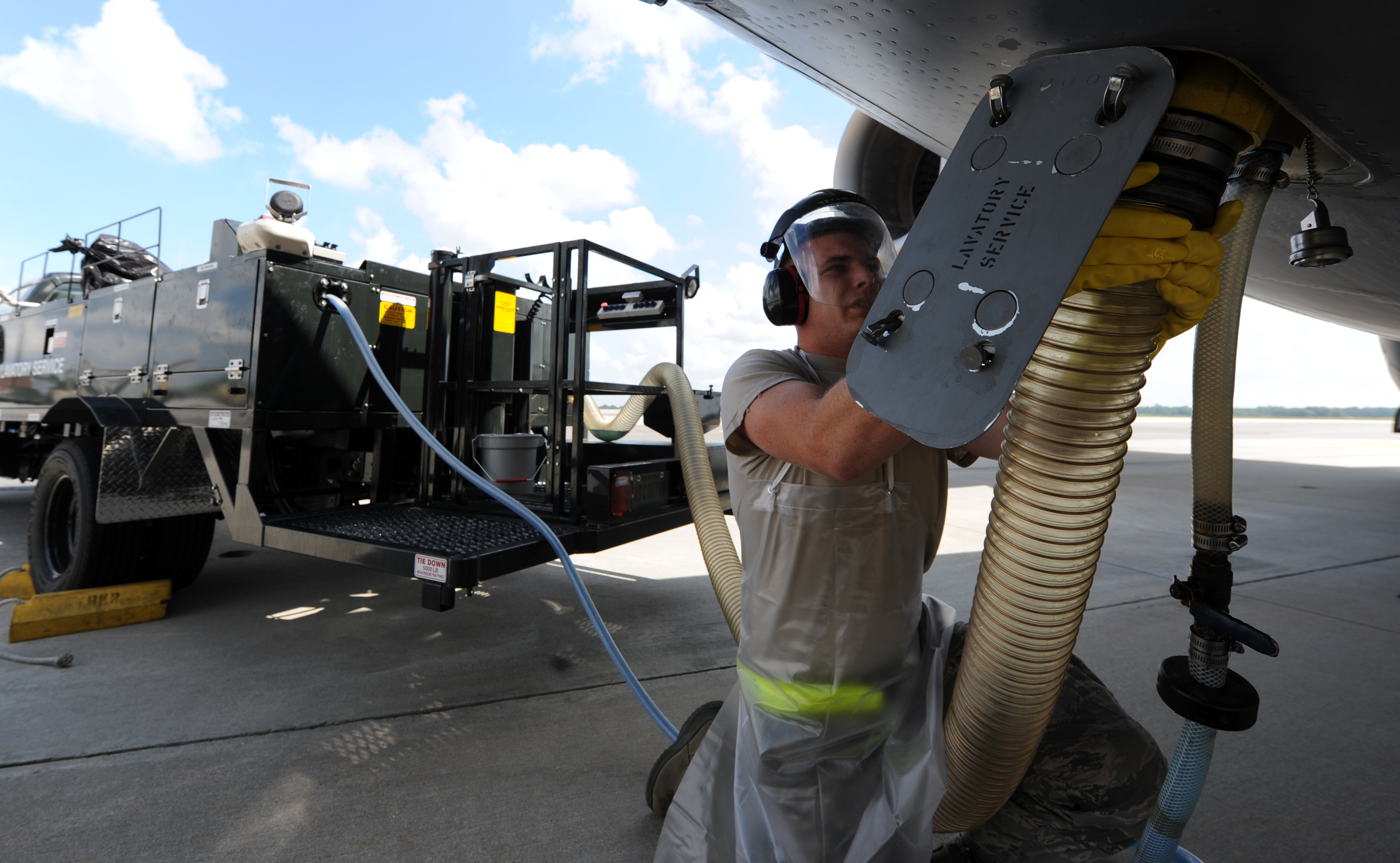
A man connects the waste suction hose to the lavatory service outlet on the underbelly of a C-17 Globemaster III, enabling him to suck the waste into a tank in the truck shown in the background.

Lavatory service vehicles empty and refill lavatories onboard aircraft. Waste is stored in tanks on the aircraft until these vehicles can empty them and remove the waste. After the tank is emptied, it is refilled with a mixture of water and a disinfecting concentrate, commonly called 'blue juice'. Instead of a self-powered vehicle, some airports have lavatory carts, which are smaller and must be pulled by tug.

=== Catering vehicle ===
The catering vehicle resembles a typical box truck but it consists of a rear body, lifting system, platform and an electro-hydraulic control mechanism. The rear body can be lifted up, down and the platform can be moved to place in front of the aircraft.

Catering services include the unloading of unused food and drink from the aircraft, and the loading of fresh food and drinks for passengers and crew. The meals are typically delivered on standardized carts which are wheeled into the catering vehicle. Meals are prepared mostly on the ground in order to minimize the amount of preparation (apart from chilling or reheating) required during flight.

The vehicle then drives to the airport and is parked in front of the plane. The stabilizers are deployed and the van body is lifted. The platform can be fine controlled to move left-right as well as in-out so that it is aligned with the door correctly. The body is made of insulated panels and is capable of maintaining temperatures of 0 °C (32 °F) by means of refrigeration unit.

In-flight food is prepared in a flight kitchen facility, a completely HACCP certified facility where food is reheated in sterile and controlled environments. The prepared food is then placed in trollies and wheeled into the cabin.

A predecessor to the catering truck was in use by the U.S. Army Air Forces during World War II.

A special higher type of catering truck has been designed to accommodate the Airbus A380.

Catering vehicle gallery

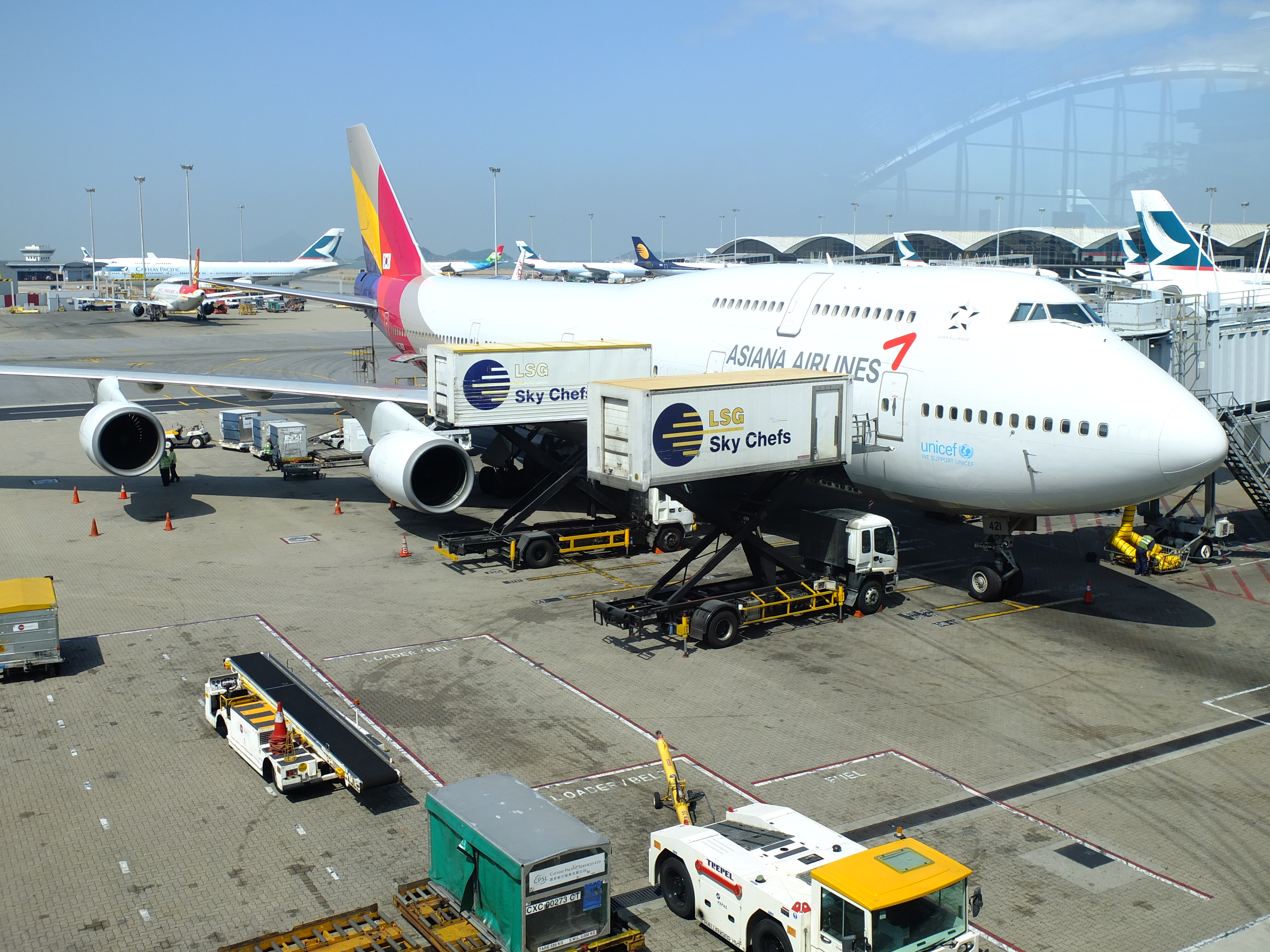
Two Aircraft Catering Vehicles serving an aircraft

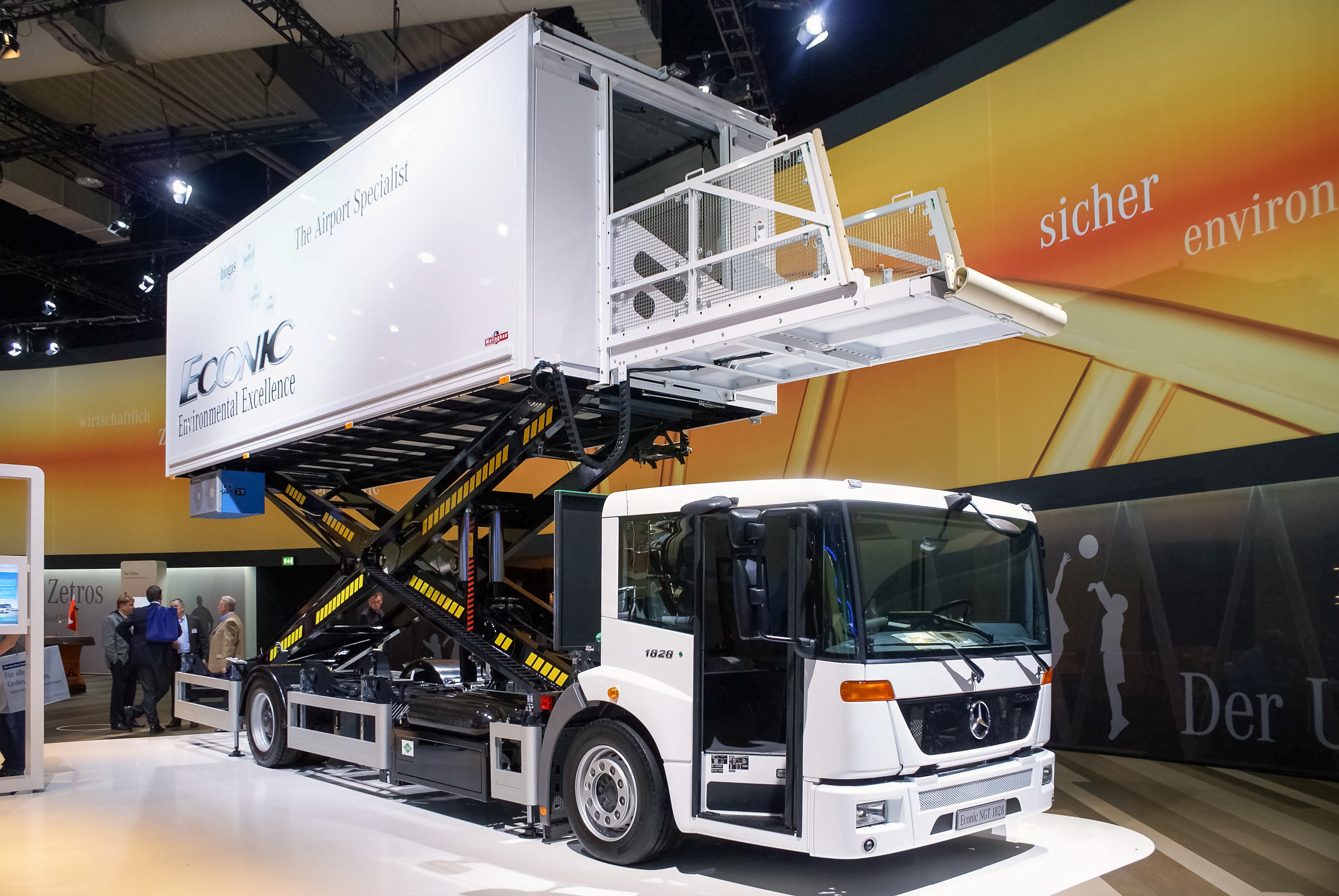
Mercedes-Benz Econic aircraft caterer

=== Belt loaders ===
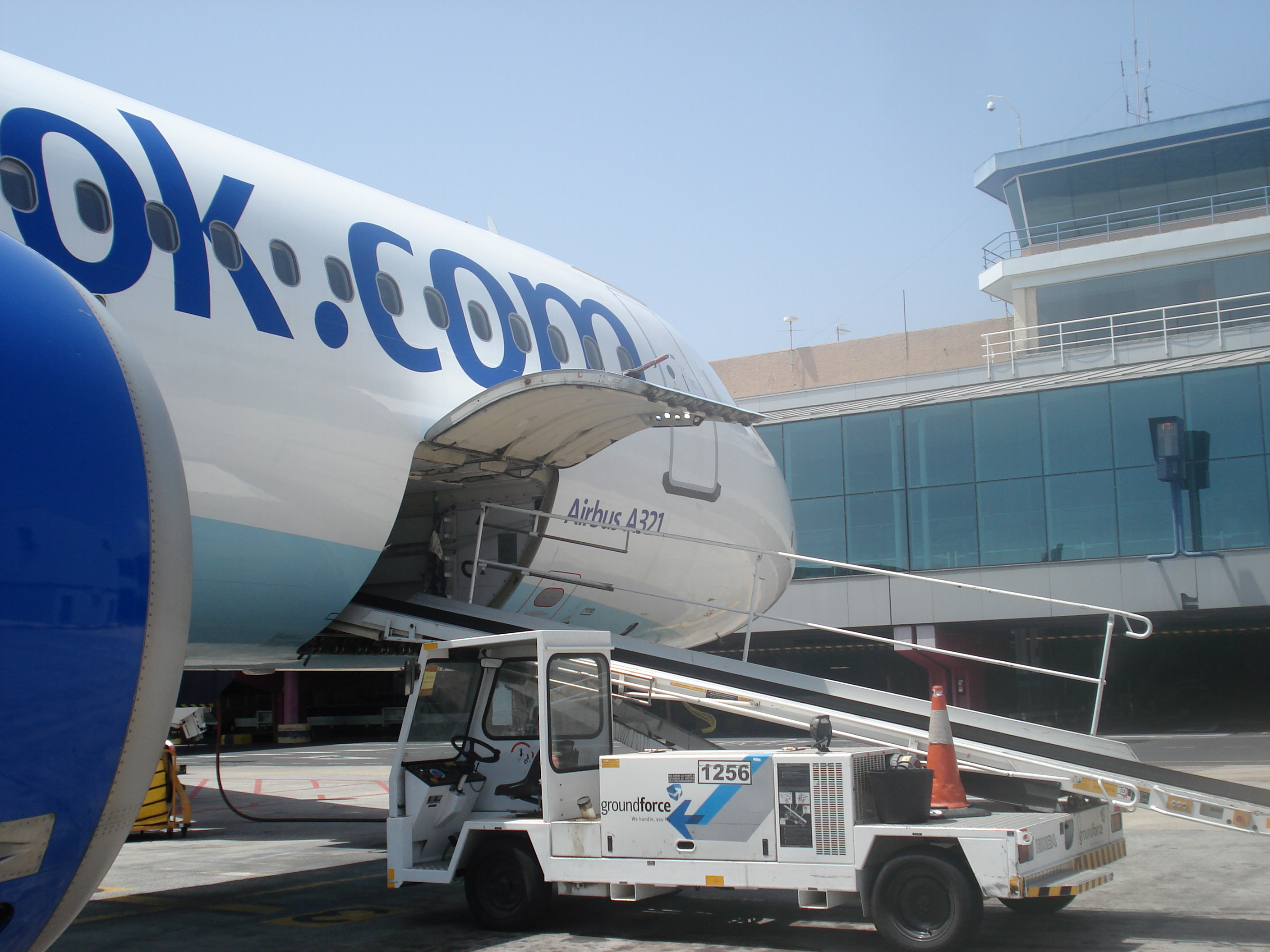
Belt loader

Belt loaders are vehicles with conveyor belts for unloading and loading of loose baggage and cargo onto aircraft. A belt loader is positioned at the door sill of an aircraft hold (baggage compartment) during operation. Belt loaders are used for narrowbody aircraft, and the bulk hold of wide body aircraft. Stowing baggage without containers is known as bulk loading.

=== Passenger boarding steps/stairs ===
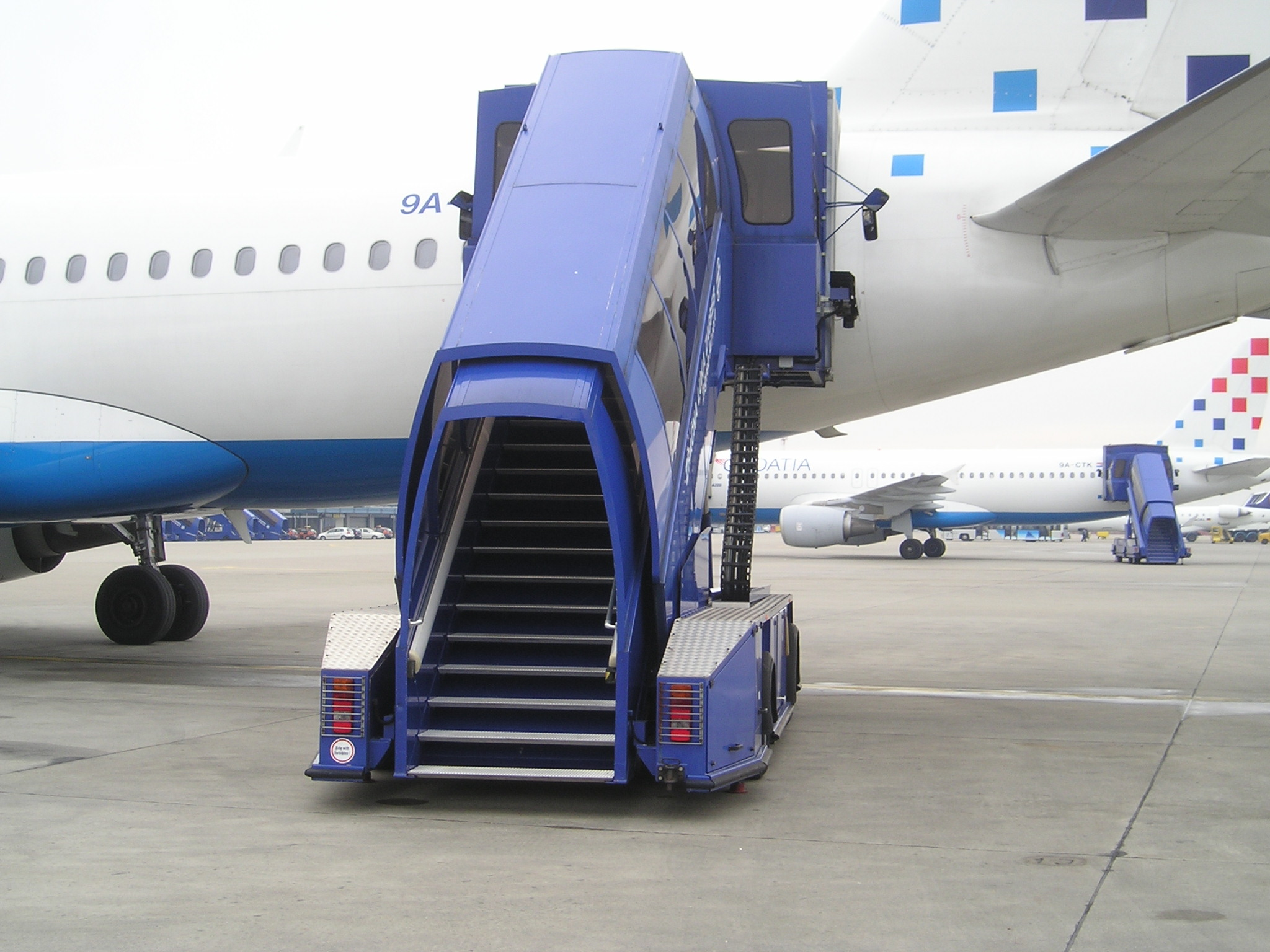
Passenger boarding stairs

Passenger boarding stairs, sometimes referred to as boarding ramps, stair car or aircraft steps, provide a mobile means to traverse between the aircraft doors and the ground. Because larger aircraft have door sills 5 to 20 feet (1.5 to 6.1 m) high, stairs facilitate safe boarding and deplaning. Smaller units are generally moved by being towed or pushed, while larger units are self-powered. Most models have adjustable height to accommodate various aircraft. Optional features may include canopies, heating, supplementary lighting, and a red carpet for VIP passengers. Larger aircraft may use one or more jet bridges connected to the terminal building for passenger boarding, but ground-based stairs are used when this is unavailable or impractical.

=== Pushback tugs and tractors ===
Pushback tugs are mostly used to push an aircraft away from the gate when it is ready to leave. These tugs are very powerful and because of the large engines, are sometimes referred to as an engine with wheels. Pushback tugs can also be used to pull aircraft in various situations, such as to a hangar. Different size tugs are required for different size aircraft. Some tugs use a tow-bar as a connection between the tug and the aircraft, while other tugs lift the nose gear off the ground to make it easier to tow or push. Recently there has been a push for towbarless tractors as larger airplanes are designed.

Tugs and tractors gallery

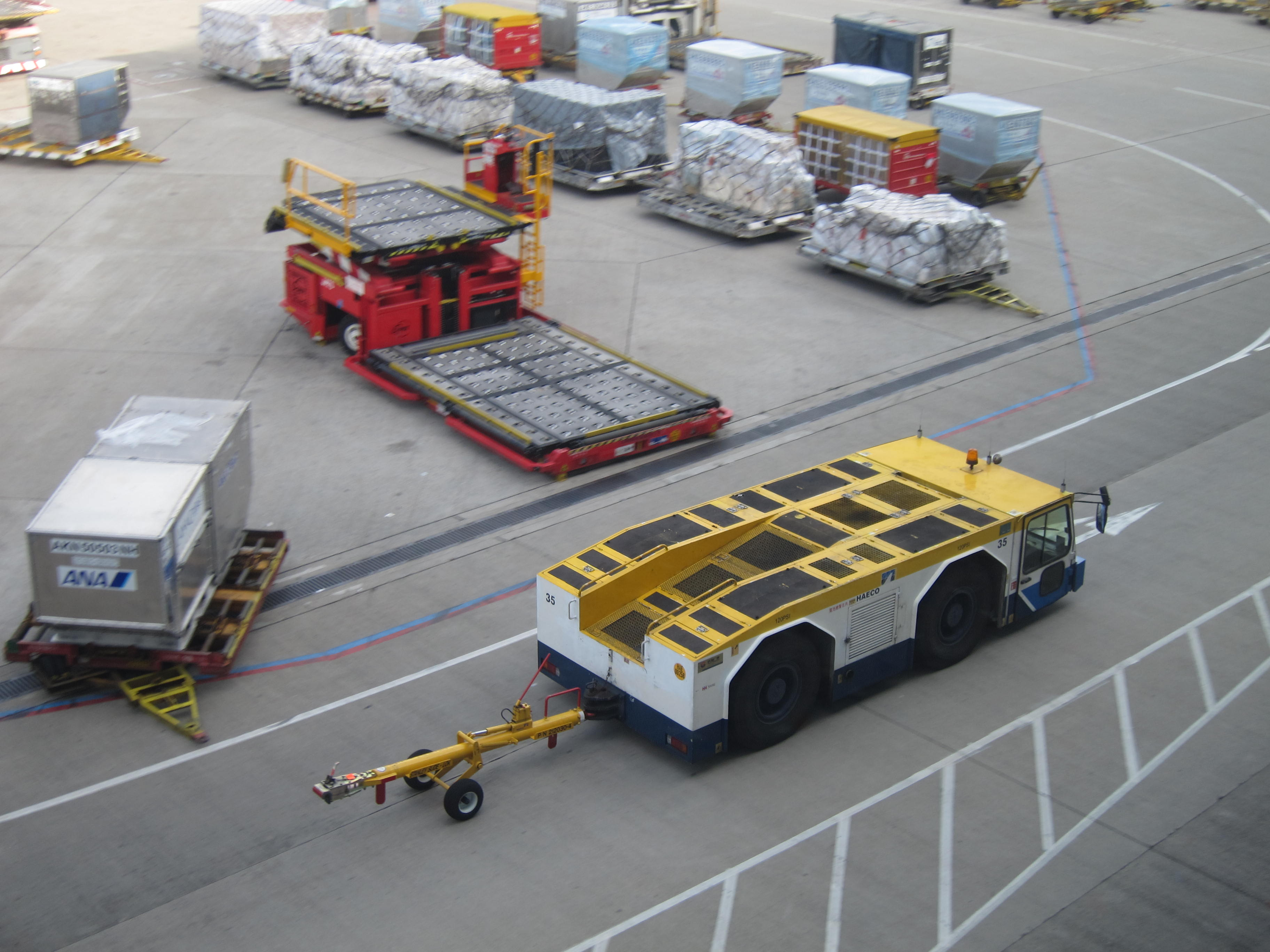
A pushback tug with towbar attached

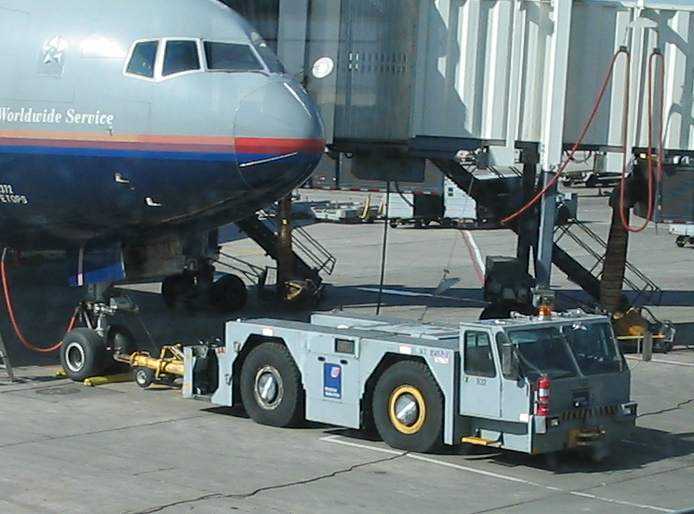
A conventional tractor hooked up to a United Airlines Boeing 777-200ER at Denver International Airport

=== De/anti-icing vehicles ===
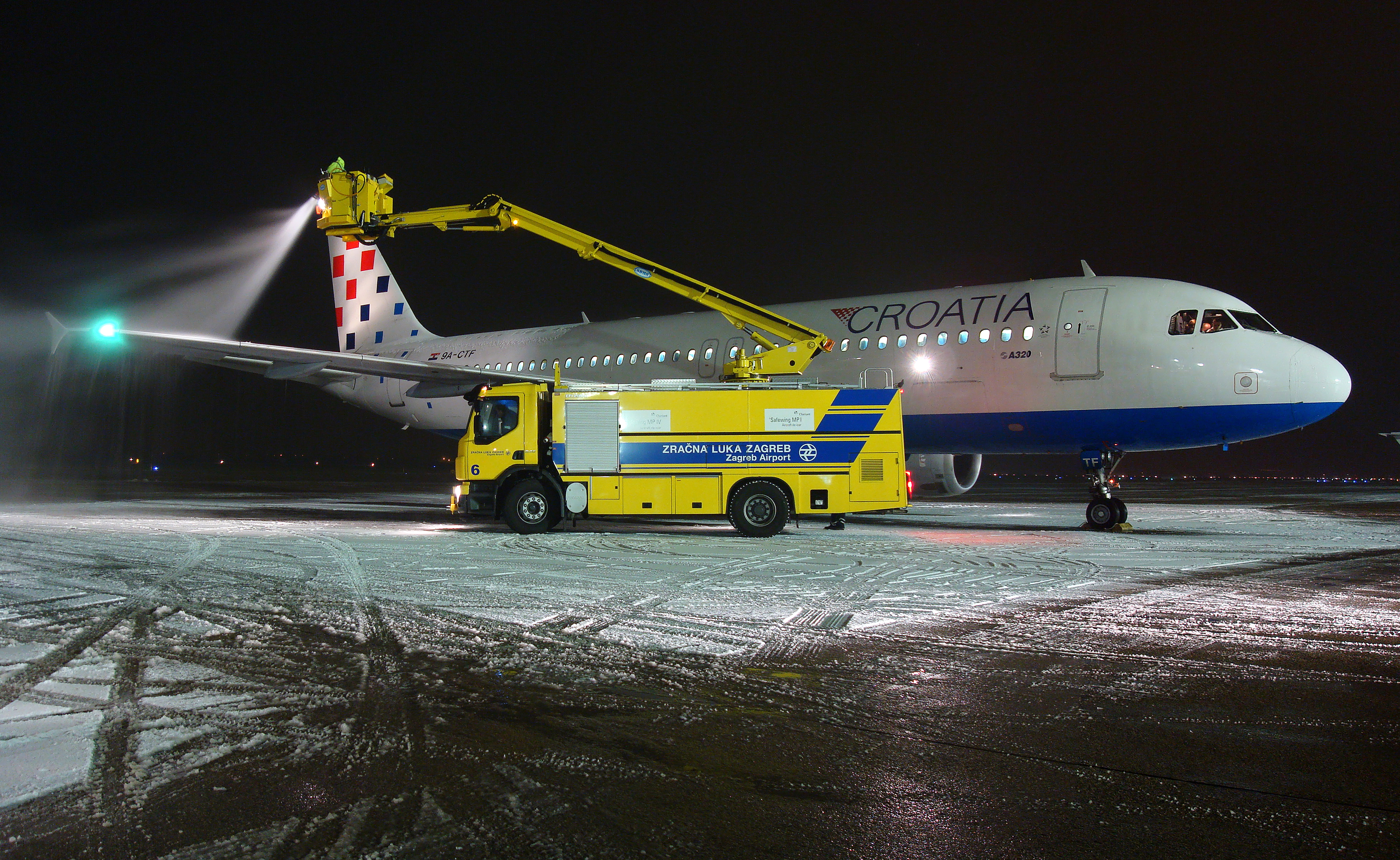
A de/anti-icing vehicle de-icing the wing of a Croatia Airlines aircraft

The procedure of de/anti-icing, protection from fluids freezing up on aircraft, is done from special vehicles. These vehicles have booms, like a cherry picker, to allow easy access to the entire aircraft. A hose sprays a special mixture that melts current ice on the aircraft and also prevents some ice from building up while waiting on the ground.

=== Aircraft rescue and firefighting ===
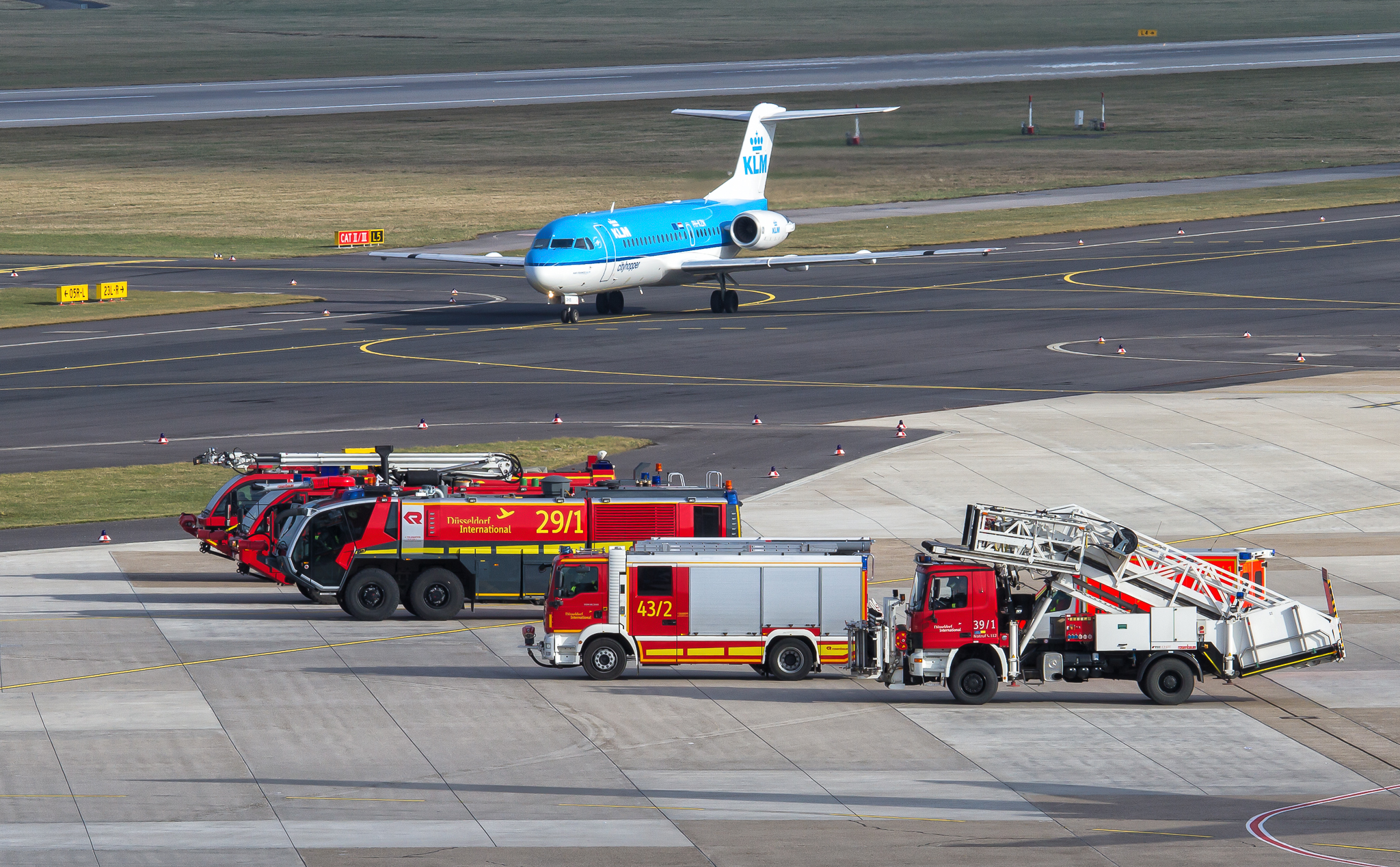
Firefighting equipment at Düsseldorf Airport, 2013

Aircraft rescue and firefighting is a special category of firefighting that involves the response, hazard mitigation, evacuation and possible rescue of passengers and crew of an aircraft involved in (typically) an airport ground emergency.

== See also ==
- AERO Specialties
- Aircraft ground handling
- Airline service trolley
- Air-start system
- Bag ramp
- Baggage tug
- Charging station
- Electric cart
- Electric truck
- Hydraulics International, INC.
- Non-road engine
- Pushback (aviation)
- Visual Guidance Docking Systems (VGDS)
