= Taxiing =

Movement of an aircraft on the ground, under its own power

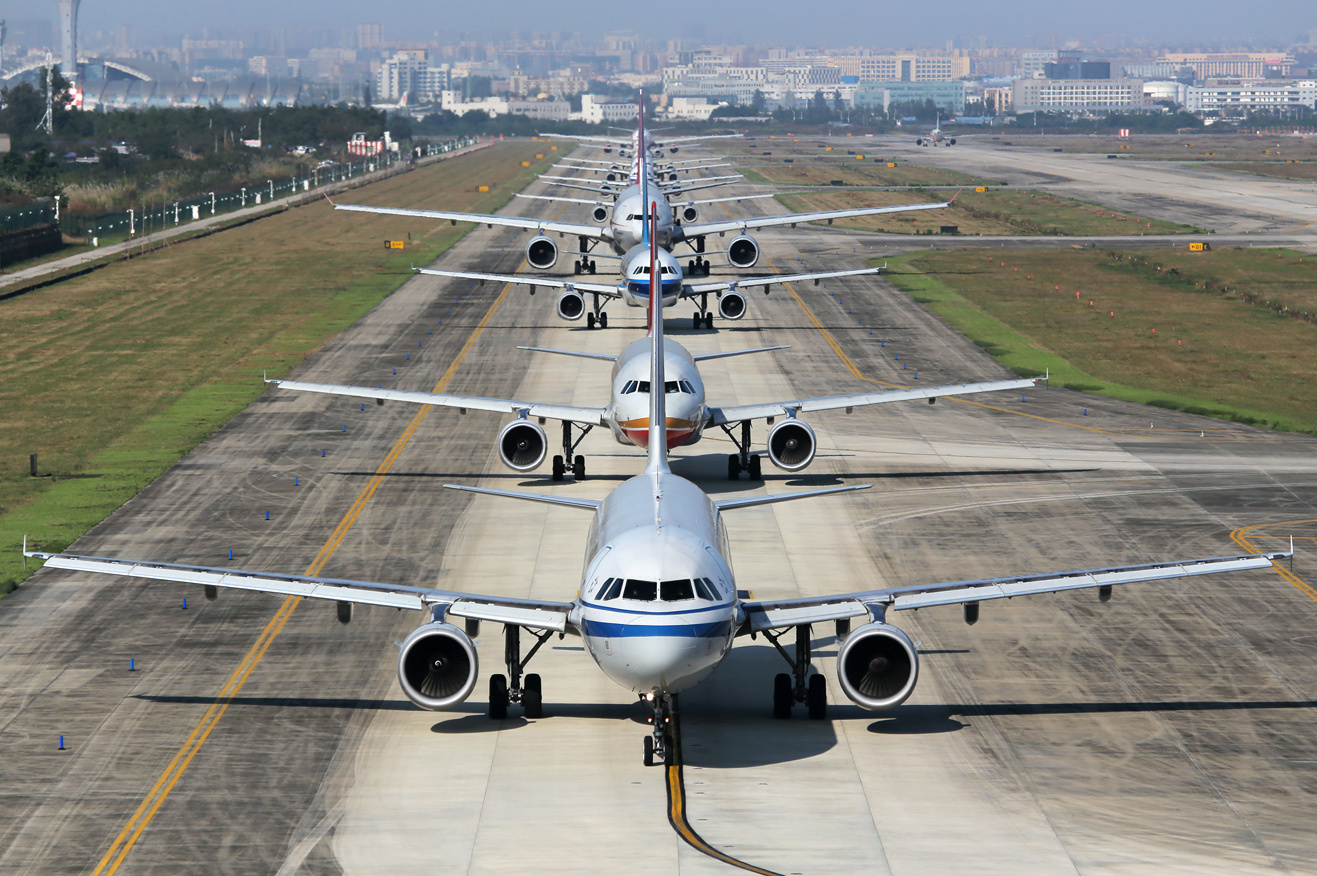
Airbus jet airliners taxiing at Chengdu Shuangliu International Airport

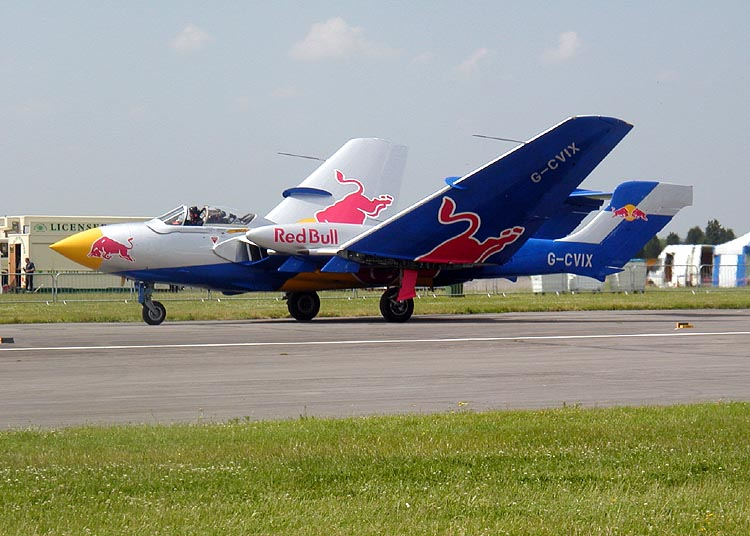
A privately owned Sea Vixen taxis back from an air show flight, with wings folding as it moves.

Taxiing (rarely spelled taxying) is the movement of an aircraft on the ground, under its own power, in contrast to towing or pushback where the aircraft is moved by a tug. The aircraft usually moves on wheels, but the term also includes aircraft with skis or floats (for water-based travel).

An airplane uses taxiways to taxi from one place on an airport to another; for example, when moving from a hangar to the runway. The term "taxiing" is not used for the accelerating run along a runway prior to takeoff, or the decelerating run immediately after landing, which are called the takeoff roll and landing rollout, respectively; however, aircraft are considered to be taxiing when they leave the runway after landing to travel to a gate or remote stand for disembarkment.

== Etymology ==
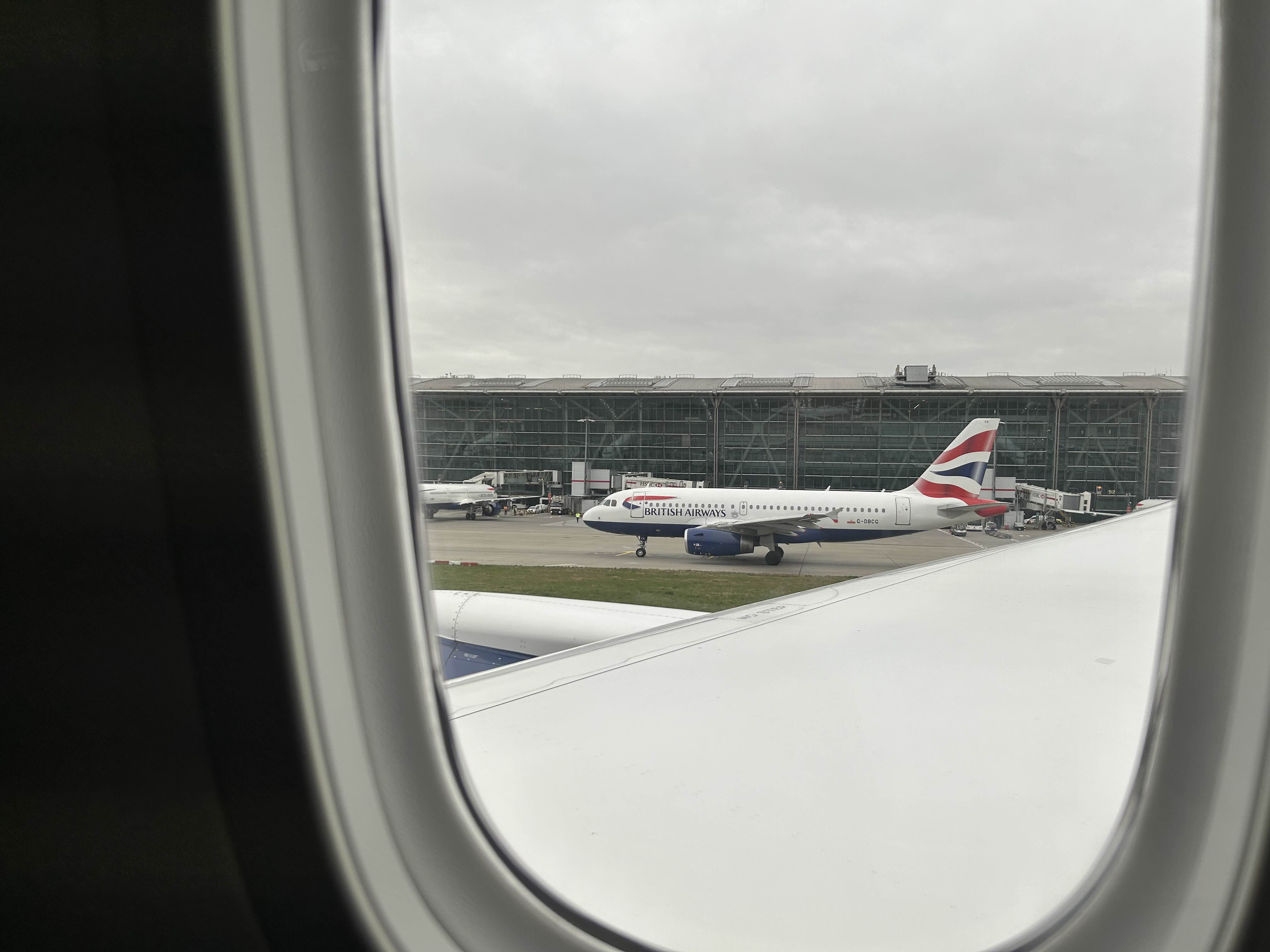
An Airbus A319-131 operated by British Airways, taxiing on the apron at Heathrow Airport. This photograph was taken from a Boeing 787-10 Dreamliner, which was in the process of taxiing on a taxiway.

As early as 1909, aviation journalists envisioned aeroplanes to replace the taxicab in traffic-congested cities.

Some aviators and some linguists report that around the year 1911 the slang word "taxi" was in use for an "airplane". They suggest that the way aircraft move under power before they take off or after they land reminded someone of the way taxicabs slowly drove around the block when looking for passengers.

Also by 1909, French aviation pioneers like Blériot, Farman and Voisin used the term "taxi" for a trainer aircraft, that was so constructed that a pupil would not accidentally get airborne.

Usage of the word for an airplane quickly disappeared again, but the verb "to taxi" stuck, and words like the "taxiway" were derived from it.

== Propulsion ==
The thrust to propel the aircraft forward comes from its propellers or jet engines. Reverse thrust for backing up can be generated by thrust reversers such as on the Boeing C-17 Globemaster III, or reversible pitch propellers such as on the Lockheed C-130 Hercules, a rare procedure known as powerback. Most aircraft, however, are not designed to back up on their own and must be pushed back either by hand or by using an aircraft tug.

At low power settings, combustion aircraft engines operate at lower efficiency than at cruise power settings. A typical A320 spends an average of 3.5 hours a day taxiing, using 600 liters (160 U.S. gal) of fuel. Hybrid electrically driven nose gear are under development to allow high use aircraft to shut down the engines during taxi operations.

== Control ==
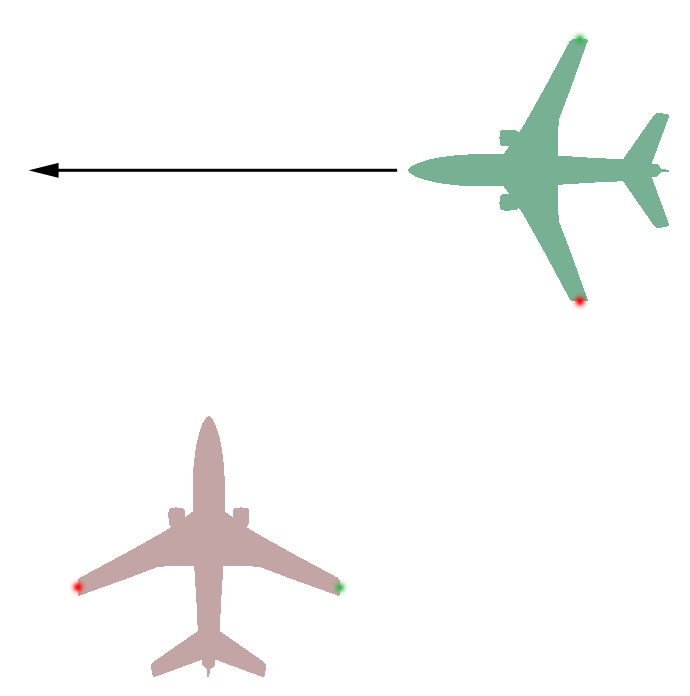
Aircraft on the right hand side has the right-of-way during taxiing.

Steering is achieved by turning a nose wheel or tail wheel/rudder; the pilot controls the direction travelled with their feet. Larger jet aircraft have a tiller wheel on the left side of the cockpit that acts as a steering wheel allowing the nosewheel to be turned hydraulically. Braking is controlled by differential toe or heel brakes. Not all aircraft have steerable wheels, and in some cases steering is solely by means of differential braking (all Van's aircraft for instance) or solely by means of the rudder (including all floatplanes).

== Hover taxi ==
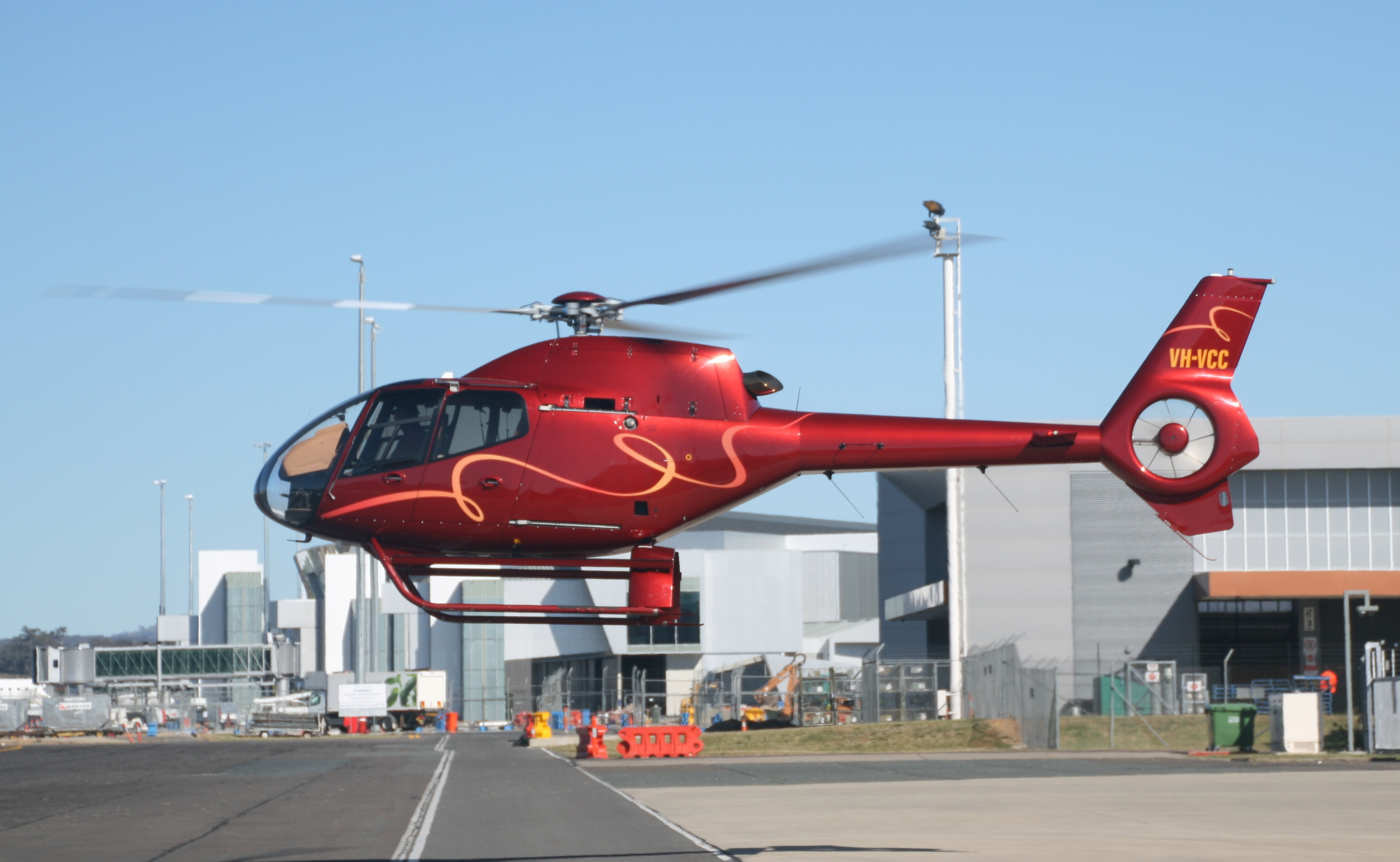
A Eurocopter EC120B hover-taxis

Skid-equipped helicopters and other VTOL (Vertical Take-Off and Landing) aircraft conduct hover taxiing to move in ground effect in the same manner that wheel-equipped aircraft ground taxi. In general hover taxis are conducted at speeds up to 20 kn (37 km/h; 23 mph), or below translational lift.

The Bell CH-135 Twin Huey is hover taxied in a manner typical for skid-equipped aircraft of that size:

This sequence is initiated from a stabilized 5 ft hover. Move the aircraft forward over the ground at a brisk walking pace. Maintain a constant height above ground, constant forward speed and ensure that the skids remain parallel to the direction of movement. Anticipate stopping so that large rearward cyclic applications are not required as this may result in the tail skids striking the ground. You are often required to taxi out of wind; be aware that when taxiing downwind in strong wind conditions there may be insufficient rearward cyclic to ensure adequate control and that the tail will be nearer the ground. Taxiing downwind is limited to 30 kts.

== Safety ==
When taxiing, aircraft travel slowly. This ensures that they can be stopped quickly and do not risk wheel damage on larger aircraft if they accidentally turn off the paved surface. Taxi speeds are typically 16 to 19 kn (30 to 35 km/h; 18 to 22 mph).

Rotor downwash limits helicopter hover-taxiing near parked light aircraft. The use of engine thrust near terminals is restricted due to the possibility of structural damage or injury to personnel caused by jet blast.
