= Mototok International GmbH =

German electric aircraft tug manufacturer

Mototok International GmbH is a German manufacturer of remote-controlled, fully electric, towbarless aircraft tugs, headquartered in Krefeld, North Rhine-Westphalia, Germany. The company was founded in 2003 and manufactures ground support equipment for civil aviation, business aviation, and military customers.

== History ==
Mototok International GmbH was founded in 2003 by Kersten Eckert, Olaf Hagelkruys, and Thilo Wiers-Keiser in Krefeld, Germany. Eckert, an aeromechanic and hobby pilot, developed a prototype remote-controlled aircraft tug to reduce the number of ground crew required to move aircraft out of hangars. The first commercial sale took place in 2005, with serial manufacturing beginning in 2007.

In 2019, Mototok was named Ground Support Worldwide Product Leader of the Year by AviationPros magazine.

In 2025, Mototok established a subsidiary, Mototok Corporation, in Atlanta, Georgia, United States.

== Products ==
Mototok manufactures several series of fully electric, towbarless aircraft tugs. All models use an electric drivetrain, a radio remote control, and a hydraulic and sensor-controlled system for engaging the nose gear of the aircraft without a towbar. According to Future Airport, an official driving licence is not required to operate the equipment; a one-day training is sufficient.

=== M-Series ===
The M-Series is designed for light aircraft, most wheeled helicopters, and smaller business aircraft up to 28 tonnes (61,700 lb), intended for use at MRO facilities, fixed-base operators (FBOs), and corporate flight departments.

=== TWIN-Series ===
The TWIN-Series is designed for medium to large business jets and wheeled helicopters up to 75 tonnes (165,300 lb), including a model for pushback operations for regional commercial aircraft.

=== SPACER-Series ===
The SPACER-Series is designed for commercial airliners up to 200 tonnes (440,924 lb). The SPACER 8600 NG is a variant for pushback operations of narrow-body aircraft up to 105 tonnes (231,485 lb), compatible with aircraft including the Airbus A320 and Boeing 737. According to Business Insider, the device can move aircraft weighing up to 130 tonnes and took approximately 15 minutes of training before first use.

=== LB-Series ===
The LB-Series is designed for military applications, compatible with helicopters and military aircraft up to 75 tonnes (165,350 lb). Optional features include saltwater resistance, four-wheel active steering, and a magnetic arresting system for operations aboard aircraft carriers.

=== Alligator-Series ===
The Alligator-Series is designed for helicopters with low ground clearance due to undercarriage-mounted equipment such as FLIR systems, radar, or cameras. The series uses a patented clamp mechanism to engage the helicopter's nose wheel.

== Operations ==
=== British Airways ===
British Airways began deploying Mototok SPACER 8600 pushback tugs at Heathrow Airport Terminal 5A in August 2017, with 28 units installed at docking stations across the terminal. The airline described the introduction as part of a commitment to emissions-free airside operations.

In July 2018, Business Insider reported on the technology after being invited by British Airways to operate one of the devices. The publication noted that the tug required approximately 15 minutes of training before use. By 2019, British Airways reported that the tugs had contributed to a reduction in departure delays of up to 54 percent at Heathrow Terminal 5, and stated that the airline had become the most punctual major short-haul operator flying out of London. Tom Stevens, British Airways' Head of Airports Operations, was quoted as saying the technology helped the airline maintain its punctuality performance.

=== All Nippon Airways ===
All Nippon Airways (ANA) became the first airline in Japan to deploy a remote-controlled, towbarless electric pushback tug, introducing the Mototok Spacer 8600 at Saga Airport in July 2019. ANA reported that staff training time was reduced by half compared to conventional towing vehicles. Future Airport reported that further deployments at other Japanese airports were planned following the initial introduction.

=== Iberia Airport Services ===
Iberia Airport Services ordered Mototok pushback tugs for Barcelona–El Prat Airport and Madrid-Barajas in 2020. Future Airport reported this as part of a broader adoption of the technology across European carriers following the British Airways deployment. According to Iberia, each electric tug saves approximately 23 tonnes of CO₂ per year compared to a diesel equivalent.

=== Malaysia Airlines ===
Malaysia Airlines introduced the SPACER 8600 NG through its ground handling subsidiary AeroDarat at Kuala Lumpur International Airport in 2023. AeroDarat was described as the first ground handling company in Asia to operate this model, with an initial order of 12 units.

=== FL Technics Indonesia ===
FL Technics Indonesia introduced the SPACER 8600 NG at Ngurah Rai International Airport in Bali in January 2024.

== Technical characteristics ==
The tugs use differential steering regulated by microprocessors, allowing the nose gear to rotate without requiring the aircraft to move forward or backward. The operator controls the tug via remote control from outside the aircraft, at a distance of up to approximately 15 metres, maintaining a view of the aircraft during ground movements. Future Airport noted that this arrangement eliminates the need for wing walkers and allows the operator to maintain eye contact with the flight crew during pushback.

According to a 2023 report by Simple Flying, the compact dimensions of Mototok tugs allow aircraft to be parked closer together than with conventional equipment, with potential hangar capacity increases of up to 160 percent.

== See also ==
- Ground support equipment
- Aircraft ground handling
- Pushback (aviation)
