= Powerback =

Aircraft operation

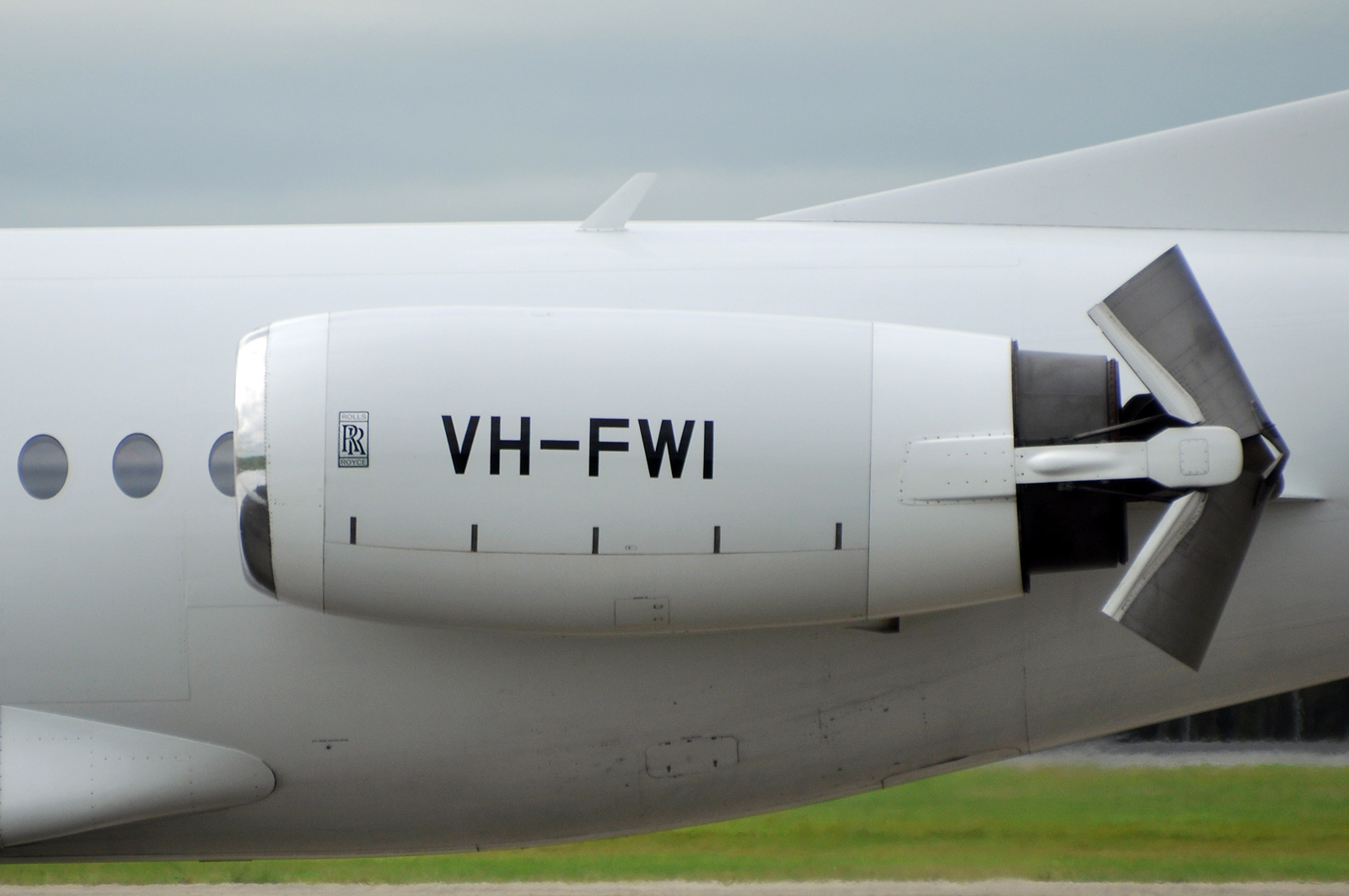
VH-FWI Fokker 100 with thrust reverser

Powerback is used by aircraft to move backwards on the ground using the power of their engines in reverse thrust operation. Civil and general aviation aircraft equipped with reverse thrust are technically or theoretically able to use powerbacks as a means of "backing up" but such operation is prohibited or strongly discouraged by aircraft manufacturers as well as airport safety regulations in nations with actual aviation safety regulating agencies.

== Background ==
While many aircraft are physically capable of performing powerbacks, many companies impose restrictions on the practice, mainly due to the risk of FOD (foreign object damage) from debris propelled into the air. This problem is magnified even more with planes having wing-mounted engines, as their proximity to the ground can exacerbate debris ingestion if powerbacks are used. Small metal objects are particularly dangerous as they can be propelled into terminal windows, employees on the ground or even the aircraft itself. Applying the brakes when backing up also has the potential to cause a tailstrike.

During the 1980s, many aircraft with aft-mounted engines, such as DC-9s, Boeing 727s, and MD-80s used powerbacks to reduce the number of ground personnel required. For example, Northwest Airlines' fleet of DC-9 aircraft used powerback operations at certain airports, but discontinued the practice in 2005 citing the need to conserve fuel. KLM also avoids using the procedure for the same reasons, noting that powerbacks cause extra wear on the engines.

In addition, in the United States, restrictions on powerbacks are enforced by the FAA and local aviation officials. Only certain gates at certain airports are approved for powerbacks, and they are usually placarded as such. Many airlines impose stricter safety procedures for powerbacks, which often include disallowing a powerback under certain environmental conditions, such as rain or snow.

== Military use ==
In several US military aircraft, such as the C-130 Hercules, the C-5 Galaxy and the C-17 Globemaster III, powerback operation is technically possible, as demonstrated at civil airshows, but there are severe restrictions on all reverse-thrust–capable aircraft performing "pushback" on their own.

== See also ==
- Taxiing
- Air Florida Flight 90
