= Thrust reversal =

Temporary diversion of an aircraft engine's thrust

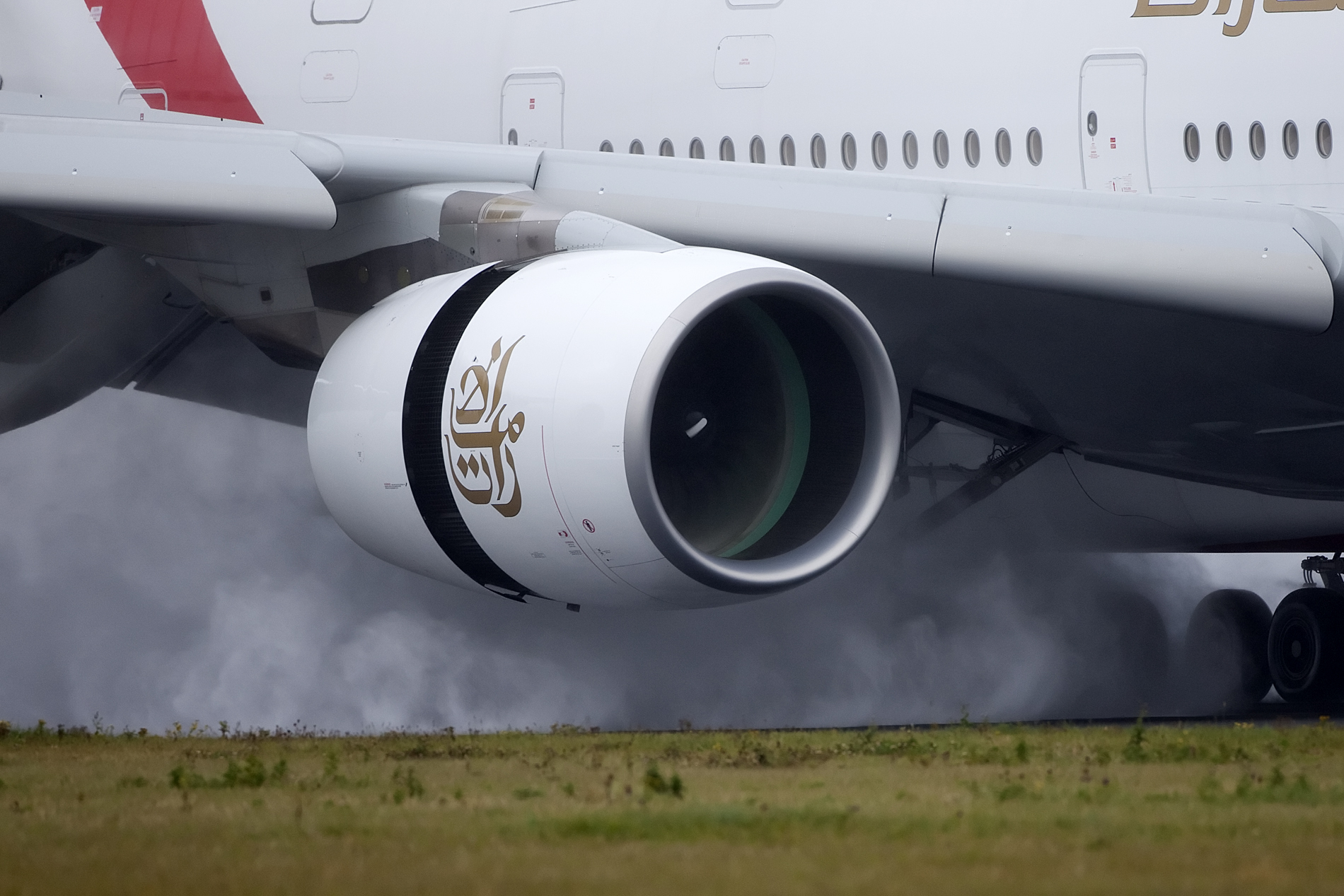
An Airbus A380 with thrust reverser in operation while slowing down on the runway, blowing water from the wet surface and making the reversed air flow observable.

Thrust reversal, also called reverse thrust, is an operating mode for jet engines equipped with a thrust reverser when thrust is directed forwards for slowing an aircraft after landing. It assists wheel braking and reduces brake wear. Fatal accidents have been caused by inadvertent use of thrust reversal in flight.

Aircraft equipped with propellers may also have an operating mode for directing their thrust forwards for braking, known as operating in reverse pitch.

== Overview ==
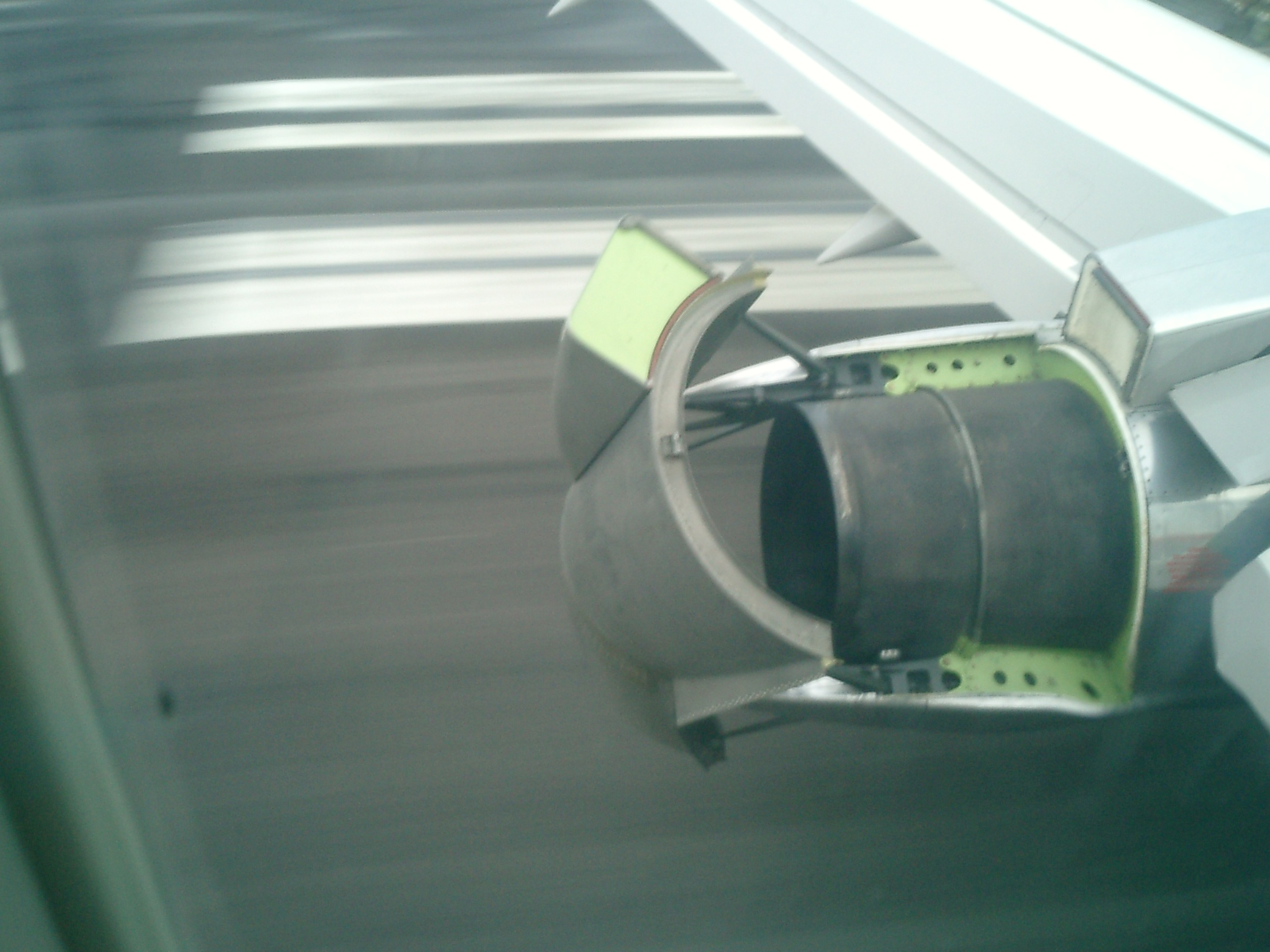
A passenger's view showing how the exhaust is blocked and directed forwards after leaving the engine. The aircraft is moving to the right.

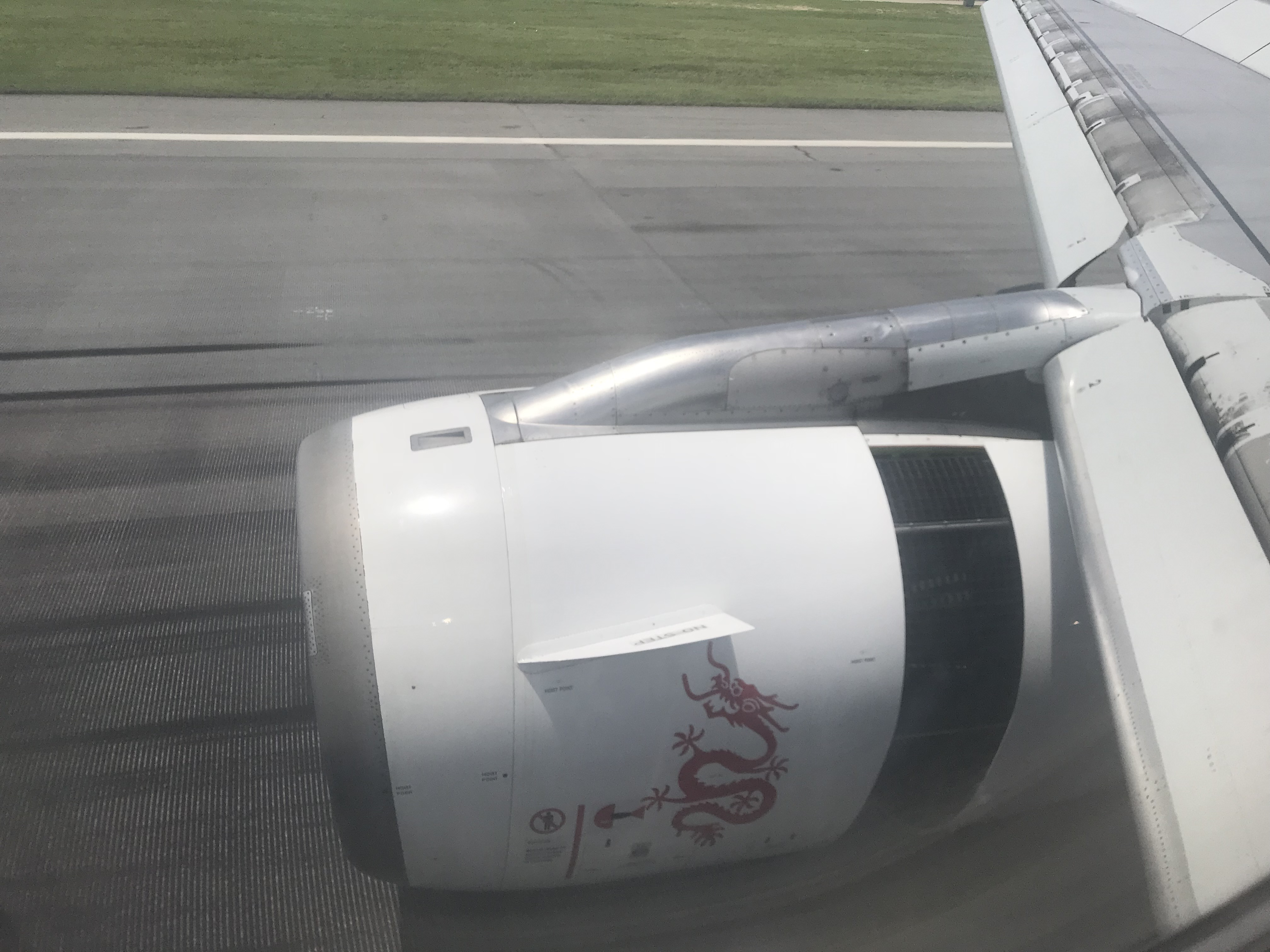
A passenger's view showing where fan air comes out of the side of the engine, after having its normal path blocked. It comes through the black grille, where it is turned forwards. The aircraft is moving to the left.

The main application for thrust reversal is to supplement wheel brakes when stopping on a runway. Aside from this, aircraft with thrust reversers have used them to give extra drag in flight to enable steeper descents. On the ground some aircraft types are allowed to make minor positioning moves backwards.

A thrust reverser works by changing the direction of the exhaust as it leaves a jet engine so instead of coming straight out of the back it is interrupted as it leaves and turned partially forwards. Alternatively its path inside the engine is blocked and it comes out of the sides, being turned partially forwards at the same time.

The engine is now acting against the aircraft motion as a braking device and needs to run at high speed, as during take-off, to give the required amount of reverse thrust.

To be most effective at slowing the aircraft reverse thrust is used while the aircraft is still at high speed as soon as it has landed on the runway. As the aircraft slows down the thrust reverse is cancelled because the exhaust, which is moving forwards, will be sucked back into the engine at slower speeds. Wheel braking takes over.

Reverse thrust is used on most civil jet aircraft, airliners and business jets. One exception is the BAe 146 which has a fuselage tip-mounted air brake instead. It is also not always required for all engines on a particular aircraft type if it has more than 2 engines. The 4-engined Airbus A380 only needs reversers on 2 engines and the 3-engined Dassault Falcon aircraft only needs a reverser on the center engine.

Reverse thrust has been used on combat aircraft, such as the Tornado and Viggen.

== Principle and uses ==
Thrust reversers are not required by the FAA for aircraft certification, where landing performance has to be demonstrated with no reverse thrust, but airlines prefer to incorporate them, primarily to provide additional stopping forces on slippery runways.

The brakes on the landing gear are sufficient in normal circumstances to stop the aircraft, but for safety purposes, and to reduce the stress on the brakes, another braking method is necessary. This also applies in bad weather, when snow or rain on the runway reduce the effectiveness of the brakes, and in emergencies like rejected takeoffs.

Thrust reversal can also be used in flight to reduce airspeed, though this is not common with modern aircraft. There are three common types of thrust reversing systems used on jet engines: the target, clam-shell, and cold stream systems. Some propeller-driven aircraft equipped with variable-pitch propellers can reverse thrust by changing the pitch of their propeller blades. Most commercial jetliners have such devices, and it also has applications in military aviation.

== Types of systems ==
Small aircraft typically do not have thrust reversal systems, except in specialized applications. On the other hand, large aircraft (those weighing more than 12,500 lb) almost always have the ability to reverse thrust. Reciprocating engine, turboprop and jet aircraft can all be designed to include thrust reversal systems.

=== Propeller-driven aircraft ===
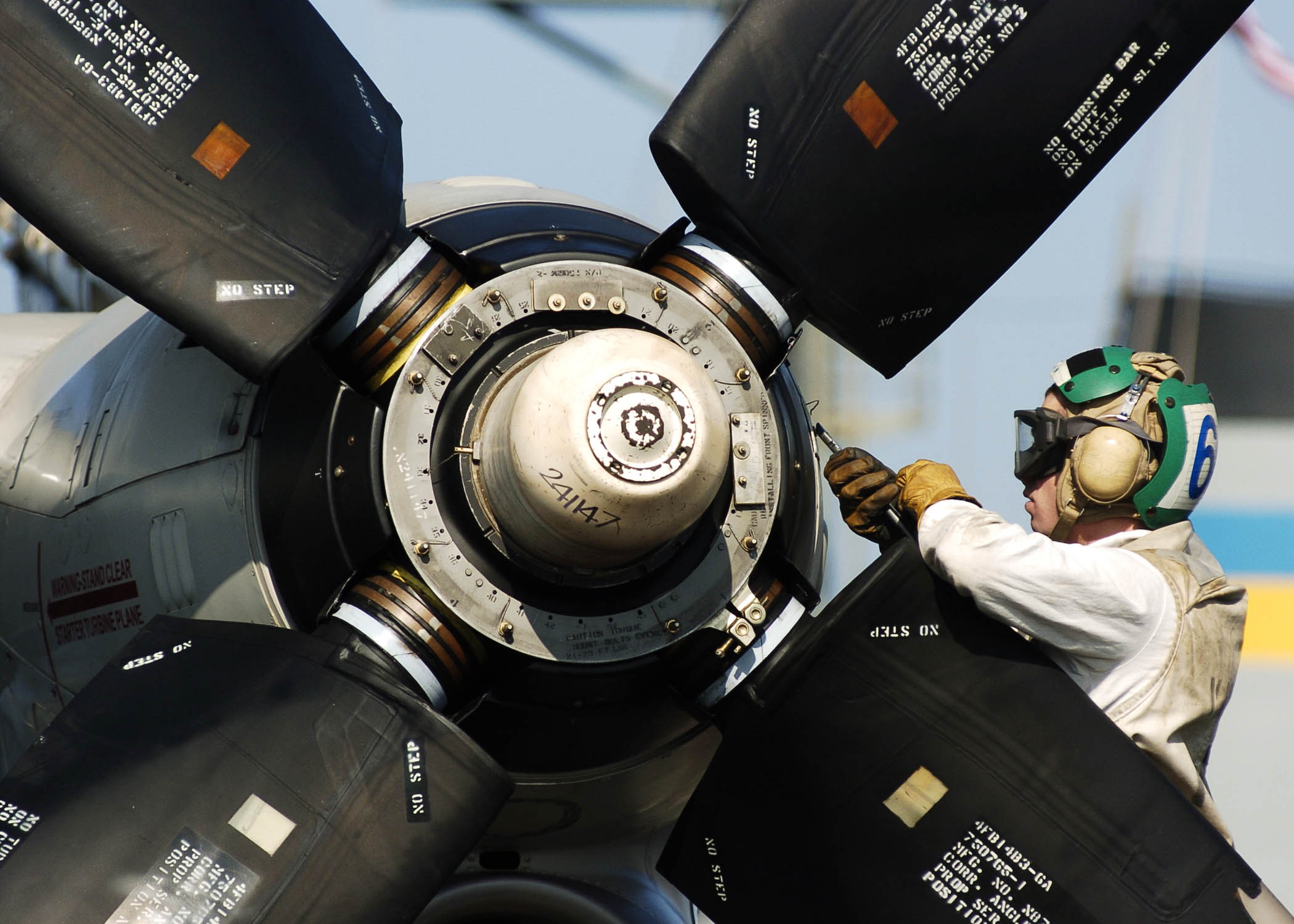
Variable-pitch propellers of an Grumman E-2C Hawkeye

Propeller-driven aircraft generate reverse thrust by changing the angle of their controllable-pitch propellers so that the propellers direct their thrust forward. This reverse thrust feature became available with the development of controllable-pitch propellers, which change the angle of the propeller blades to make efficient use of engine power over a wide range of conditions. Reverse thrust is created when the propeller pitch angle is reduced from fine to negative. This is called the beta position.

While piston-engine aircraft tend not to have reverse thrust, turboprop aircraft generally do. Examples include the PAC P-750 XSTOL, Cessna 208 Caravan, and Pilatus PC-6 Porter.

=== Jet aircraft ===
A target-type thrust reverser being deployed on a Cessna Citation.

On aircraft using jet engines, thrust reversal is accomplished by causing the jet blast to flow forward. The engine does not run or rotate in reverse; instead, thrust reversing devices are used to block the blast and redirect it forward. High bypass ratio engines usually reverse thrust by changing the direction of only the fan airflow, since the majority of thrust is generated by this section, as opposed to the core. There are three jet engine thrust reversal systems in common use:

==== External types ====
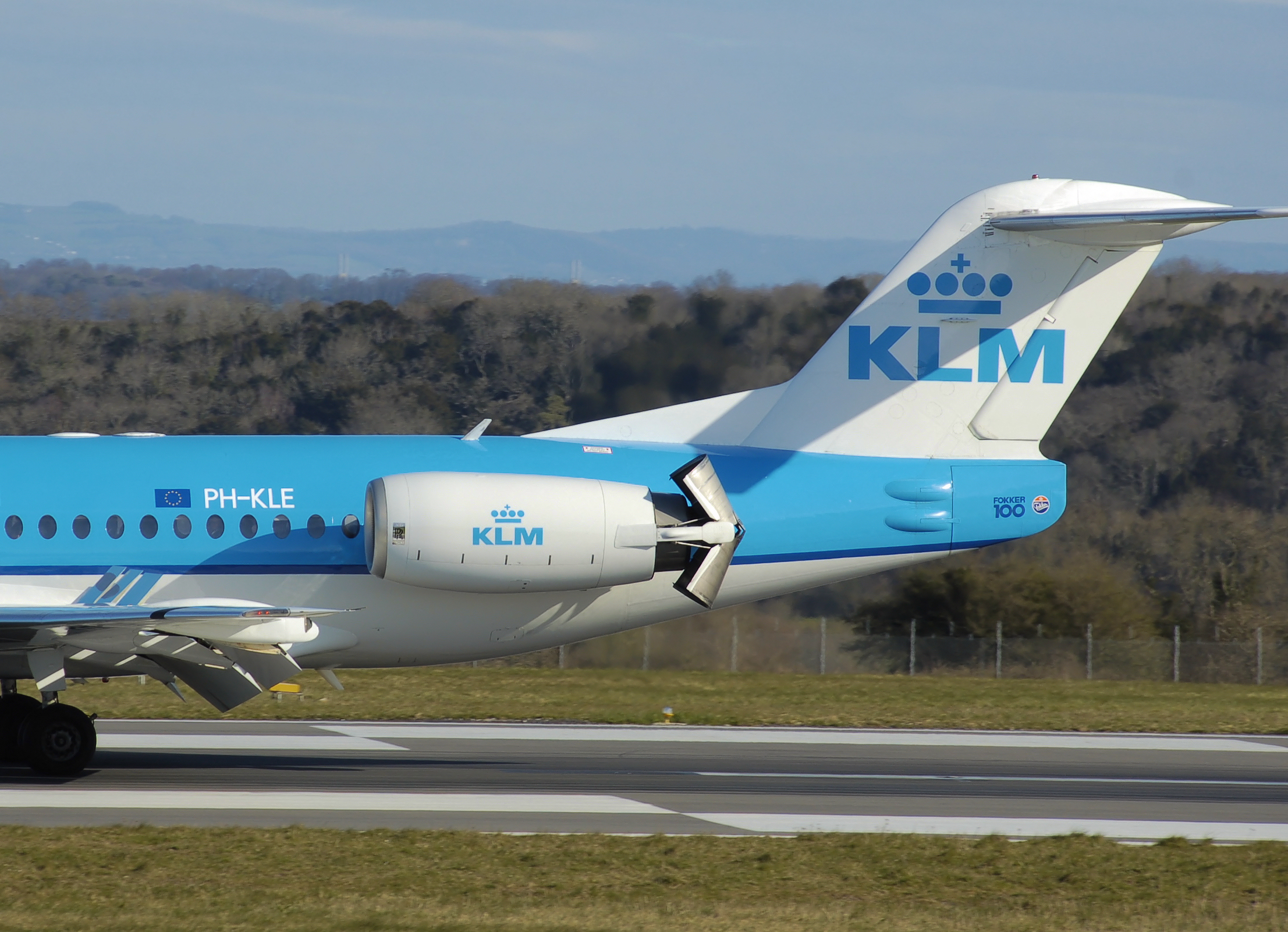
Target 'bucket' thrust reverser deployed on the Rolls Royce Tay engines of a Fokker 100

The target thrust reverser uses a pair of hydraulically operated bucket or clamshell type doors to reverse the hot gas stream. For forward thrust, these doors form the propelling nozzle of the engine. In the original implementation of this system on the Boeing 707, and still common today, two reverser buckets were hinged so when deployed they block the rearward flow of the exhaust and redirect it with a forward component. This type of reverser is visible at the rear of the engine during deployment.

==== Internal types ====
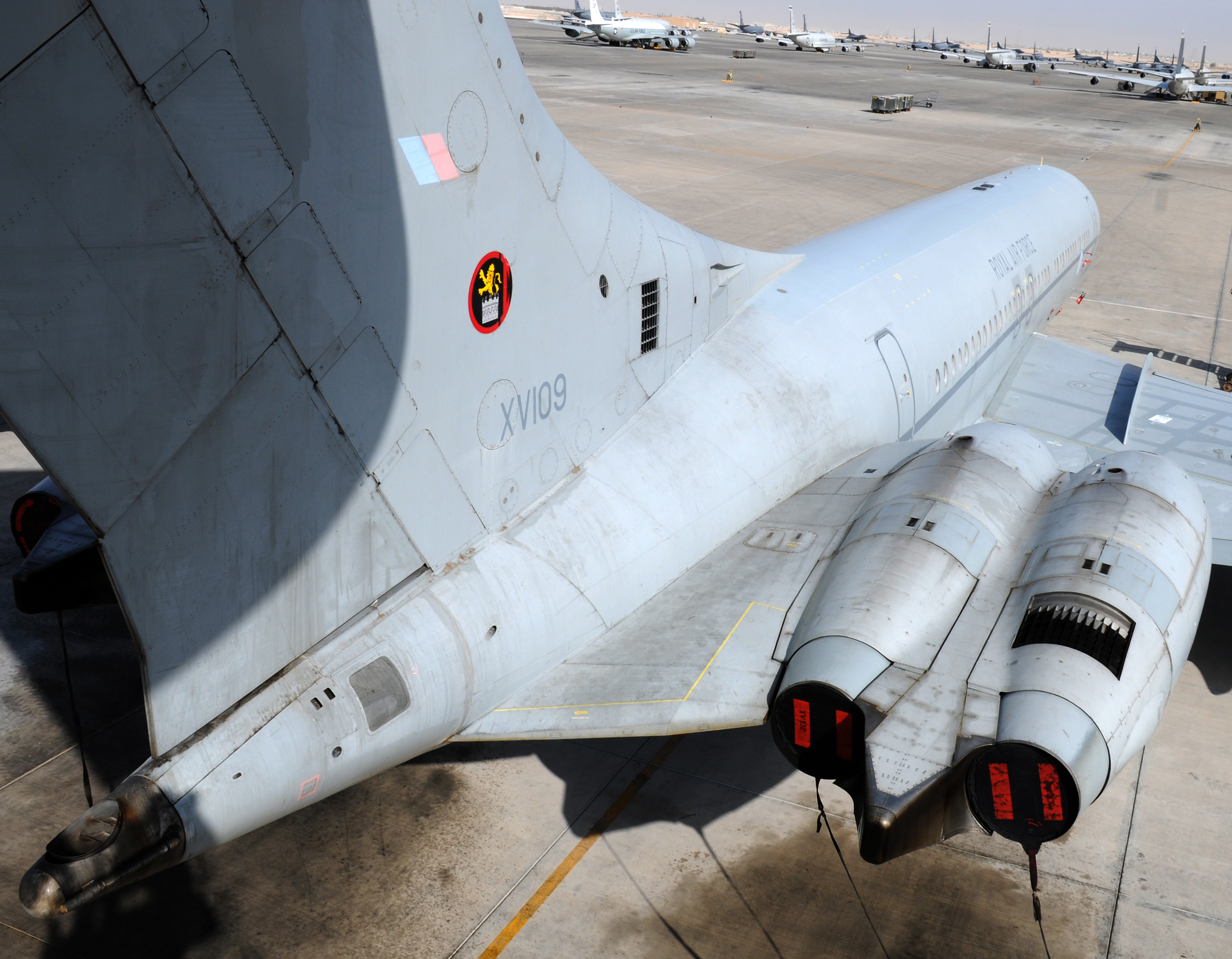
Clamshell outlet grating open (outboard engine) on a Rolls-Royce Conway turbofan of a Royal Air Force Vickers VC-10 tanker

Internal thrust reversers use deflector doors inside the engine shroud to redirect airflow through openings in the side of the nacelle. In turbojet and mixed-flow bypass turbofan engines, one type uses pneumatically operated clamshell deflectors to redirect engine exhaust. The reverser ducts may be fitted with cascade vanes to further redirect the airflow forward.

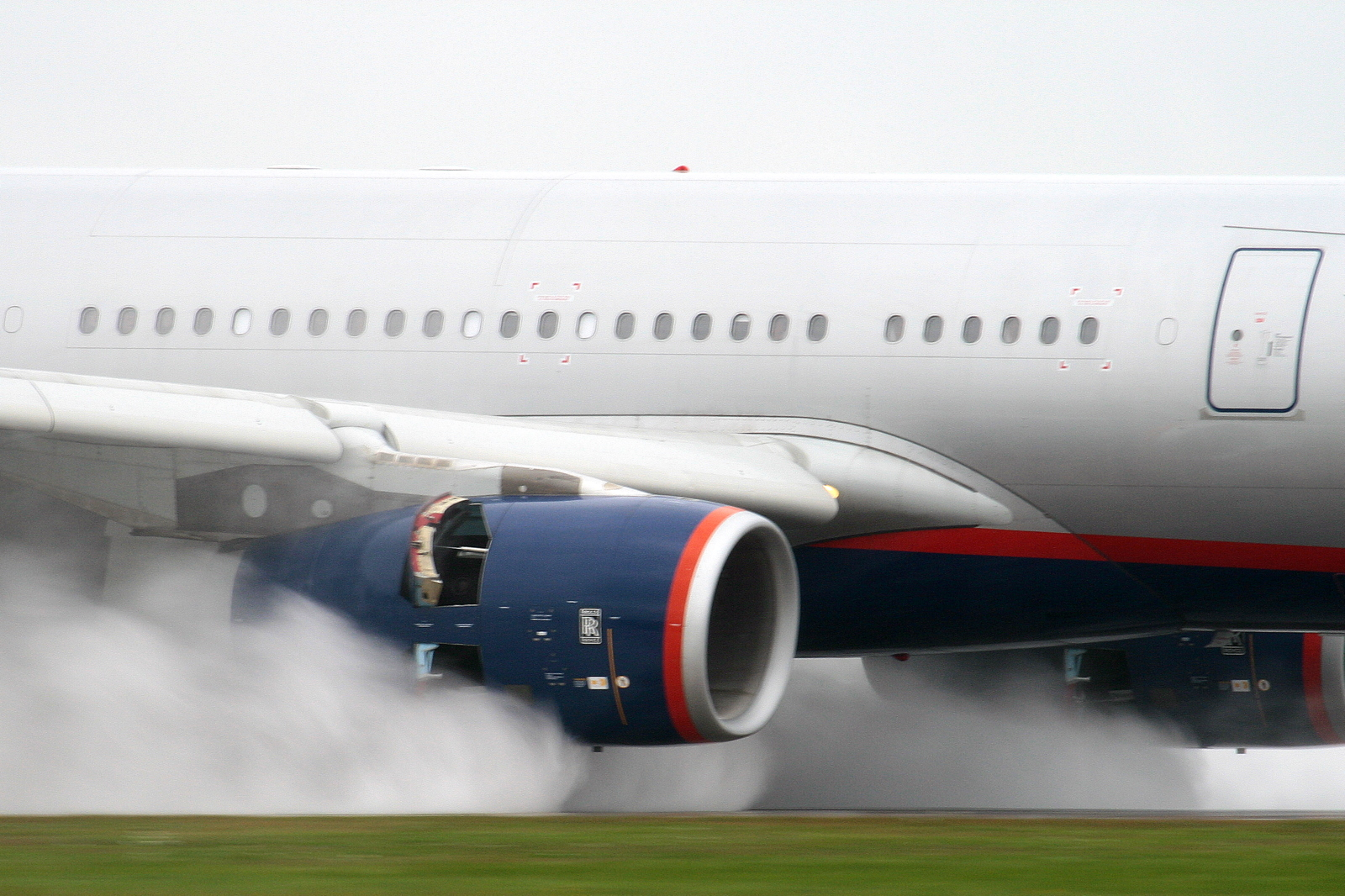
Pivot door-type thrust reversers deployed on the Rolls-Royce Trent 700 engine of an Airbus A330. The redirected thrust blows water from the wet surface, making the air flow observable.

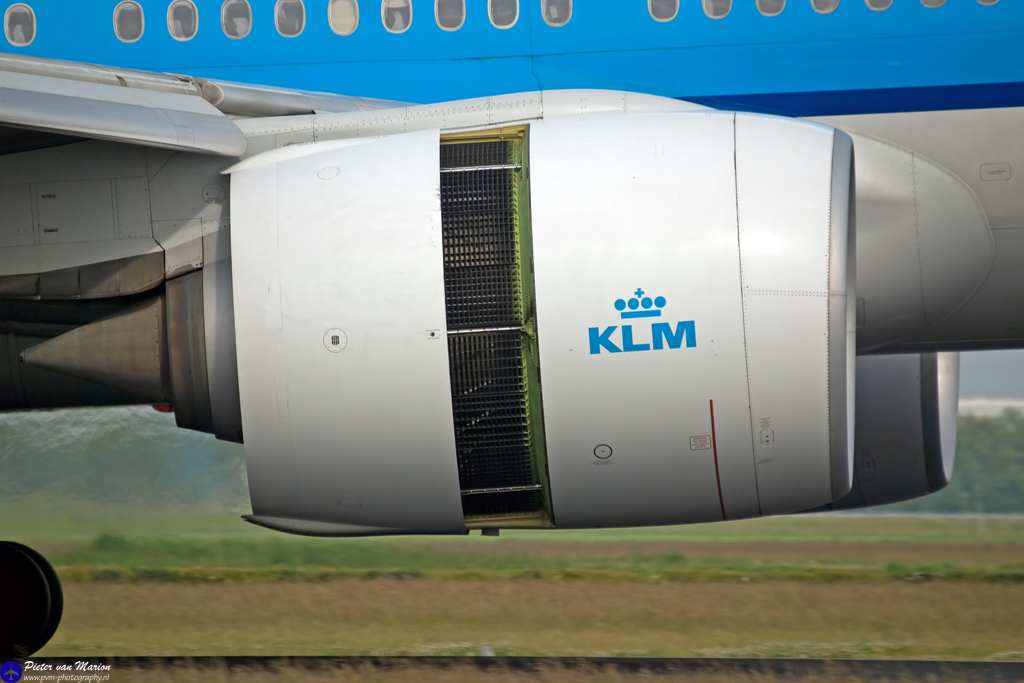
Cold-stream type thrust reverser being deployed on a Boeing 777-300

In contrast to the two types used on turbojet and low-bypass turbofan engines, many high-bypass turbofan engines use a cold-stream reverser. This design places the deflector doors in the bypass duct to redirect only the portion of the airflow from the engine's fan section that bypasses the combustion chamber. Engines such as the A320 and A340 versions of the CFM56 direct the airflow forward with a pivoting-door reverser similar to the internal clamshell used in some turbojets. Cascade reversers use a vane cascade that is uncovered by a sleeve around the perimeter of the engine nacelle that slides aft by means of an air motor. During normal operation, the reverse thrust vanes are blocked. On selection, the system folds the doors to block off the cold stream final nozzle and redirect this airflow to the cascade vanes.

In cold-stream reversers, the exhaust from the combustion chamber continues to generate forward thrust, making this design less effective. It can also redirect core exhaust flow if equipped with a hot stream spoiler. The cold stream cascade system is known for structural integrity, reliability and versatility, but can be heavy and difficult to integrate into nacelles housing large engines.

== Operation ==
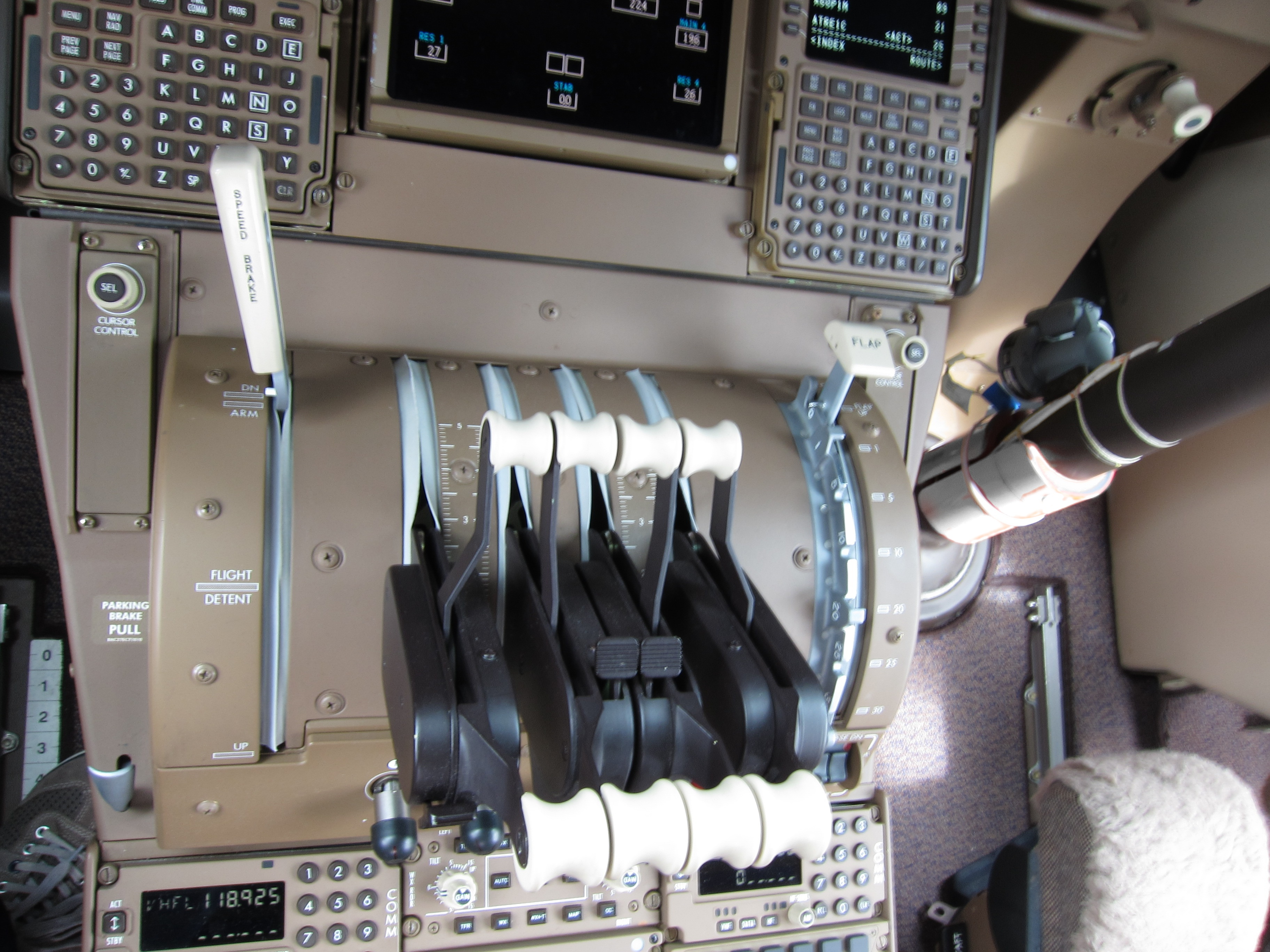
Reverse thrust levers forward of the main levers, seen on a Boeing 747-8

In most cockpit setups, reverse thrust is set when the thrust levers are on idle by pulling them farther back. Reverse thrust is typically applied immediately after touchdown, often along with spoilers, to improve deceleration early in the landing roll when residual aerodynamic lift and high speed limit the effectiveness of the brakes located on the landing gear. Reverse thrust is always selected manually, either using levers attached to the thrust levers or moving the thrust levers into a reverse thrust 'gate'.

The early deceleration provided by reverse thrust can reduce landing roll by a quarter or more. Regulations dictate, however, that an aircraft must be able to land on a runway without the use of thrust reversal in order to be certified to land there as part of scheduled airline service.

Once the aircraft's speed has slowed, reverse thrust is cancelled to prevent the reversed airflow from throwing debris in front of the engine intakes where it can be ingested, causing foreign object damage. If circumstances require it, reverse thrust can be used all the way to a stop, or even to provide thrust to push the aircraft backward, though aircraft tugs or towbars are more commonly used for that purpose. When reverse thrust is used to push an aircraft back from the gate, the maneuver is called a powerback. Some manufacturers warn against the use of this procedure during icy conditions as using reverse thrust on snow- or slush-covered ground can cause slush, water, and runway deicers to become airborne and adhere to wing surfaces.

If the full power of reverse thrust is not desirable, thrust reverse can be operated with the throttle set at less than full power, even down to idle power, which reduces stress and wear on engine components. Reverse thrust is sometimes selected on idling engines to eliminate residual thrust, in particular in icy or slick conditions, or when the engines' jet blast could cause damage.

=== Combat aircraft ===
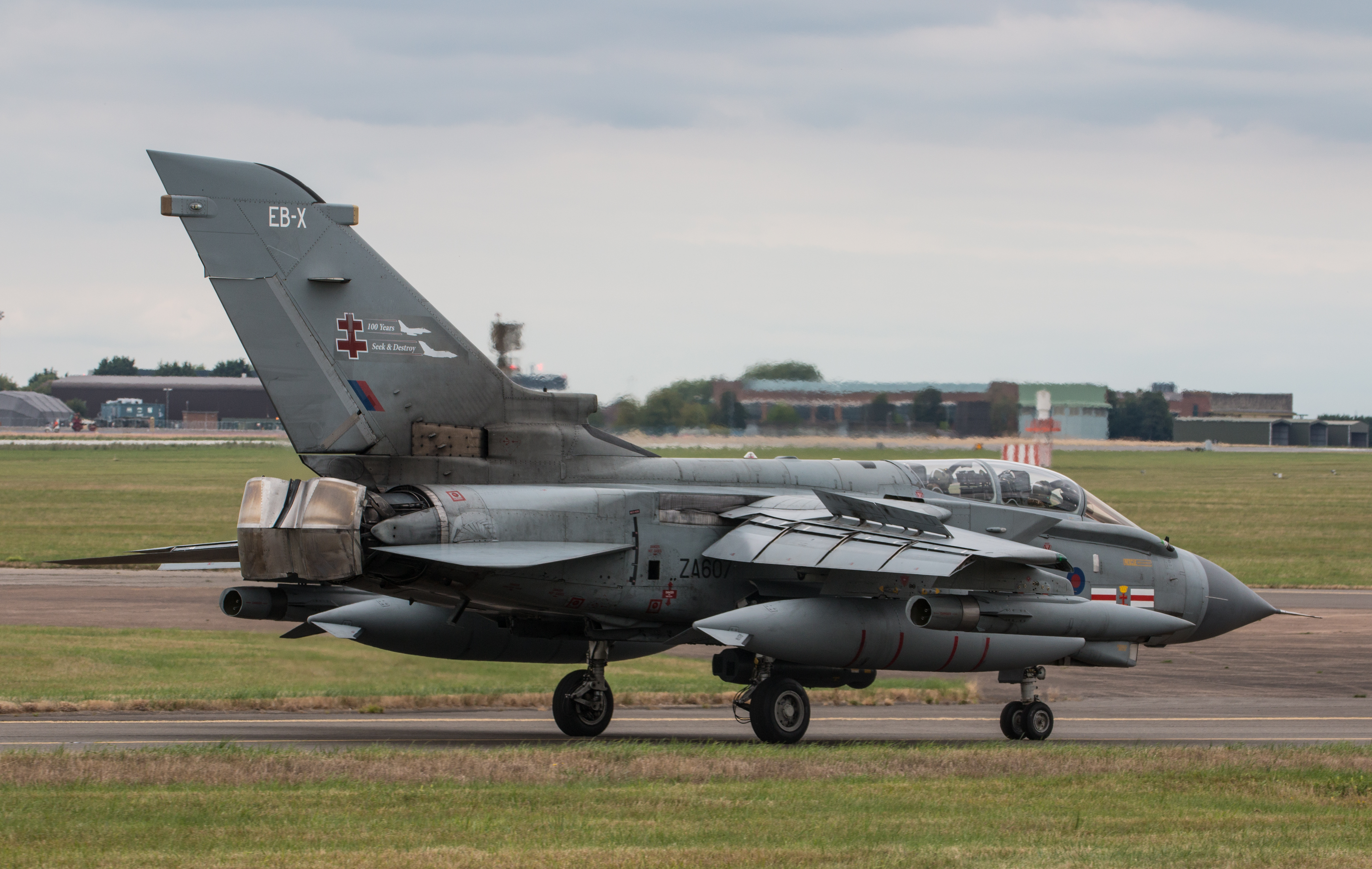
Tornado aircraft landing with reverse thrust.

The Panavia Tornado was equipped with thrust reversers which allowed it to operate from 900m runways, for take-off, with a landing run of 370m.

The Saab 37 Viggen (retired in November 2005) was equipped with reverse thrust for operation from 500 m landing strips, such as straight sections of Swedish roads which doubled as wartime runways.

=== In-flight operation ===
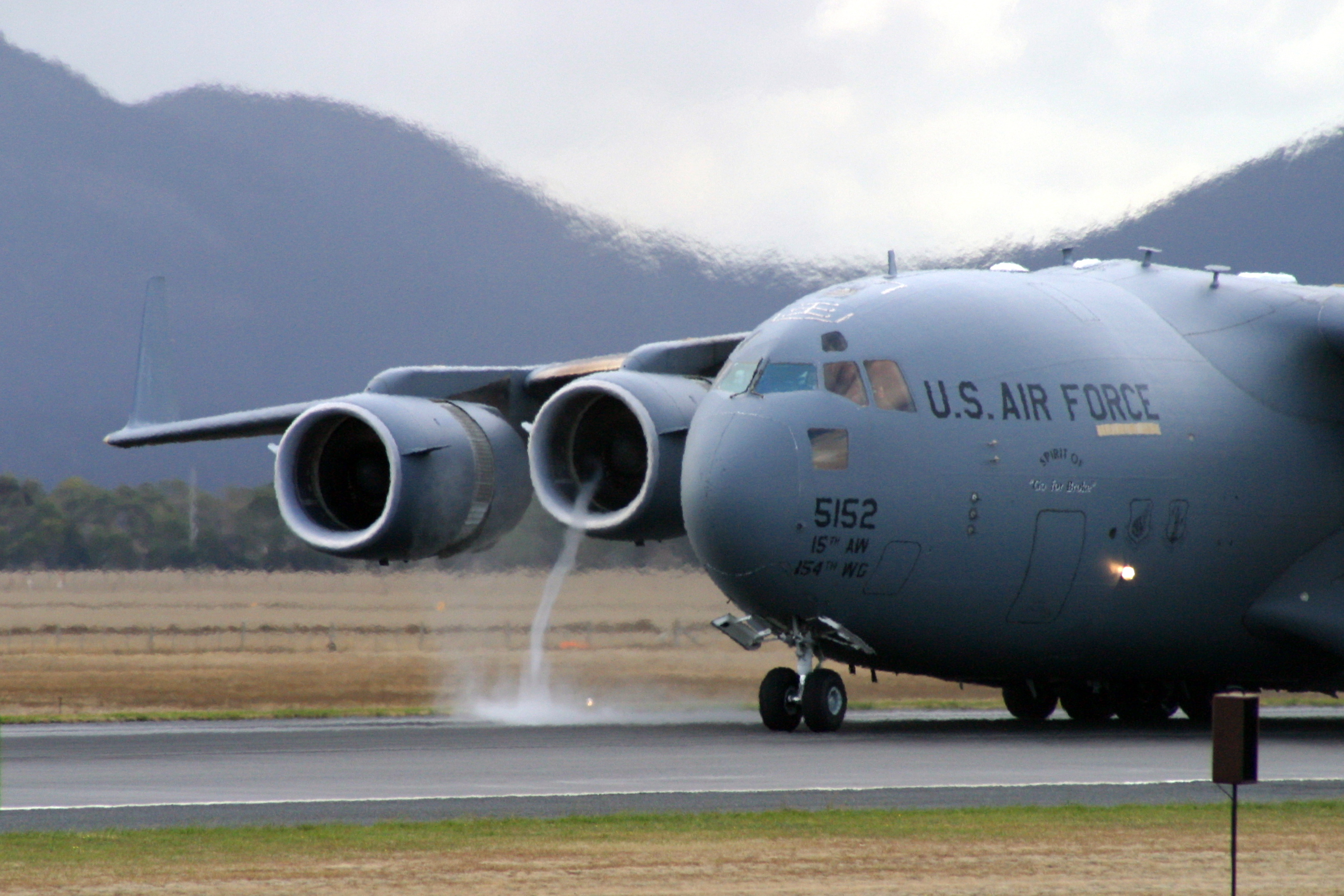
A vortex made visible as powerback is used on a Boeing C-17 Globemaster III. Ground vortices are formed by jet engines and propellers when operating close to the ground.

The Douglas DC-8 series of airliners was certified to use in-flight reverse thrust since service entry in 1959. Safe and effective for facilitating quick descents at acceptable speeds, it nonetheless produced significant aircraft buffeting, so actual use was less common on passenger flights and more common on cargo and ferry flights, where passenger comfort is not a concern.

The Hawker Siddeley Trident, a 120- to 180-seat airliner, was capable of descending at up to 10,000 ft/min (3,050 m/min) by use of reverse thrust, though this capability was rarely used.

The Aerospatiale-BAC Concorde supersonic airliner could use reverse thrust in the air to increase the rate of descent. Only the inboard engines were used, and the engines were placed in reverse idle only in subsonic flight.

The Boeing C-17 Globemaster III is one of the few modern aircraft that uses reverse thrust in flight. The Boeing-manufactured aircraft is capable of in-flight deployment of reverse thrust on all four engines to facilitate steep tactical descents up to 15,000 ft/min (4,600 m/min) into combat environments (a descent rate of just over 170 mph, or 274 km/h). The Lockheed C-5 Galaxy, introduced in 1969, also has in-flight reverse capability, although on the inboard engines only.

The Shuttle Training Aircraft, a highly modified Grumman Gulfstream II, used reverse thrust in flight to help simulate Space Shuttle aerodynamics so astronauts could practice landings. A similar technique was employed on a modified Tupolev Tu-154 which simulated the Russian Buran space shuttle.

A de Havilland Otter was modified for a STOL research program run by De Havilland Canada and the Defense Research Board of Canada. One of the modifications was the installation of a General Electric J85 turbojet in the fuselage with its exhaust direction controllable to provide extra drag for steep descents.

== Effectiveness ==
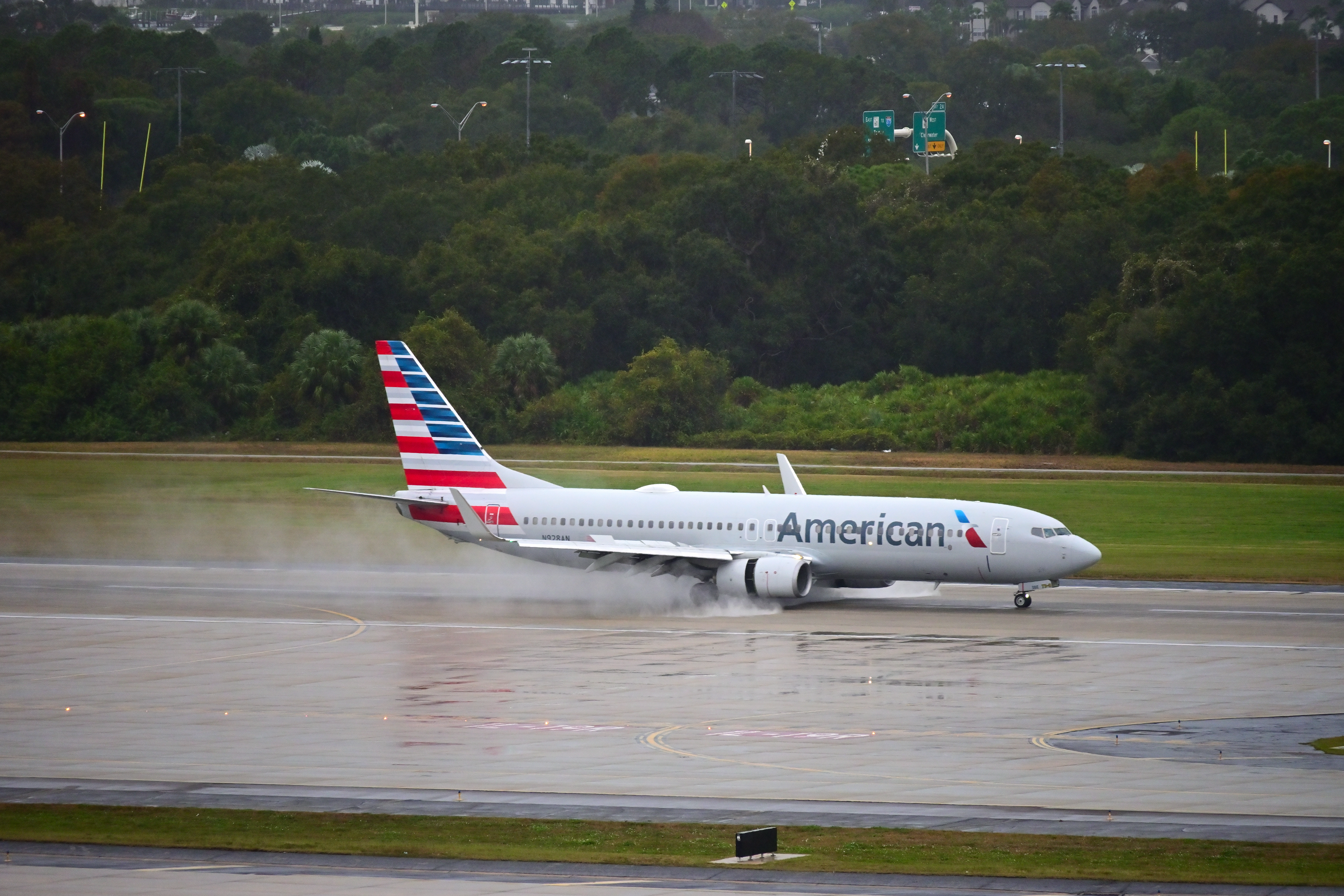
An American Airlines Boeing 737-800 using reverse thrust on a wet runway.

The amount of thrust and power generated are proportional to the speed of the aircraft, making reverse thrust more effective at high speeds. For maximum effectiveness, it should be applied quickly after touchdown. If activated at low speeds, foreign object damage is possible. There is some danger of an aircraft with thrust reversers applied momentarily leaving the ground again due to both the effect of the reverse thrust and the nose-up pitch effect from the spoilers. For aircraft susceptible to such an occurrence, pilots must take care to achieve a firm position on the ground before applying reverse thrust. If applied before the nose-wheel is in contact with the ground, there is a chance of asymmetric deployment causing an uncontrollable yaw towards the side of higher thrust, as steering the aircraft with the nose wheel is the only way to maintain control of the direction of travel in this situation.

Reverse thrust mode is used only for a fraction of aircraft operating time but affects it greatly in terms of design, weight, maintenance, performance, and cost. Penalties are significant but necessary since it provides stopping force for added safety margins, directional control during landing rolls, and aids in rejected take-offs and ground operations on contaminated runways where normal braking effectiveness is diminished. Airlines consider thrust reverser systems a vital part of reaching a maximum level of aircraft operating safety.

== Related accidents and incidents ==
In-flight deployment of reverse thrust has directly contributed to the crashes of several transport-type aircraft:

- On 4 July 1966, an Air New Zealand training flight using a Douglas DC-8-52 with the registration ZK-NZB crashed on takeoff from Auckland International Airport due to reverse thrust applied during a simulated failure of the no. 4 engine on takeoff. The crash killed 2 of the 5 crew on board.
- On 11 February 1978, Pacific Western Airlines Flight 314, a Boeing 737-200, crashed while executing a rejected landing at Cranbrook Airport. The left thrust reverser had not properly stowed; it deployed during the climbout, causing the aircraft to roll to the left and strike the ground. Out of 44 passengers and 5 crew members, only 6 passengers and a flight attendant survived.
- On 9 February 1982, Japan Airlines Flight 350 crashed 1,000 feet (300 m) short of the runway at Tokyo Haneda Airport following the intentional deployment of reverse thrust on two of the Douglas DC-8's four engines by the mentally unstable captain, resulting in 24 passenger deaths.
- On 29 August 1990, a United States Air Force Lockheed C-5 Galaxy crashed shortly after take-off from Ramstein Air Base in Germany. As the aircraft started to climb off the runway, one of the thrust reversers suddenly deployed. This resulted in loss of control of the aircraft and the subsequent crash. Of the 17 people on board, 4 survived the crash.
- On 26 May 1991, Lauda Air Flight 004, a Boeing 767-300ER, had an uncommanded deployment of the left engine's thrust reverser, which caused the airliner to go into a rapid dive and break up in mid-air. All 213 passengers and 10 crew were killed.
- On 31 October 1996, TAM Linhas Aéreas Flight 402, a Fokker 100, crashed shortly after take-off from Congonhas-São Paulo International Airport, São Paulo, Brazil, striking two apartment buildings and several houses. All 90 passengers and 6 crew members as well as 3 people on the ground died in the crash. The crash was attributed to the uncommanded deployment of a faulty thrust reverser on the right engine shortly after take-off.
- On 6 November 2002, Luxair Flight 9642, a Fokker 50, crashed while on approach to Luxembourg Airport. A total of 20 out of the 22 passengers and crew on board were killed. Investigators determined that the pilots had over-ridden safety interlocks in order to set the propellers to reverse thrust mode whilst in-flight, causing them to lose control of the aircraft.
- On 10 February 2004, Kish Air Flight 7170, a Fokker 50, crashed while on approach to Sharjah International Airport. A total of 43 out of the 46 passengers and crew on board were killed. Investigators determined that the pilots had prematurely set the propellers to reverse thrust mode, causing them to lose control of the aircraft.

== See also ==
- Index of aviation articles
- Afterburner
- Thrust vectoring
- Vertical take-off and landing
