= Pushback (aviation) =

Removal of an aircraft from an airport gate by external power

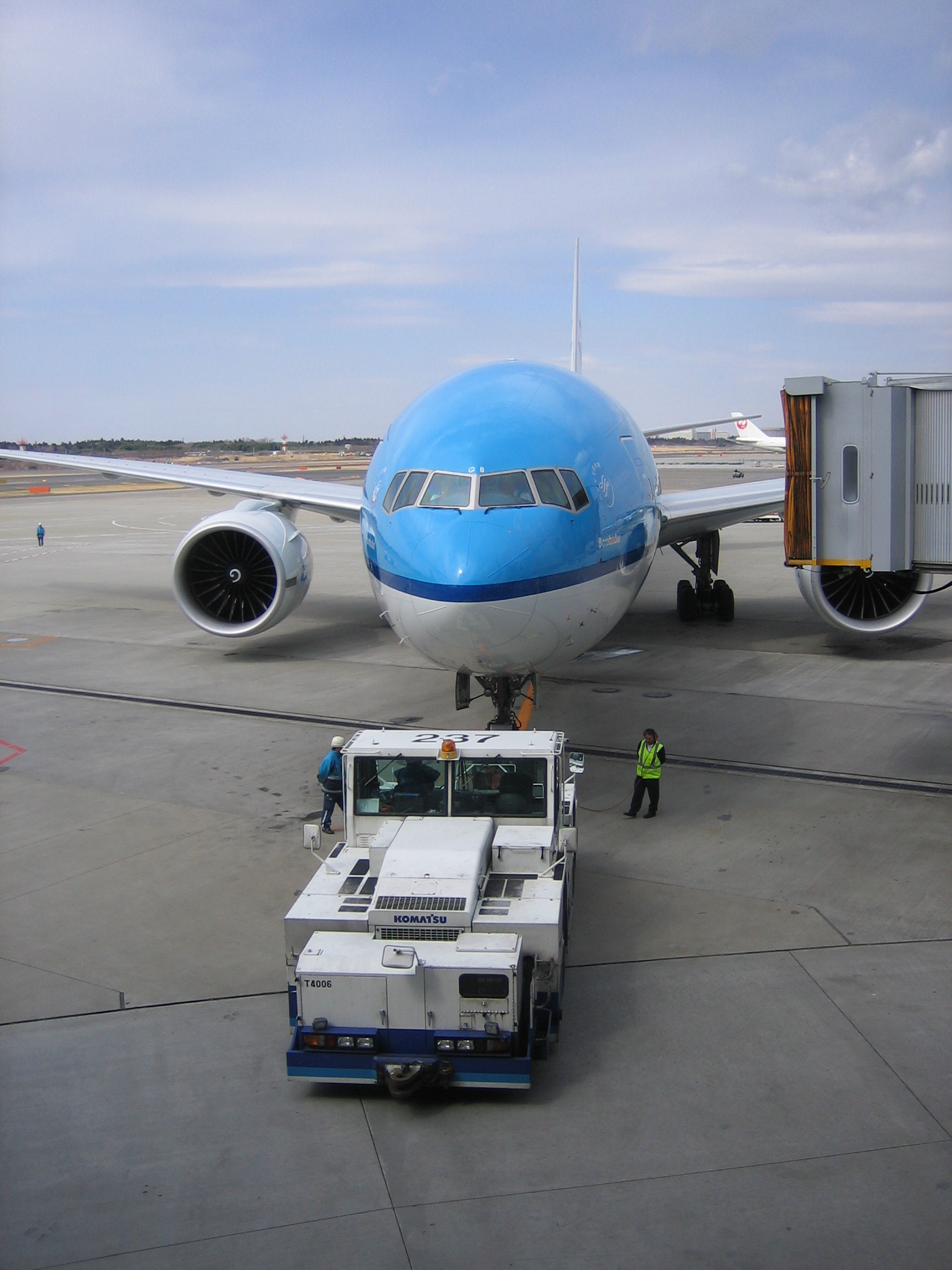
A KLM Boeing 777 being pushed back from a gate at Narita International Airport in Japan

In aviation, pushback is an airport procedure during which an aircraft is pushed backwards away from its parking position, usually at an airport gate by external power. Pushbacks are carried out by special, low-profile vehicles called pushback tractors or tugs.

Although many aircraft are capable of moving themselves backwards on the ground using reverse thrust (a procedure referred to as a powerback), increased noise, jet blast, prop wash, or flying debris can injure airport staff and damage buildings and equipment. Debris can also be sucked into engines, as it is in normal use, causing unnecessary wear; a major part of the wear on aircraft engines occurs during ground use. A pushback is therefore the preferred method when ground-handling aircraft.

== Definition ==
IATA defines aircraft pushback as "rearward moving of an aircraft from a parking position to a taxi position by use of specialized ground support equipment."

== Procedure ==
Airbus A380 pushback

Pushbacks at busy aerodromes are usually subject to ground control clearance to facilitate ground movement on taxiways. Once clearance is obtained, the pilot will communicate with the tractor driver (or a ground handler walking alongside the aircraft in some cases) to start the pushback. To communicate, a headset may be connected near the nose gear.

Since the pilots cannot see what is behind the aircraft, steering is done by the pushback tractor driver and not by the pilots. Depending on the aircraft type and airline procedure, a bypass pin may be temporarily installed into the nose gear to disconnect it from the aircraft's normal steering mechanism.

Once the pushback is completed, the towbar is disconnected, and any bypass pin removed. The ground handler will show the bypass pin to the pilots to make it clear that it has been removed. The pushback is then complete, and the aircraft can taxi forward under its own power.

== Equipment ==
=== Moving light aircraft ===
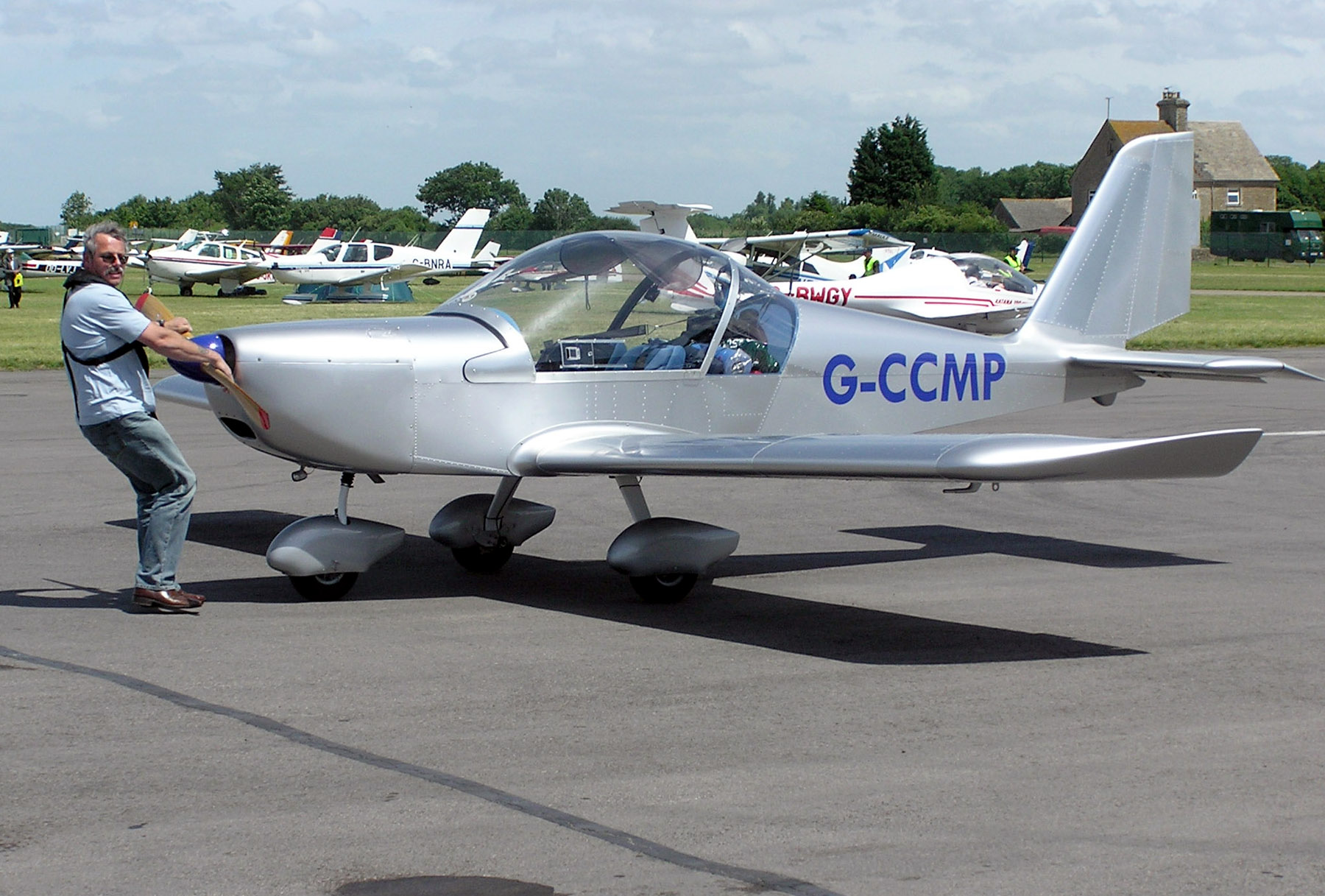
Light aircraft can usually be moved by human power alone. Here, this Aerotechnik EV-97A Eurostar is being pulled into position for refueling.

Very small airplanes may be moved by human power alone. The airplane may be pushed or pulled by landing gear or wing struts since they're known to be strong enough to drag the airplane through the air. To allow for turns, a person may either pick up or push down on the tail to raise either the nose wheel or tail wheel off the ground, then rotate the airplane by hand. A less cumbersome method involves attaching a short tow bar to either the nose wheel or tail wheel, which provides a solid handhold and leverage to steer with, as well as eliminates the danger of handling the propeller. These tow bars are usually a lightweight aluminum alloy construction which allows them to be carried on board the airplane. Other small tow bars have a powered wheel to help move the airplane, with power sources as diverse as lawnmower engines or battery-operated electric drills. However, powered tow bars are usually too large and heavy to be practically carried on small airplanes.

=== Tractors and towbars ===
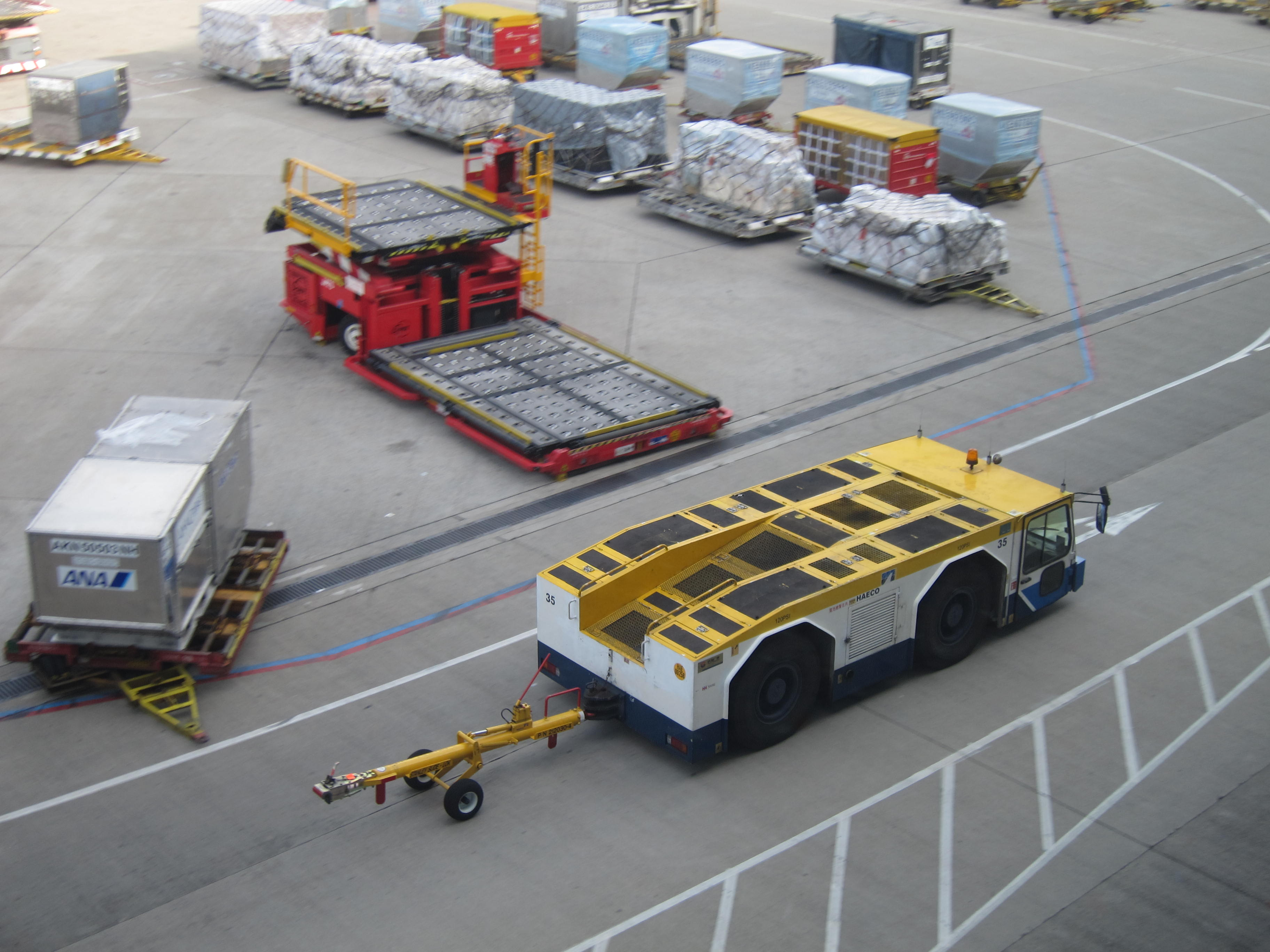
Pushback tug with a towbar on the apron

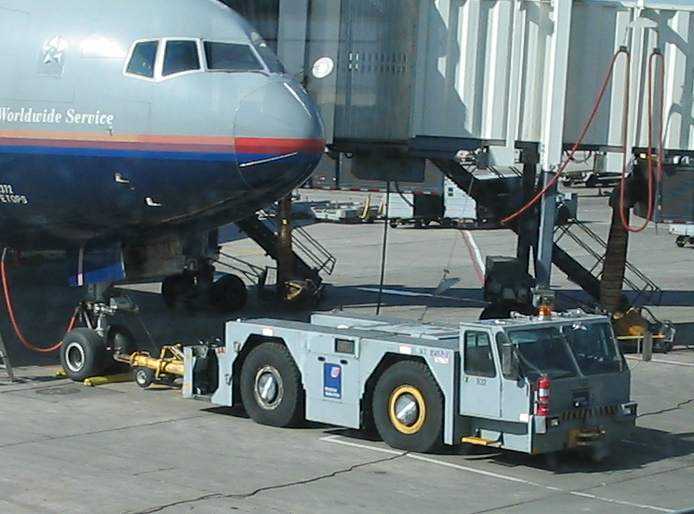
A conventional tractor hooked up to a United Airlines Boeing 777-200ER at Denver International Airport

Large aircraft cannot be moved by hand and must have a tractor or tug. Pushback tractors use a low profile design to fit under the aircraft nose. For sufficient traction the tractor must be heavy, and most models can have extra ballast added. A typical tractor for large aircraft weighs up to 54 tonnes (59.5 short tons; 53.1 long tons; 119,000 pounds) and has a drawbar pull of 334 kN (75,000 lbf). Often the driver's cabin can be raised for increased visibility when reversing and lowered to fit under aircraft. There are two types of pushback tractors: conventional and towbarless (TBL).

Conventional tugs use tow bars to connect to the nose landing gear of aircraft. The tow bar is fixed laterally at the nose landing gear but may move vertically slightly. At the end that attaches to the tug, the tow bar may pivot freely laterally and vertically. In this manner the tow bar acts as a large lever to rotate the nose landing gear. Each aircraft type has a unique tow fitting so the towbar also acts as an adapter between the standard-sized tow pin on the tug and the type-specific fitting on the aircraft's landing gear. The tow bar must be long enough to place the tug far away enough to avoid hitting the aircraft and to provide sufficient leverage to facilitate turns. On heavy tow bars for large aircraft the towbar rides on its own wheels when not connected to an aircraft. The wheels are attached to a hydraulic jacking mechanism which can lift the towbar to the correct height to mate to both the airplane and the tug, and once this is accomplished the same mechanism is used in reverse to raise the tow bar wheels from the ground during the pushback process. The tow bar can be connected at the front or the rear of the tractor, depending on whether the aircraft will be pushed or pulled. The towbar has a shear pin which prevents the aircraft from being mishandled by the tug; when overstressed the shear pin will snap, disconnecting the bar from the nose gear to prevent damage to the aircraft and tug.

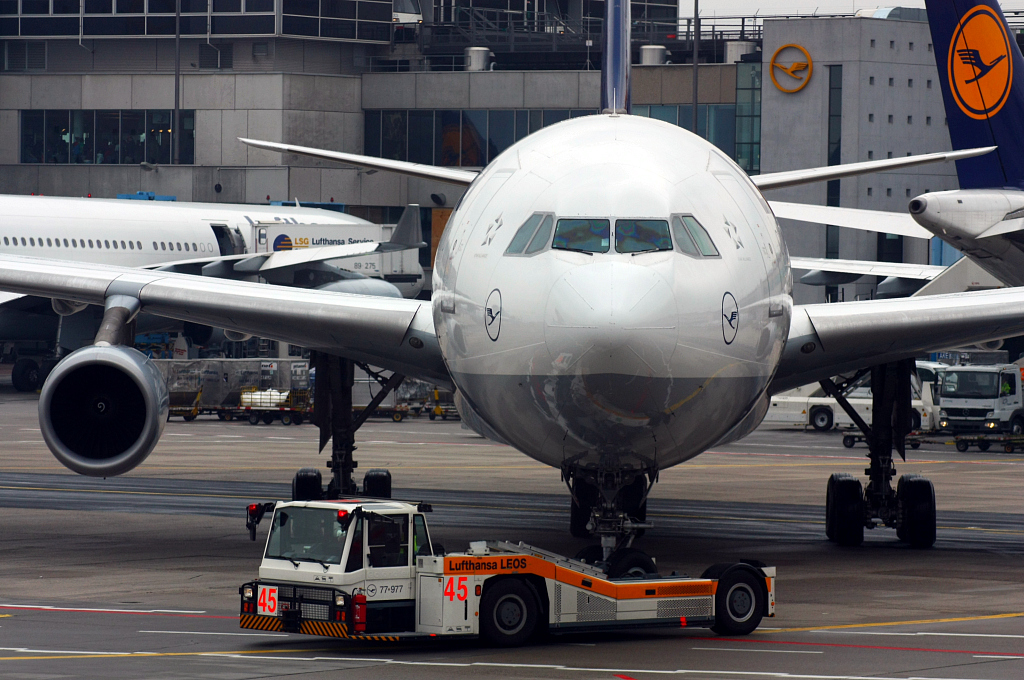
A towbarless tug at Frankfurt Airport transporting a Lufthansa Airbus A340-300

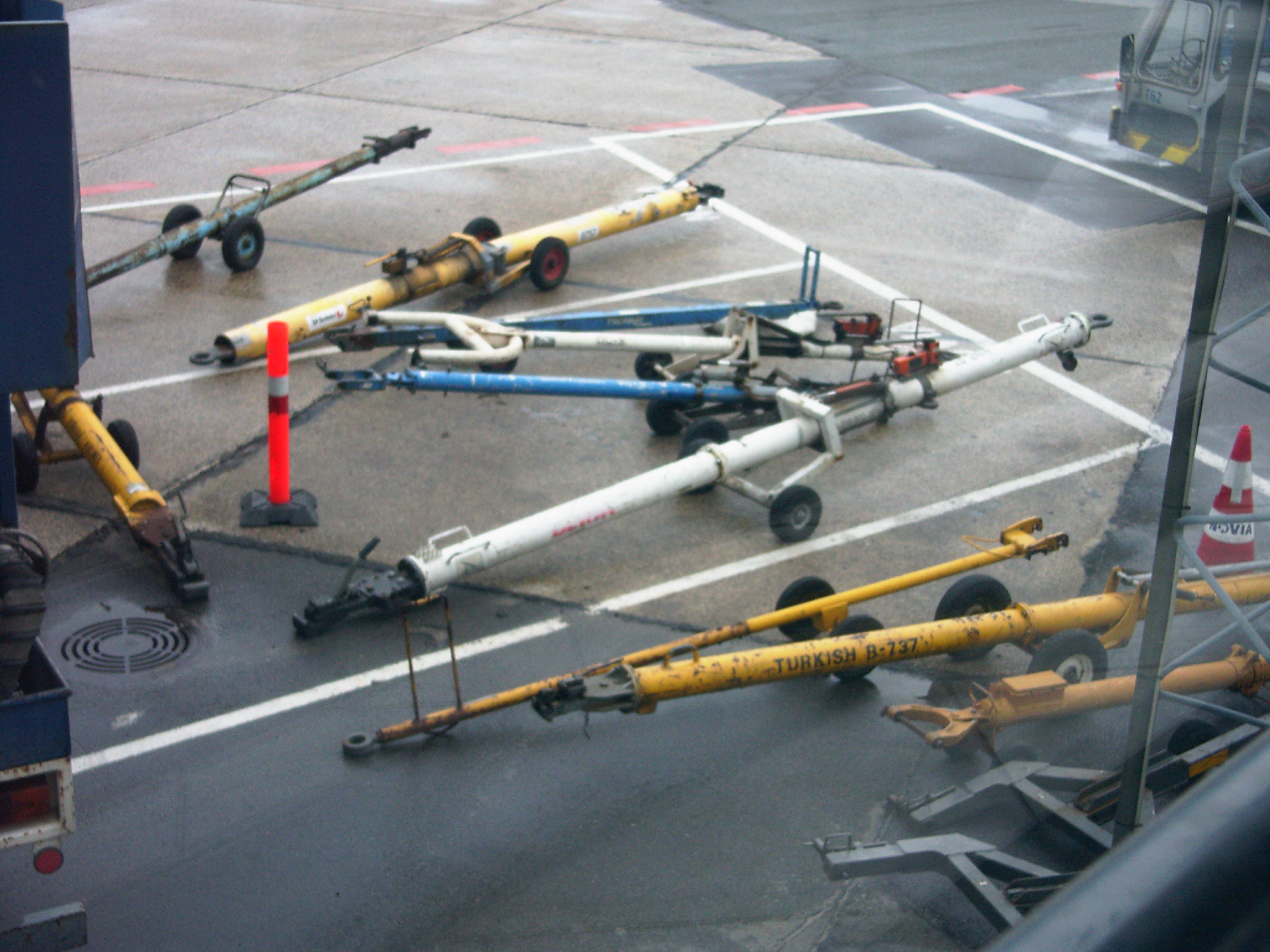
Towbars are used to connect tractors to aircraft.

Towbarless (TBL) tractors do not use towbars; they scoop up the nose landing gear and lift it off the ground. This avoids the time penalty of connecting and disconnecting a towbar and entirely removes the cost and complexity of maintaining towbars on the ramp. The tug itself does not need to be particularly massive – the aircraft's nosewheel weight provides the necessary downward force. Lastly, a TBL tug is much shorter (compared to a tug+towbar system) and has only a single pivot point instead of one at either end of the towbar, so it has much simpler and more precise control of the aircraft. This is very useful in general aviation settings with a wider variety of aircraft in more confined spaces than their airline counterparts.

Manufacturers of electric TBL tugs offer models capable of moving any aircraft from the smallest single-engine type to narrow-body airliners and military cargo and airline-sized business jets. Just as specialized towbars are required for a wide range of aircraft, many TBL tugs use adapters which enable the movement of many unique aircraft. The majority of aircraft do not require adapters and can be moved without any special adjustments to the tug. This is in contrast to conventional tugs which often use so-called "universal" towbars which must be adjustable to suit many aircraft types. Electric TBL tugs are gaining popularity among general aviation operators and FBOs as an alternative to gas or diesel-powered conventional tugs. Being electric rather than internal combustion-powered, electric tugs are low-emission which is a major advantage for environmentally-conscious operators; this also enables the tug to be safely operated inside a closed hangar.

=== Robotic tractor/tug ===
The Lahav Division of Israel Aerospace Industries has developed a semi-robotic towbarless tractor it calls TaxiBot that can tow an aircraft from the terminal gate to the take-off point (taxi-out phase) and return it to the gate after landing (taxi-in phase). The TaxiBot eliminates the use of airplane engines during taxi-in and until immediately prior to take-off during taxi-out, potentially saving a lot of fuel. The TaxiBot is remote controlled by the pilot from the cockpit using the regular pilot controls.

== Other equipment applications ==
While the vehicle is referred to as a pushback tug, it is also used to tow aircraft in areas where taxiing the aircraft is not practical or is unsafe, such as moving aircraft in and out of maintenance hangars, or moving aircraft that are not under their own power.

Some airlines, notably Virgin Atlantic, advocated towing aircraft to the holding point of the runway to save fuel and reduce environmental impact. However, the practice was discontinued after landing gear maintenance costs increased due to the stress put on the landing gear during the towing process.

Some fuel must still be burned to operate the auxiliary power unit to provide electrical and pneumatic power to run lighting, environmental and communications systems, unless the tug itself provides these sources of power, which some do. This method also places a larger workload on ground crews and equipment, especially if the aircraft and tow tractor ends up having to wait in a long line of aircraft.

== In media ==
In an advertising campaign, also documented on the television show Fifth Gear, a Volkswagen Touareg was used to pull a Boeing 747. As cited before, the "tractor" needs to be heavy to aid traction. The Touareg carried 4.3 tons worth of cement bags, and the tires were inflated to twice the normal pressure to handle the extra weight. Tractor tires have high sidewall ratios for that reason. This is the world record for the heaviest load towed by a production car.

== Gallery ==
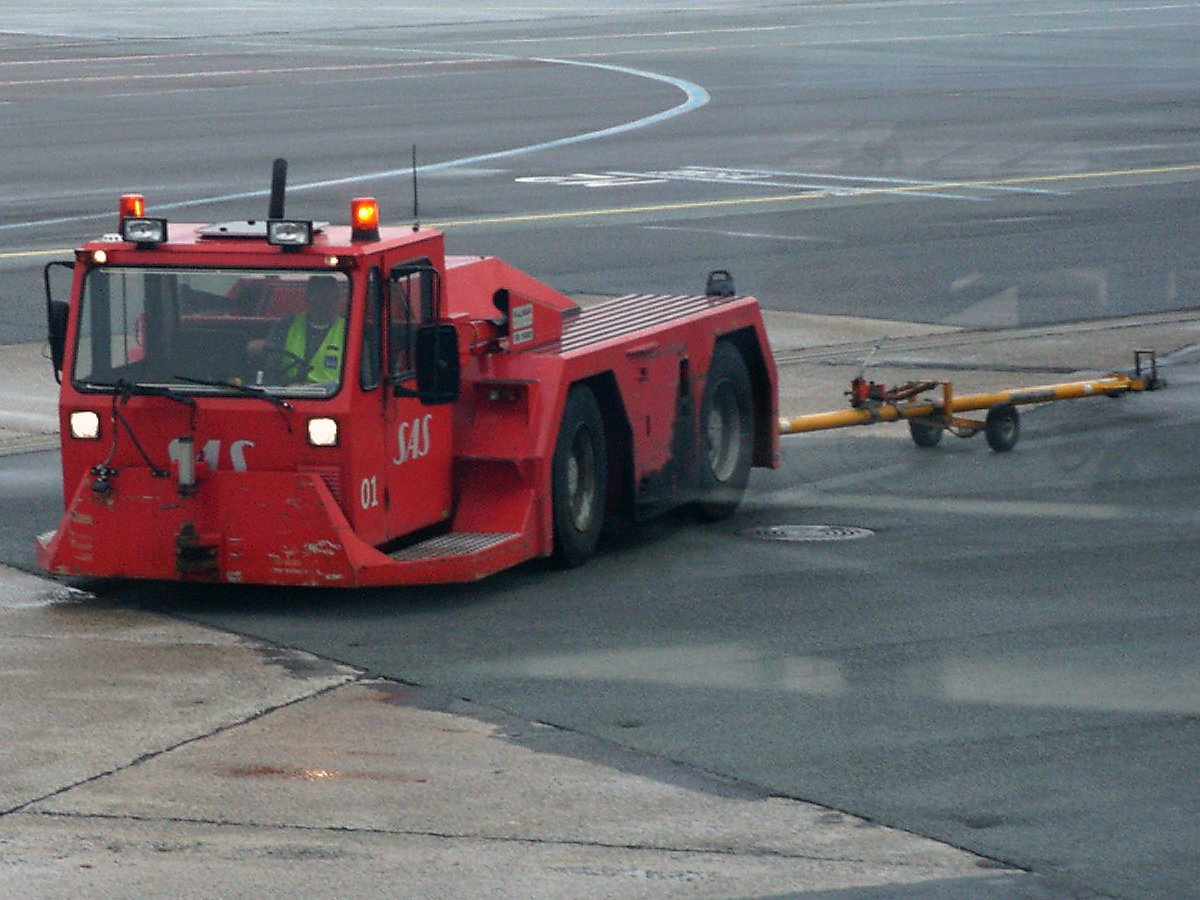
Pushback tug with the towbar behind

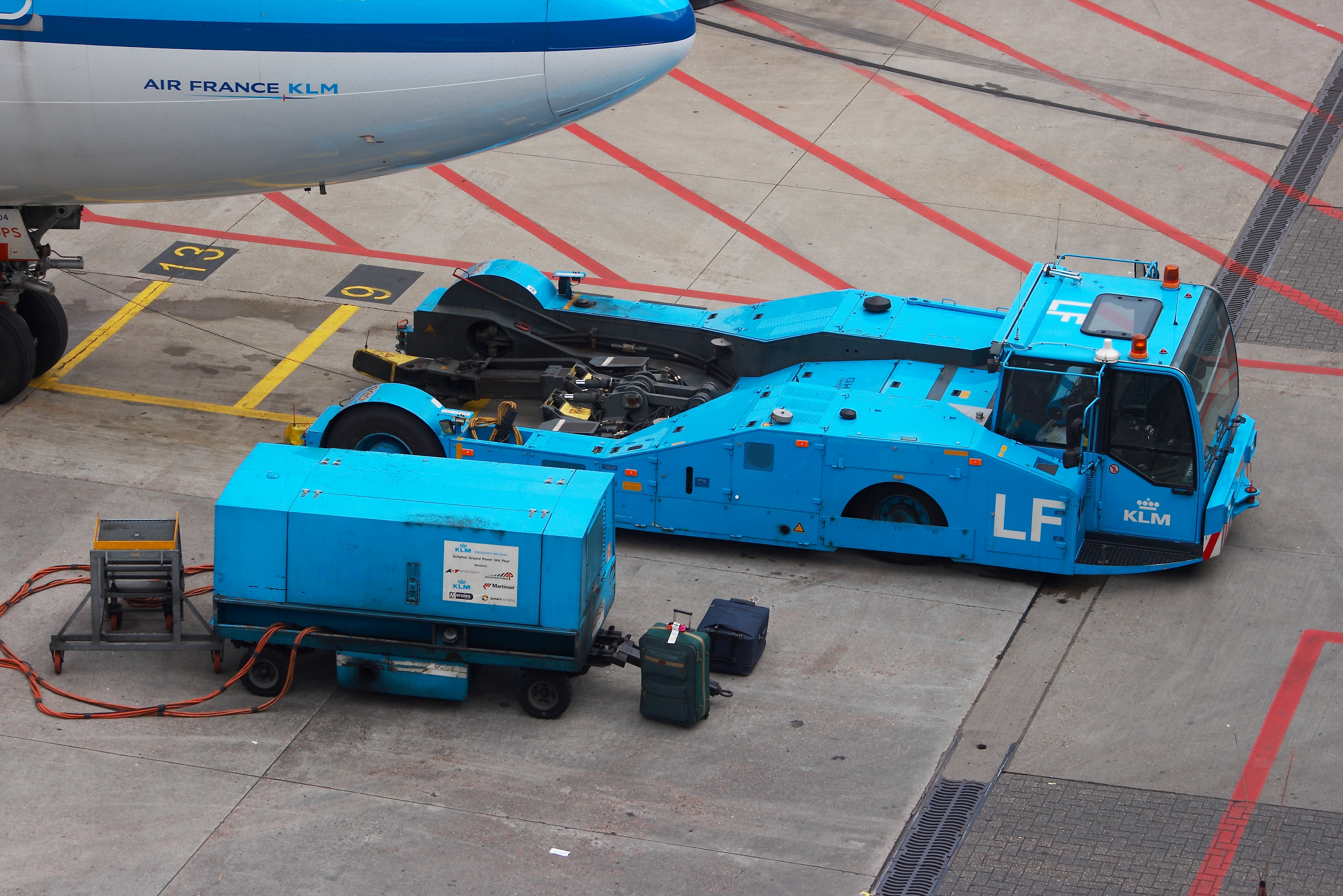
Towbarless tractor

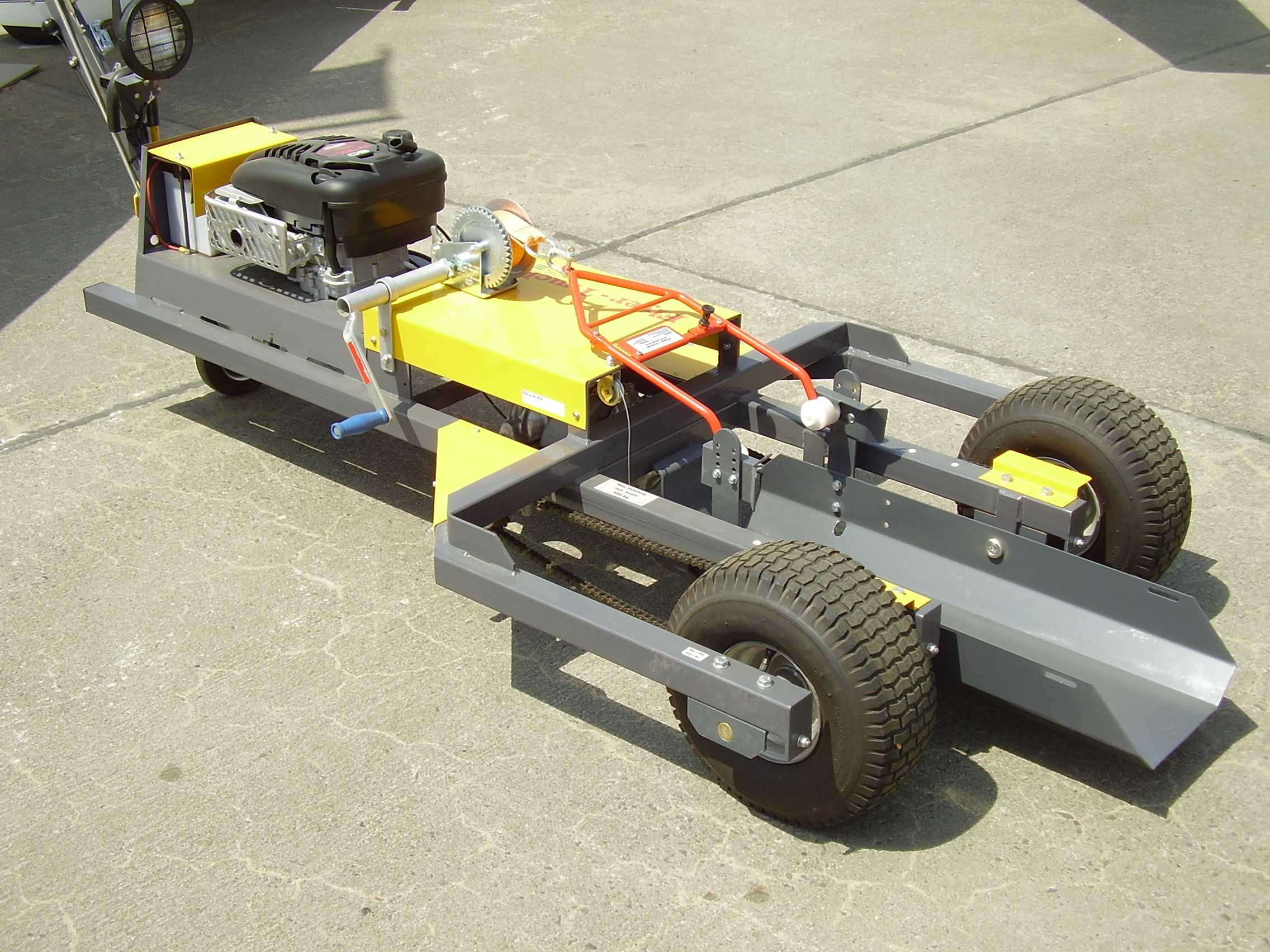
Towbarless tractor for smaller aircraft

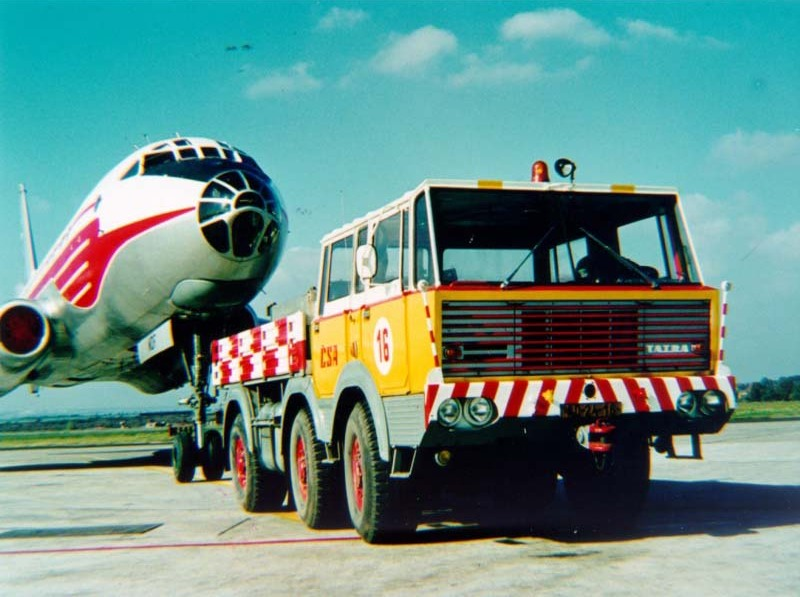
A Tatra T813 6×6 Airport tug

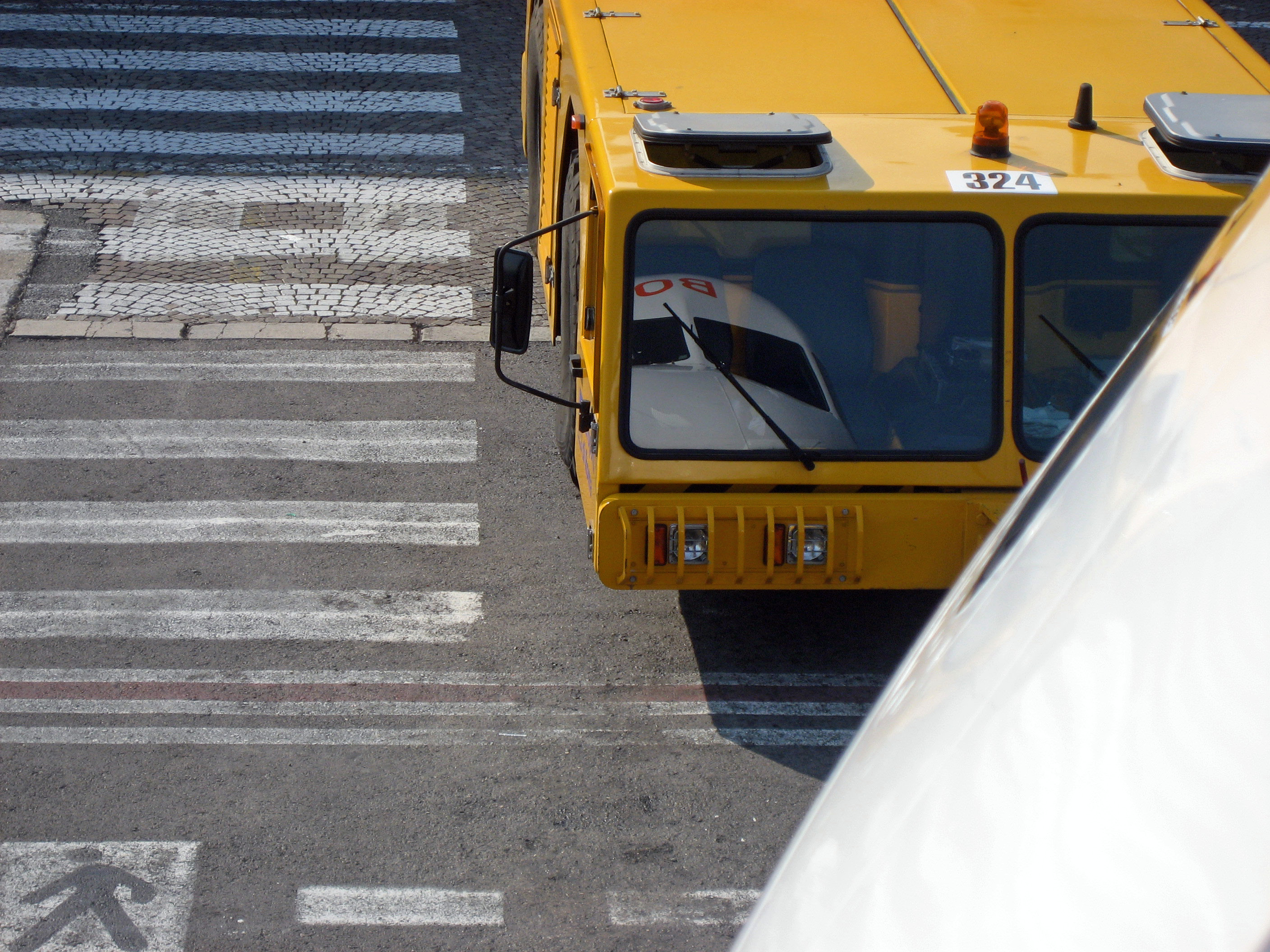
A tug ready to push back an EasyJet Airbus A319

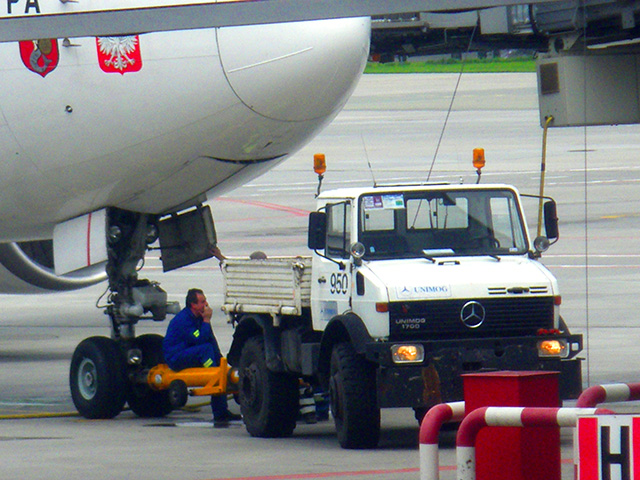
A Unimog being used as a pushback tractor

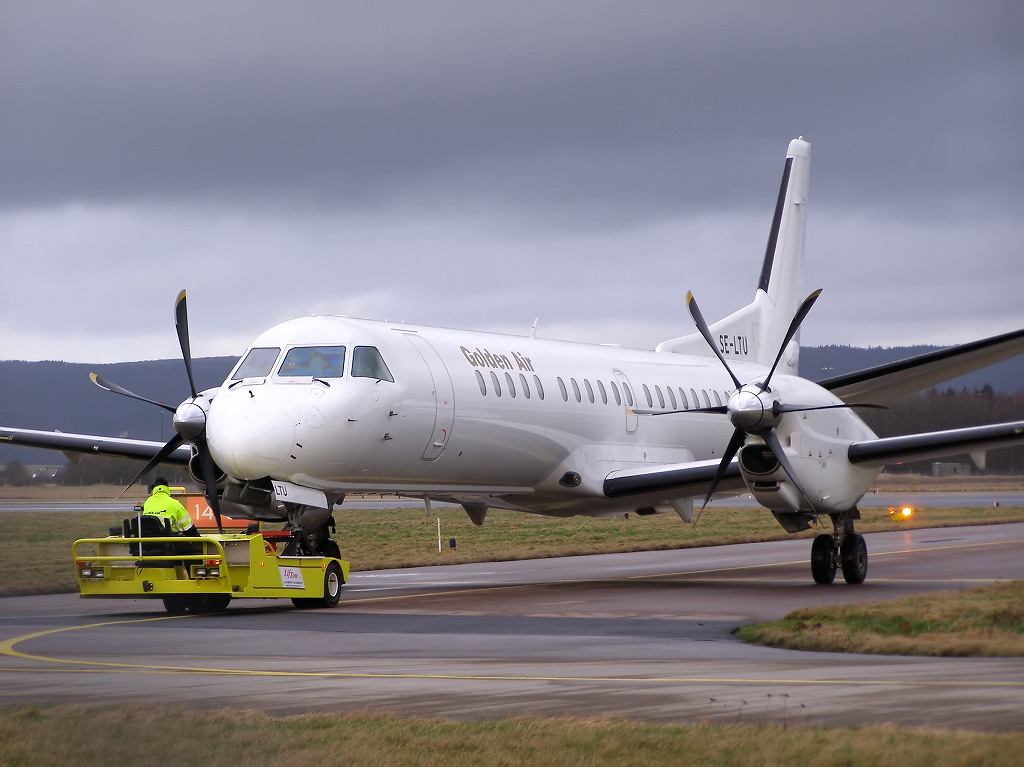
A Saab 2000 being towed by a small tow tractor at Ängelholm-Helsingborg Airport

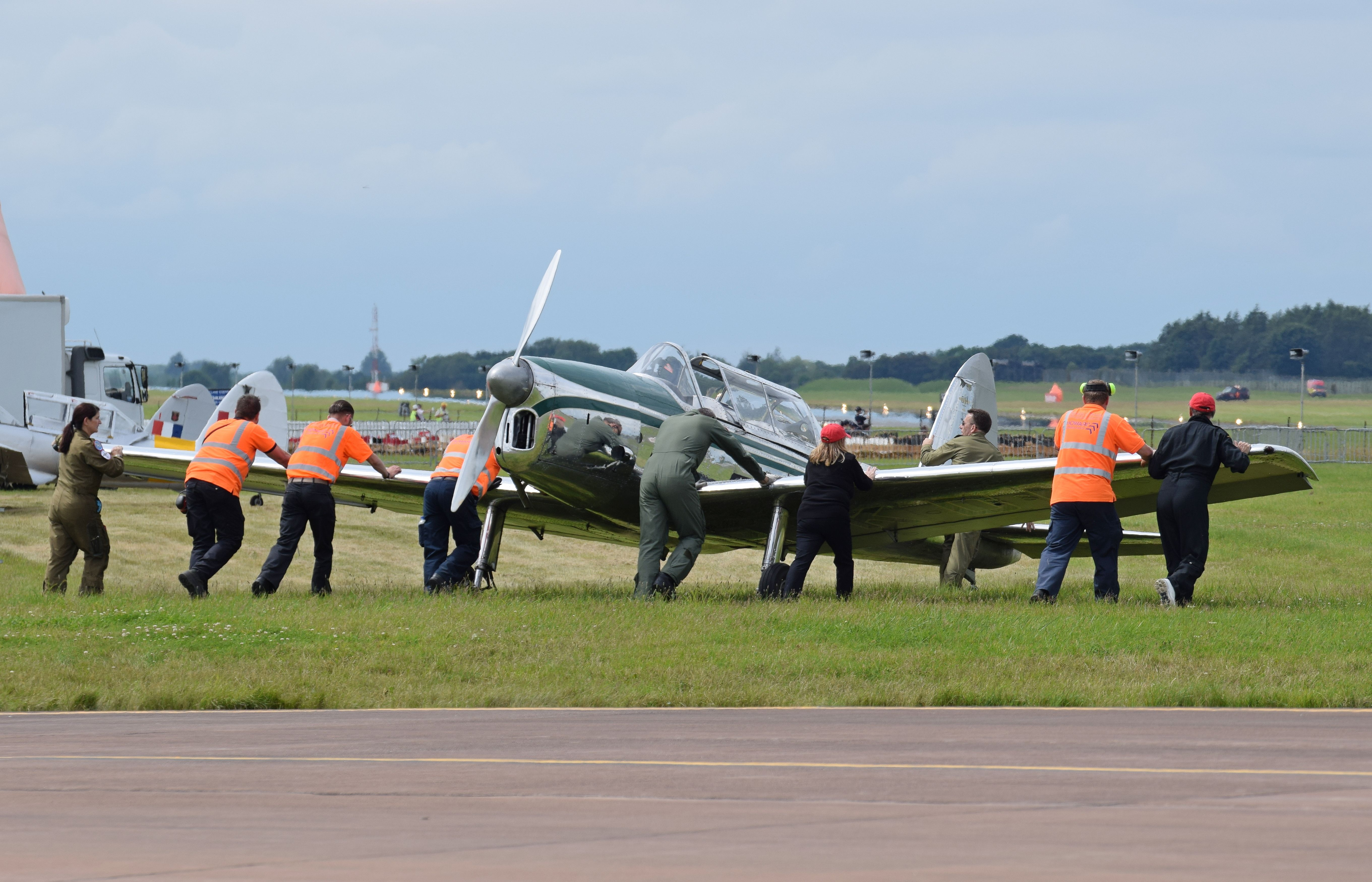
de Havilland Chipmunk manually ground-handled at the 2016 Royal International Air Tattoo, England

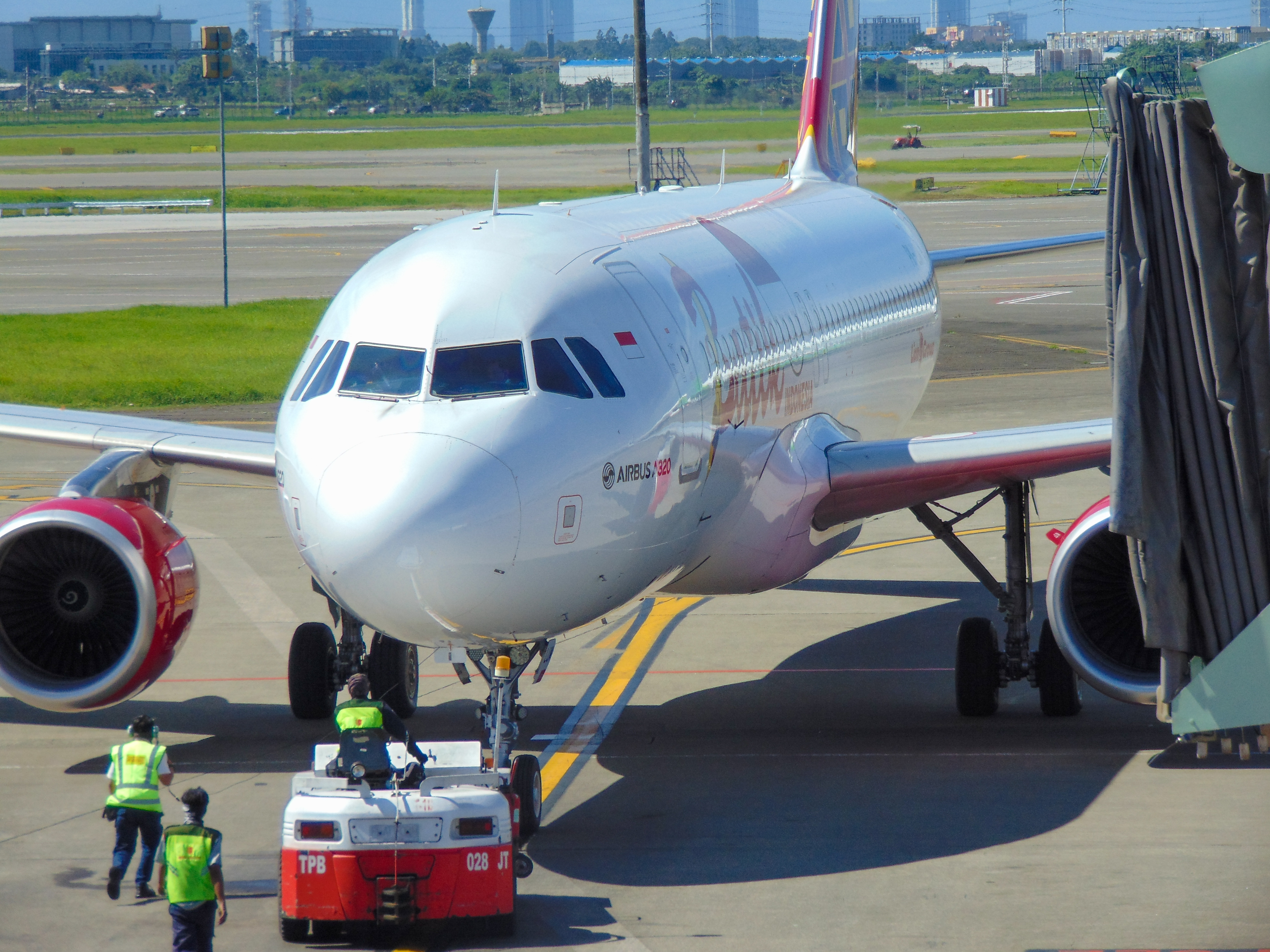
An Indonesia Batik air A320 on pushback at Soekarno–Hatta International Airport

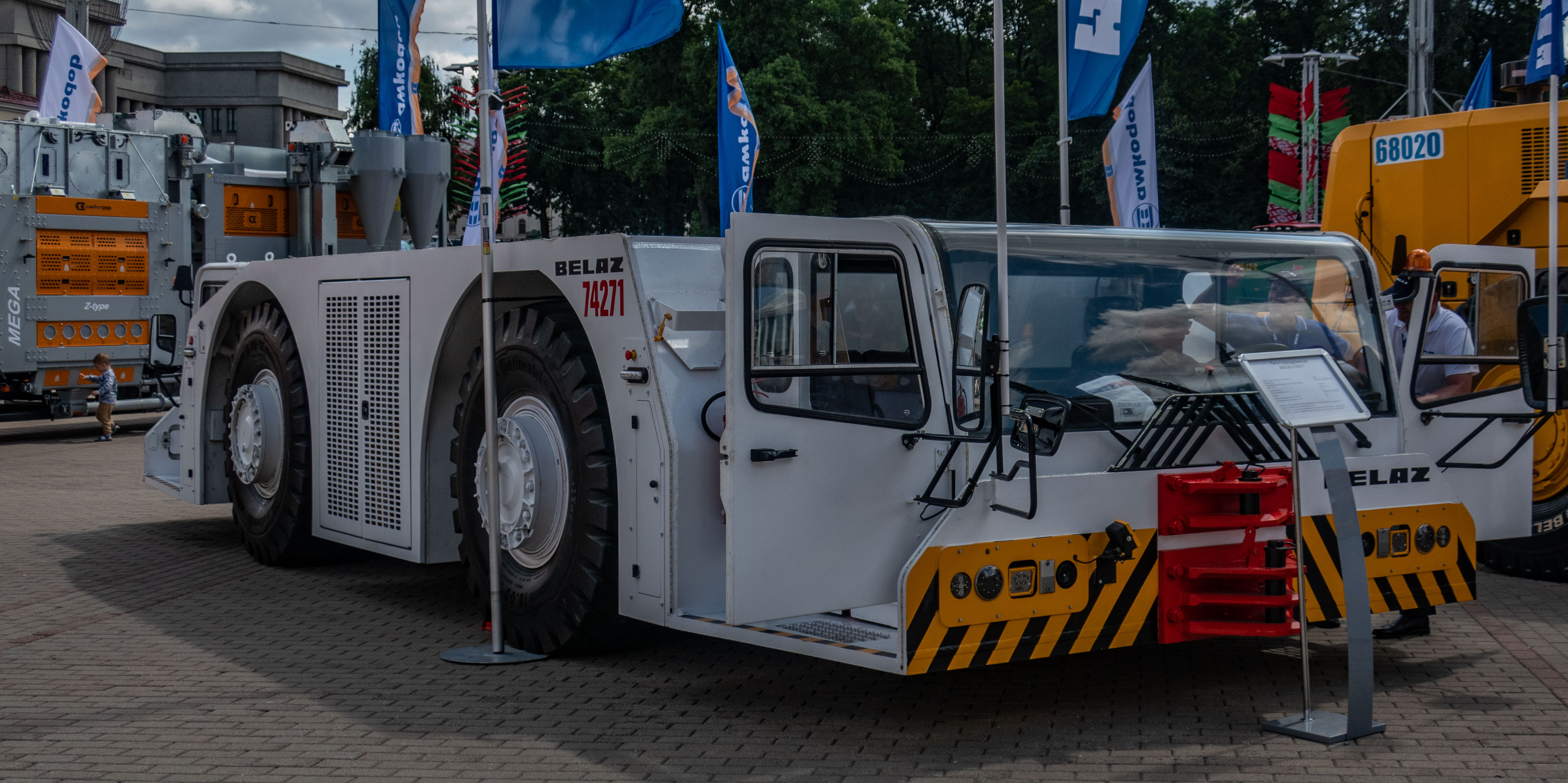
BelAZ 74271 airport tug with double cab

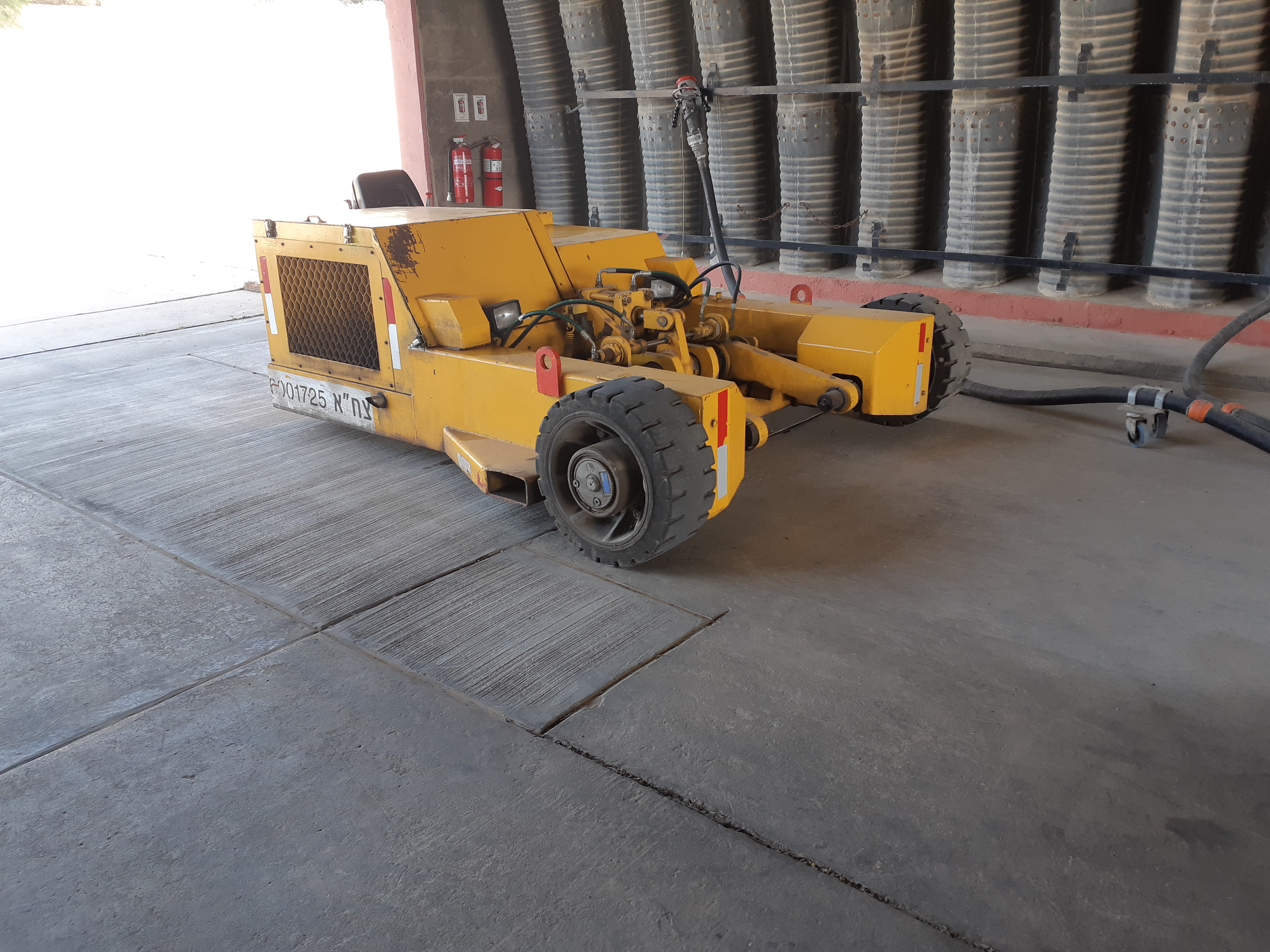
Towbarless tug (NadHaf) for fighter aircraft in Israeli Air Force

MD-88 seen from the cabin of a pushback vehicle

== See also ==
- Aircraft ground handling
- Ground support equipment
- Visual Guidance Docking Systems (VGDS)

== Sources ==
- Operations Manual Bucher aircraft tractor Kp20FlApt13
- Schweizerische Militärmuseum Full
