= SXM Airways =

Charter airline

St. Maarten Airways
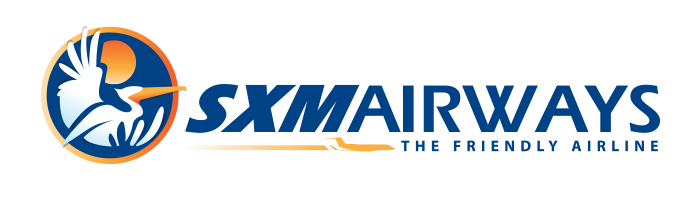
IATA	ICAO	Call sign
—	SXM	Saint Maarten
- Commenced operations: December 12, 2017; 8 years ago
- Operating bases: Princess Juliana International Airport
- Fleet size: 5
- Destinations: 22
- Founders: Rolando Brison

SXM Airways (officially St. Maarten Airways) is a charter airline based at Princess Juliana International Airport on the Dutch Caribbean Island of Sint Maarten. The airline provides on demand chartered flights throughout the Eastern Caribbean.

== History and Founding ==
SXM Airways commenced its operations on December 12, 2017 with a single Britten-Norman BN-2 Islander Aircraft (Registered PJ-SXM). The airline was founded by businessman and politician Rolando Brison with the help of shareholders Elvis Queeley, Michel Carter, Jeff Oliver. All four men previously worked for Windward Islands Airways (Winair).

In April 2012, Brison was fired from his position Winair for alleged embezzlement. In 2015, Winair abruptly dismissed Queeley, Carter, and Oliver after they were caught exploiting Winair’s intellectual property in an attempt to help Brison found his own airline (what would become SXM Airways). The three men all held high-ranking positions at Winair at the time of their terminations. Brison had promised to compensate Queeley, Carter, and Oliver with SXM Airways’ shares, rather than direct compensation. Despite the lawsuits that followed, Sint Maarten’s Court of First Instance ultimately did not impose penalty on any of the men, and SXM Airways was established after a license to operate was successfully obtained.

While SXM Airways was founded with the intention of flying many of the same routes as Winair, they focus exclusively on charter operations that supplement the growing demand for flights in the Eastern Caribbean during tourism seasons.

=== Collaborations ===
In 2024, SXM Airways collaborated with aviation influencer and photographer Sam Chui to promote their charter services to Saint Barthélemy and Saba. These two airports have challenging approaches and landings that Chui showcased on his Youtube channel.

== Destinations ==
SXM airways operates chartered flights primarily to islands neighboring Sint Maarten, like Saint Barthelemy and Saba. SXM Airways is one of only three airlines certified to land at Saba’s Juancho E. Yrausquin Airport.

SXM Airways also provides flights to 20 other destinations throughout the Caribbean and Central America. Both private and business charters are offered.

== Fleet ==
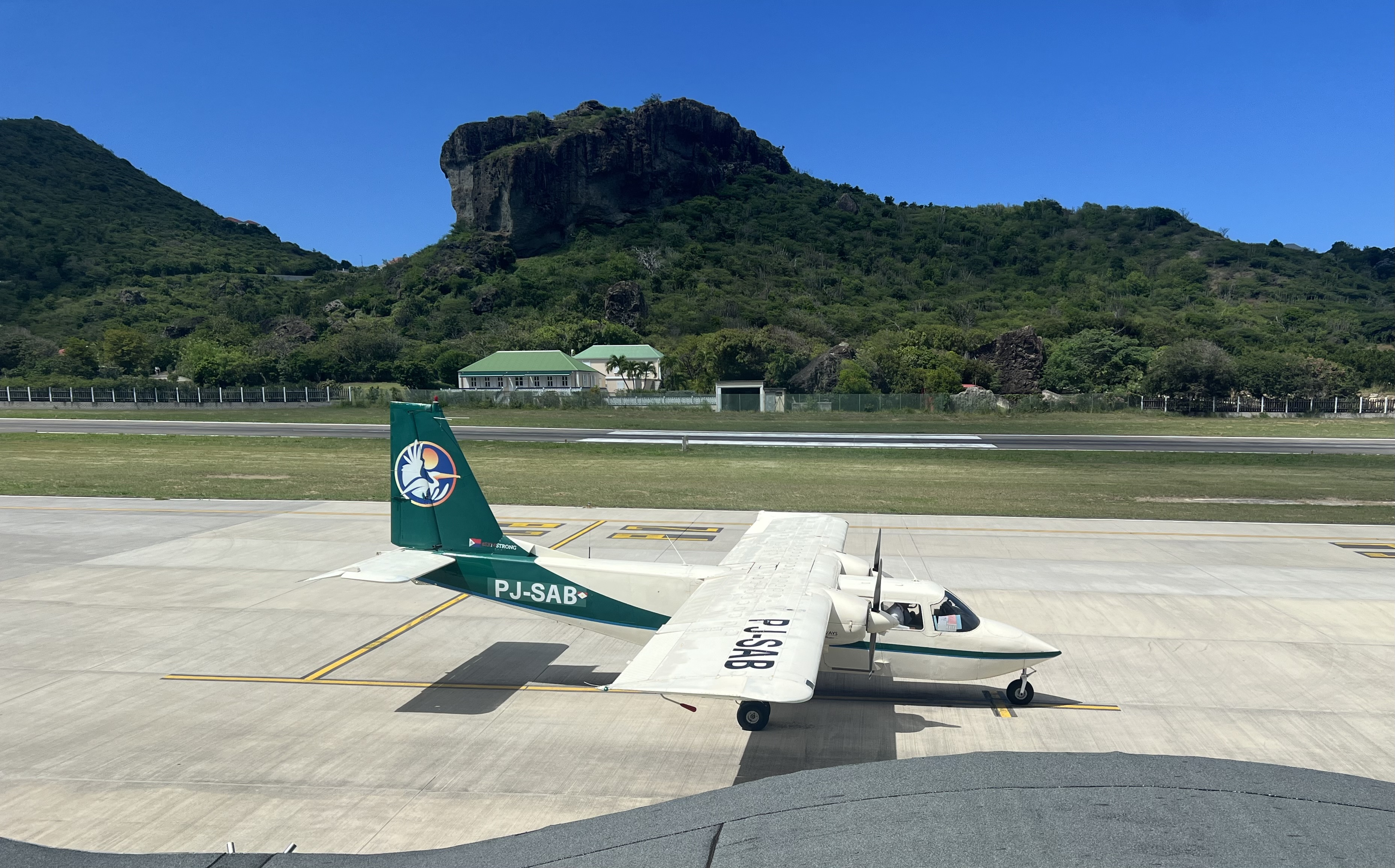
A Britten-Norman BN-2A Islander of SXM Airways seen here at the gates of Gustaf III Airport on St. Barth. Registration: PJ-SAB.

As of April 2025, SXM Airways operates a fleet of five aircraft:

Aircraft type	No. of passengers	Notes
4 Britten-Norman BN-2 Islanders	9	
1 Beechcraft King Air 200	7	Not in frequent use

== See also ==
List of airlines of the Netherlands Antilles
