= Golden Rock Airport =

Golden Rock Airport may refer to

- F.D. Roosevelt Airport, Sint Eustatius
- Robert L. Bradshaw International Airport, Saint Kitts and Nevis
