= Le Grand Marché =

Supermarket chain

LE GRAND MARCHE
- Type: Private company
- Industry: Retail (Grocery)
- Founded: Le Grand Marché, St. Maarten (2002)
- Headquarters: Sint Maarten
- Key people: Anil Sabnani, Managing Director; Deepak Ramchandani, Managing Director
- Products: Bakery, dairy, deli, frozen foods, general grocery, meat, produce, seafood, snacks, liquor
- Number of employees: 200
- Website: www.legrandmarche.net

Le Grand Marché is a supermarket chain based in Sint Maarten in the Caribbean. It began operations in 2002.

Le Grand Marche is operating on 4 locations. It employs around 200 people at its 4 stores.

== History ==
The first Le Grand Marché supermarket in Philipsburg, St.Maarten

The first supermarket was opened at Bush Road on 18 November 2002. The second supermarket was opened at Simpson Bay on 2 October 2006. The Simpson Bay supermarket is called 'Le Gourmet Marché'. The third supermarket was opened at Colebay on 30 October 2006. The fourth supermarket opened in April 2010 in Porto Cupecoy in the Dutch Lowlands. It is a "Le Gourmet Marche".

The second Le Grand Marché supermarket in Simpson Bay, St.Maarten

The third Le Grand Marché supermarket in Cole Bay, St.Maarten

== Locations ==
- Bush Road, Philipsburg, Sint Maarten
- Cole Bay, Near French Border Sint Maarten
- Simpson Bay, Near Marinas close to Princess Juliana International Airport
- Porto Cupecoy, in www.portocupecoy.com
