= Skyway Enterprises Flight 7101 =

2014 aviation accident

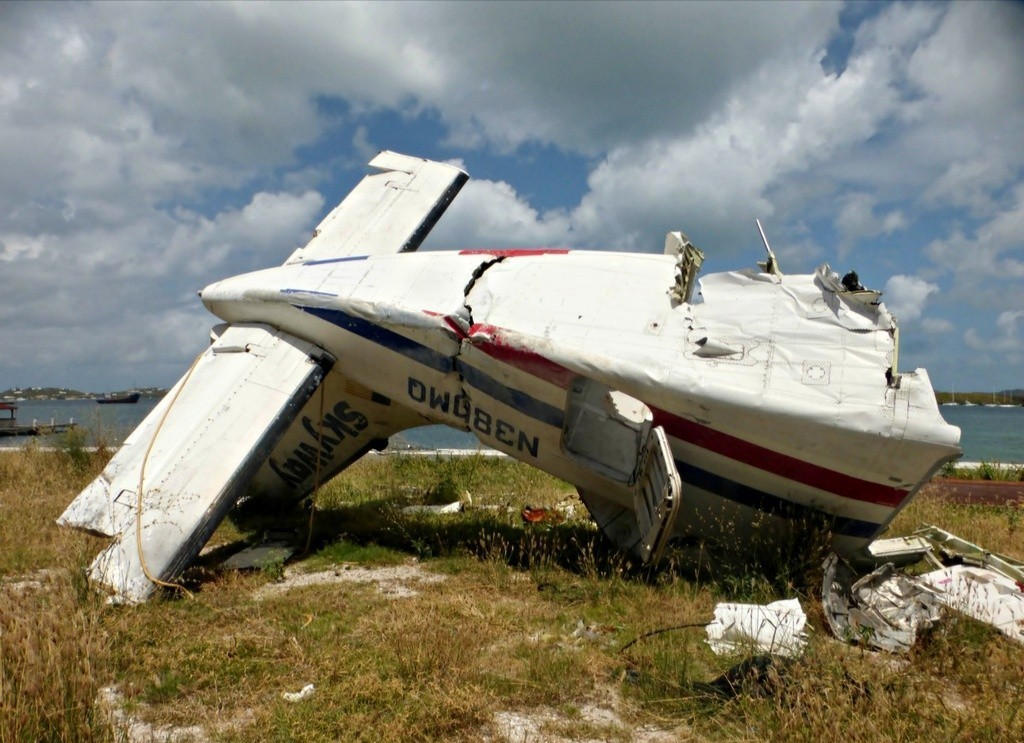
- Wreckage of Flight 7101 as seen in March 2015

Accident
- Date: 29 October 2014
- Summary: Crashed into the sea following loss of control at night
- Site: Approx. 0.8 nm south-west of Maho Beach, Saint Martin; 18.0337°N 63.1297°W

Aircraft
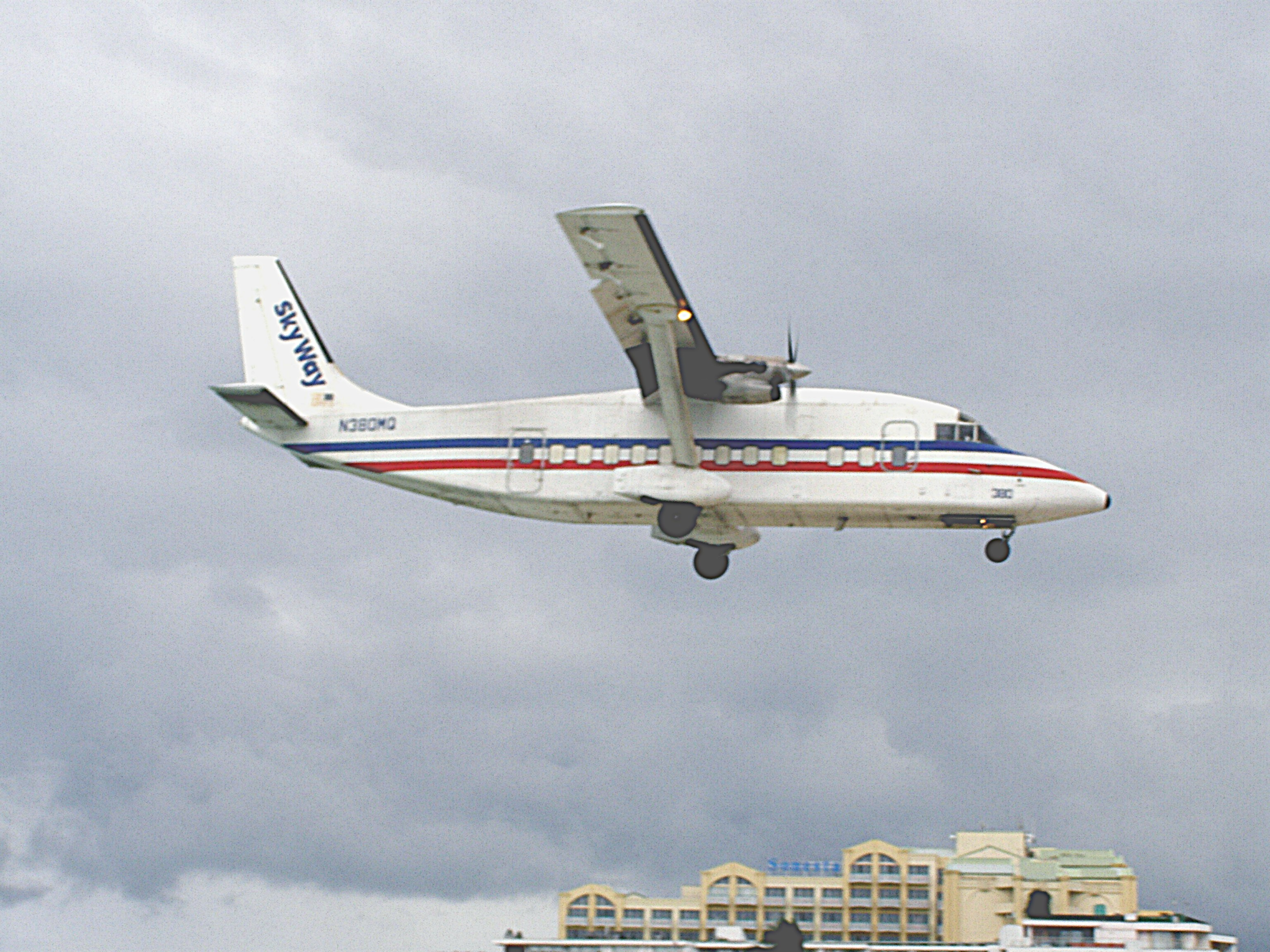
- N380MQ, the aircraft involved, landing at Princess Juliana Airport in 2011
- Aircraft type: Short 360-100
- Operator: Skyway Enterprises
- IATA flight No.: KI7101
- ICAO flight No.: SKZ1701
- Call sign: SKYWAY-INC 7101
- Registration: N380MQ
- Flight origin: Princess Juliana International Airport, Saint Martin
- Destination: Luis Muñoz Marín International Airport, San Juan, Puerto Rico
- Occupants: 2
- Crew: 2
- Fatalities: 2
- Survivors: 0

On October 29, 2014, Skyway Enterprises Flight 7101, a Short 360 cargo aircraft operating a non-scheduled flight from Princess Juliana International Airport on the Caribbean island of Saint Martin to San Juan, Puerto Rico, crashed into the sea shortly after take-off, killing both crew members on board.

The subsequent investigation concluded that somatogravic illusion most likely led to in-flight loss of control and the resulting crash.

== Aircraft and crew ==
The accident aircraft, registration N380MQ , was manufactured by the Short Brothers aerospace company in the United Kingdom in 1986 with manufacturer's serial number SH3702. It was powered by two Pratt & Whitney Canada PT6A-65AR turboprop engines rated at 1,424 shp (1,062 kW) each.

The aircraft was originally ordered as a passenger airliner for Simmons Airlines. It soon after became a part of American Airline's regional carrier American Eagle. It operated for American Eagle until the mid to later part of the 1990s. In the early 2000s, it was purchased by Skyway Enterprises and converted to carry cargo. Up until the crash, the aircraft was still painted in its former American Eagle livery with their logo and titles removed.

The crew consisted of a 49-year-old German national carrying a valid United States green card as captain and a U.S. citizen from Puerto Rico as first officer.

== Accident ==
On the day of the accident, the Short 360-100, operated by Skyway Enterprises on a FedEx charter flight, took off from Princess Juliana's runway 28 at 18:35 local time (22:35Z). During the initial climb-out, approximately 30 seconds after takeoff and at an altitude of about 500 feet (150 m), the air traffic controller gave instructions to change heading to 230°. Shortly afterwards, the aircraft crashed into the sea approximately a mile from Maho Beach. The pilot and co-pilot were killed.

== Recovery ==
At 20:30 local time on the day of the crash, large volumes of debris were reported washing up on shore between Mullet Bay and La Samanna. Rescue efforts were hampered by bad weather, with lightning and heavy rain. At approximately 21:20 the battered body of the pilot Eric Schnell was recovered between Mullet Bay and Cupecoy by the Coast Guard, working with the Royal Marines.

On November 5, 2014 a team of experts arrived from Puerto Rico to assist with recovery of main fuselage from the seabed. A Global Positioning System (GPS) set that was found during the search and rescue operation was sent to the National Transportation Safety Board (NTSB) to assist in narrowing the search area.

On November 10, 2014 the fuselage and a wing were located at a depth of 75 feet by the rescue team in cooperation with the Coast Guard. The missing co-pilot and his seat were not found inside the cabin.

During a search of the wreckage site and surrounding area on November 11, 2014, scuba divers found the body of the co-pilot, still strapped to his seat.

== Investigation ==
The Sint Maarten Civil Aviation Authority issued a recommendation to the Federal Aviation Authority of the United States as a result of this accident, proposing additional regulation of part 135 air carriers. Details investigators examined include:

=== Weather ===
At 19:00 local time, 25 minutes after the crash the weather was reported as "Wind 210 degrees at 8 knots, varying in direction between 160 and 250 degrees; Visibility: 10+ km; light rain; few clouds at 1300 feet; broken clouds at 3500 feet; Temperature: 27°C; Dew point 25°C; Pressure: 1011 mb".

=== Prior incident ===
"The crash follows another incident at SXM Airport just two days prior in which the same aircraft is understood to have been involved. The aircraft is said to have developed a problem during landing and to have veered to the left on the runway, nearly hitting the airport's SOL jet fuel bunker, after which it had to be removed by the Fire Department. The aircraft had undergone repairs during the last two days."

=== Technical problems ===
"Unconfirmed reports stated that the girlfriend of one of the pilots has said that her partner told her he felt uneasy about flying the plane after its recent near miss with technical problems, when it nearly crashed into a SOL fuel tanker on landing two days earlier."

=== Final report ===
The Sint Maarten Civil Aviation Authority released an aircraft accident report on September 23, 2016 stating:

"The investigation believes the PF experienced a loss of control while initiating a turn to the required departure heading after take-off. Flap retraction and its associated acceleration combined to set in motion a somatogravic illusion for the PF. The PF's reaction to pitch down while initiating a turn most likely led to an extreme unusual attitude and the subsequent crash. PM awareness to the imminent loss of control and any attempt to intervene could not be determined. Evidence show that Crew resource management (CRM) performance was insufficient to avoid the crash."

"Contributing factors to the loss of control were environmental conditions including departure from an unfamiliar runway with loss of visual references (black hole), night and rain with gusting winds."
