= Sunset Bar and Grill =

Bar on Maho Beach in Sint Maarten

Coordinates: 18°02′18″N 63°07′13″W

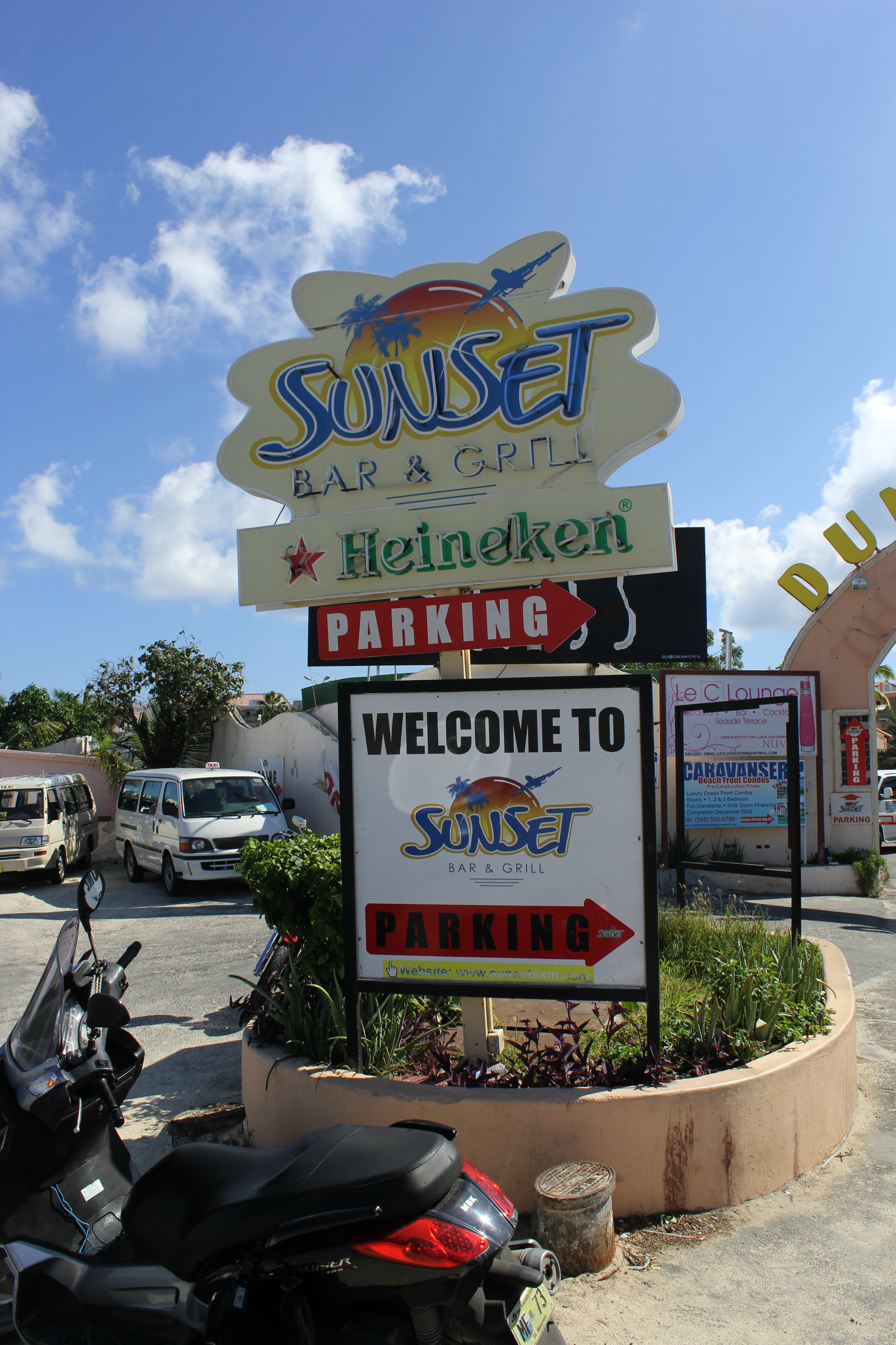
Sunset Bar and Grill

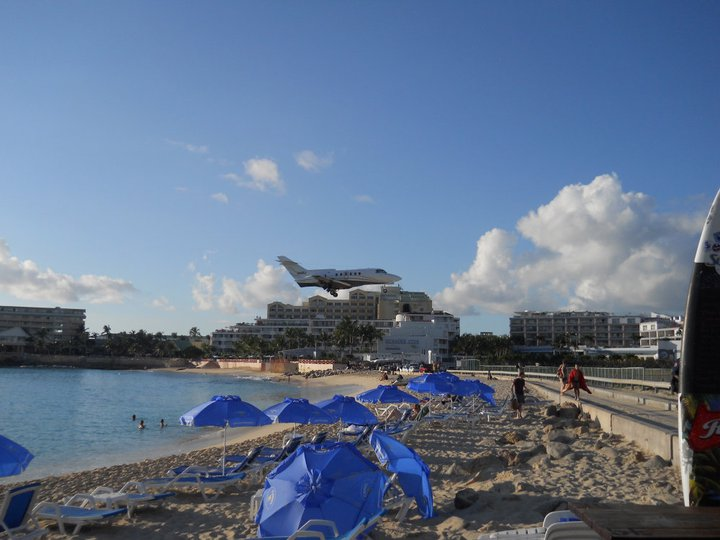
Jet approaching Princess Juliana International Airport, shot from Sunset Bar and Grill

The Sunset Bar and Grill is a small bar located on Maho Beach in Sint Maarten, formerly known as the Sunset Beach Bar. It is best known for its proximity to Princess Juliana International Airport, making it a popular hangout for plane spotters.

== Location ==
Sunset Bar and Grill is located within walking distance of Princess Juliana International, and a short drive from the cruise ship docks on the island. The bar is located just to the south of runway 10 at the airport, on Maho Beach. The bar is also within walking distance of many resorts, including the Royal Islander Club.

== Aircraft spotting ==
The low approach made by heavy jet liners over Maho Beach is part of what has made the bar popular. The bar posts departure and arrival times of all commercial aircraft on TVs in the bar area, and also sells the "Jet Blast", a shot named for the high winds created by departing aircraft, and Pizzas named after different airlines.

== Awards ==
The bar was voted "Best Beach Bar in St. Maarten" in 2011, in a poll conducted by the Daily Herald St. Maarten newspaper.
