= Windward Express =

Dutch Caribbean airline

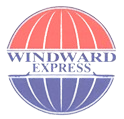

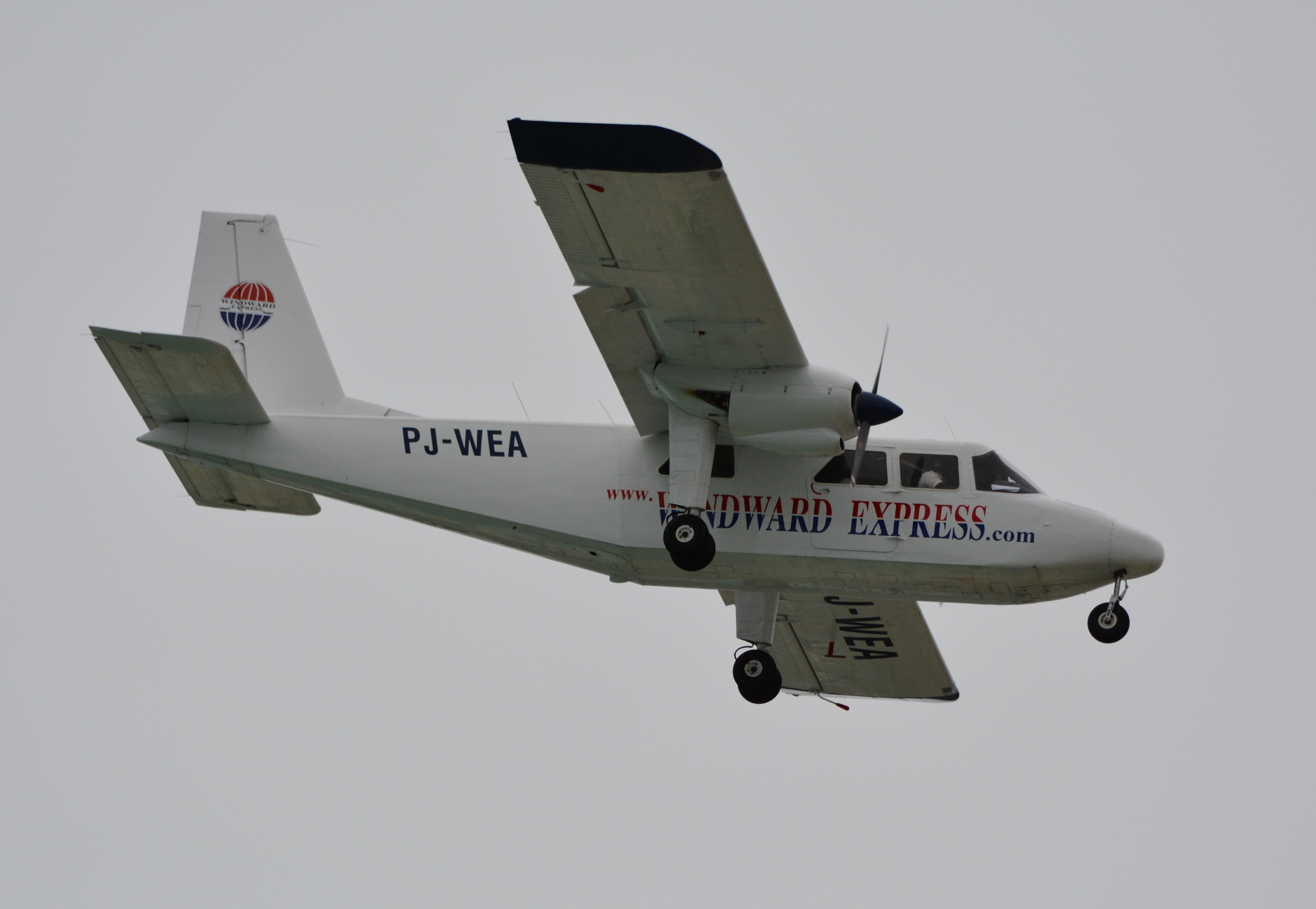
- Windward Express BN2 Islander
IATA	ICAO	Call sign
—	WEA	DAYSTAR
- Founded: 2000; 26 years ago
- Operating bases: Princess Juliana International Airport
- Fleet size: 1
- Destinations: 27
- Headquarters: Philipsburg, Sint Maarten
- Website: www.windwardexpress.com

Windward Express Airways is an airline based at Princess Juliana International Airport in the island of Sint Maarten. It provides air charter and cargo services throughout the Eastern Caribbean.

== Services and fleet ==
Windward Express operates chartered and cargo flights to 27 destinations throughout the Caribbean. The airline flies routes primarily to the Islands of St Barthélemy and Saba from Sint Maarten. It also offers day trips to Anguilla and Sint Eustatius.

As of summer 2024, Windward Express operates a single Britten-Norman BN-2 Islander. Thanks to its STOL (short take-off and landing) capabilities, the type is ideal for operations at airports with short runways in the Caribbean such as Saint-Barthélemy, Baillif, Les Saints, and Saba. Windward Express is one of only three airlines certified to land at Saba's short runway.

=== Former fleet ===
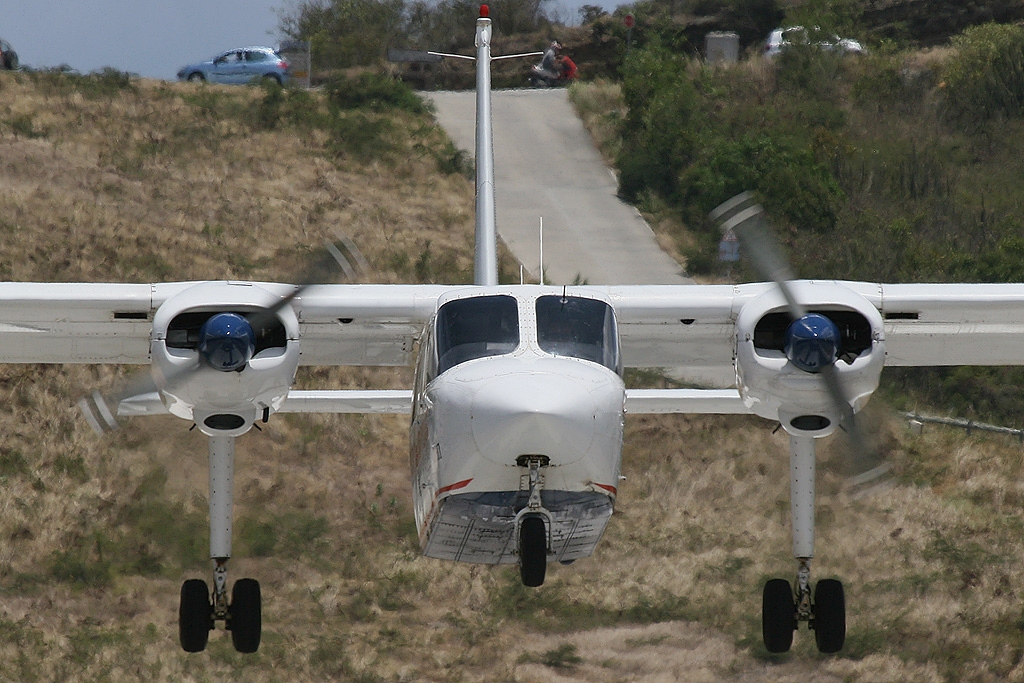
A Windward Express Britten-Norman BN-2 Islander taking off at Gustaf III Airport in 2007

Windward Express's fleet has contracted in recent years. The airline used to operate the following additional aircraft:

Aircraft	No. of passengers	Notes
Britten-Norman BN-2A-26 Islander	9	Destroyed in Hurricane Irma 2017
Britten-Norman BN-2B-20 Islander	9	Under possible rebuild after crash in Feb. 2023.
Piper PA-23 Aztec	4-5	

== Accidents ==
On 13 February 2023, a Windward Express BN-2B-20 Islander (registered PJ-WEB) sustained substantial damage while landing at the Saba-Juancho E. Yrausquin Airport (SAB / TNCS). The aircraft struck the ground to the left and approximately one meter before the threshold of runway 12. With the main landing gear severely bent, the aircraft subsequently made a hard landing on the runway. The pilot, two passengers, and a dog exited the aircraft unharmed.

Weather was ruled as the main factor in the accident. Rain showers were reported in the area at the time of the accident, and a heavy downdraft likely forced the aircraft into the terrain.

== See also ==
- List of airlines of the Netherlands Antilles
