= F. D. Roosevelt Airport =

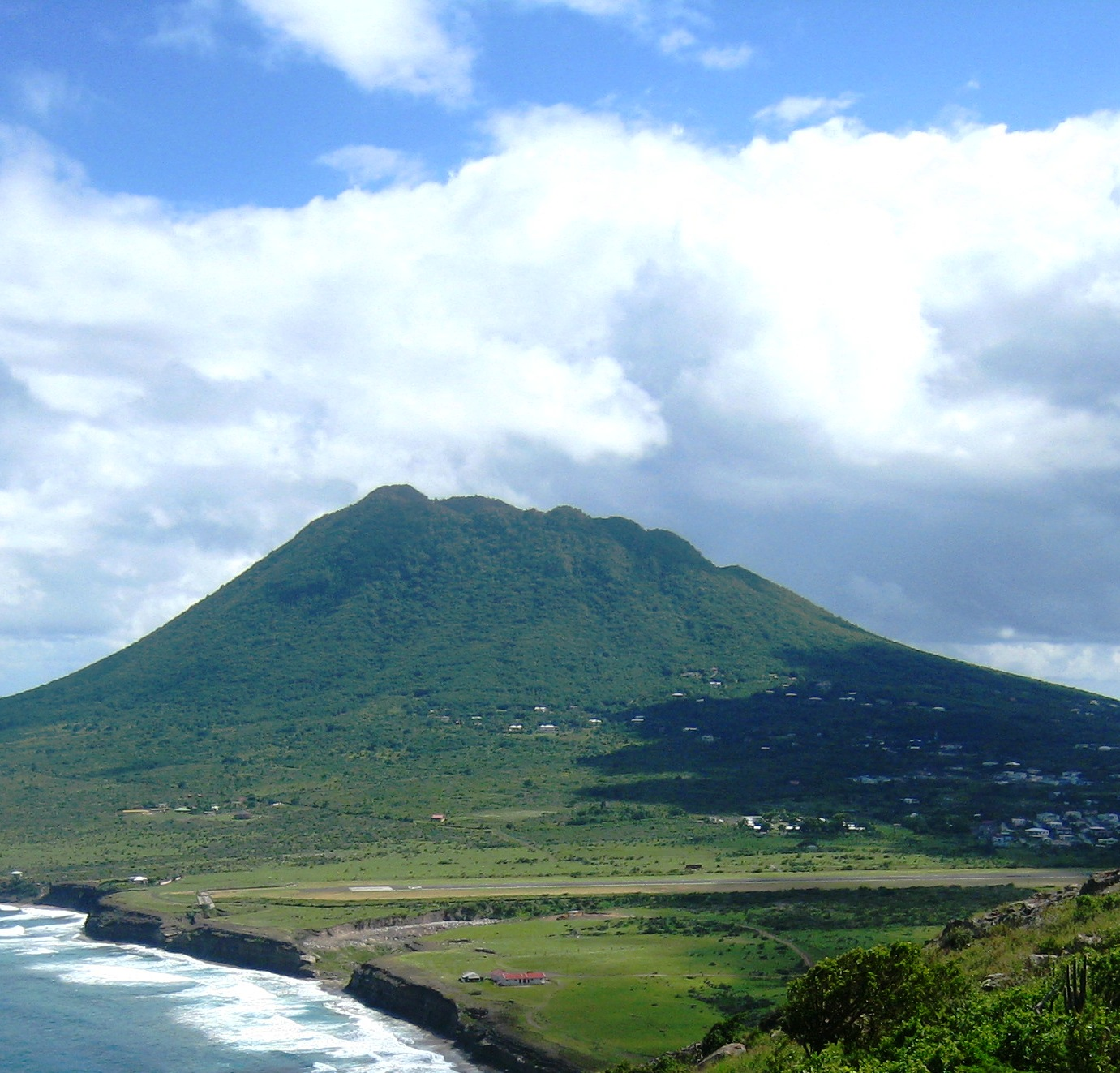
- The airport seen from a distance with The Quill in the background
- IATA: EUX; ICAO: TNCE

Summary
- Airport type: Public
- Owner: Island Government of Sint Eustatius
- Operator: Island Government of Sint Eustatius
- Serves: Oranjestad
- Location: Sint Eustatius
- Elevation AMSL: 129 ft (39 m)
- Coordinates: 17°29′47″N 062°58′46″W

Map
- Location in Sint Eustatius

Runways
Direction	Length		Surface
Direction	m	ft	Surface
06/24	1,300	4,265	Asphalt
- Source: DAFIF

F. D. Roosevelt Airport (IATA: EUX, ICAO: TNCE) is the airport located on the Dutch Caribbean island of Sint Eustatius. It was opened as "Golden Rock Airport" in 1946 and renamed for Franklin Delano Roosevelt. As of 2012, the only commercial aircraft that served the island was the DHC-6 Twin Otter (can operate chartered flights with Britten-Norman Islander and Cessna 208 Caravan), although the runway can accommodate larger turboprop aircraft and some smaller jets. As of 2023, the largest aircraft type to operate at the airport is the ATR 42.

President Roosevelt had Dutch ancestors and in 1939 presented Sint Eustatius with a plaque in recognition of the "First Salute," the first official salute of the flag of the newly declared independent United States in 1776. Members of the Roosevelt family lived on St. Eustatius in the 18th century and had possessions on the island.

== Facilities ==
The airport is built to support small aircraft. A small single story terminal building processes passengers and baggage and also serves as the customs area. A two-story tower is attached, but the airport has no control tower. There are no jetways or services, and a small apron allows for aircraft passengers to disembark.

== Future development ==
The island is not a traditional Caribbean tourist destination, and so it does not have overcrowded beaches and blueprint resorts. The local government has, however, sought to increase tourism by attracting visitors to visit its dive sites, hike its dormant volcano The Quill and explore the remains of its colonial history and the restored historical city of Oranjestad. Part of this plan is a proposed 1,000-foot (300 m) extension of the runway, in order to accommodate even larger aircraft and additional destinations.

== Airlines and destinations ==
Airlines	Destinations
Trans Anguilla Airways	Anguilla
Winair	Sint Maarten

== Access ==
Access to the airport is by private vehicle or taxi service from the surrounding areas of the island. Main access to the airport is via Max T. Pandt Boulevard.
