= Aircraft spotting =

Observation hobby

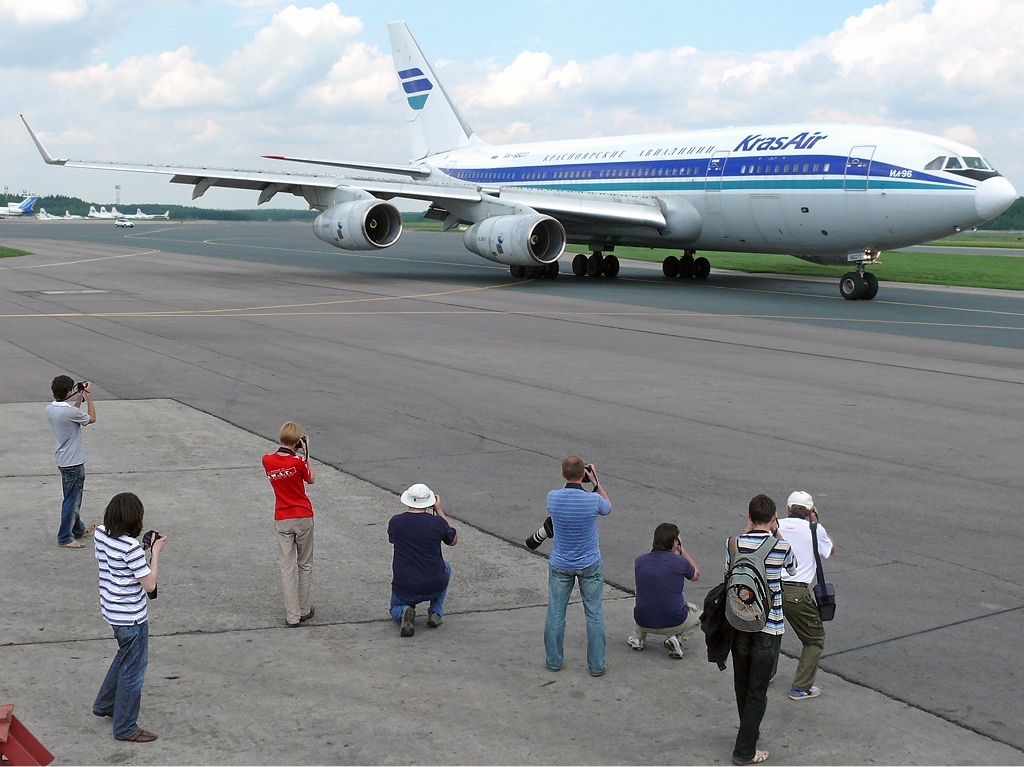
A group of planespotters at Domodedovo International Airport taking photos of a KrasAir Ilyushin Il-96-300 in June 2008.

Aircraft spotting or planespotting is a hobby consisting of observing and tracking civil or military aircraft, often accompanied with photography or videography. Besides monitoring aircraft, planespotters also frequently monitor or record information regarding airports, air traffic control communications, airline routes, and associated aviation information.

== History and evolution ==
Aviation enthusiasts have been watching airplanes and other aircraft since aviation began. However, as a hobby (distinct from active/wartime work), planespotting did not appear until the second half of the 20th century.

During World War II and the subsequent Cold War, some countries encouraged their citizens to become "planespotters" in an "observation corps" or similar public body for reasons of public security. Britain had the Royal Observer Corps which operated between 1925 and 1995. A journal called The Aeroplane Spotter was published in January 1940. The publication included a glossary that was refined in 2010 and published online.

The development of technology and global resources enabled a revolution in planespotting. Point and shoot cameras, DSLRs and walkie talkies have significantly changed the hobby. With the help of the internet, websites such as FlightAware and Flightradar24 have made it possible for planespotters to easily locate and track the movement of specific aircraft around the world. Websites such as airliners.net, JetPhotos, Instagram and YouTube allow spotters to upload their photos or videos of their sightings and share them with viewers worldwide.

== Techniques ==
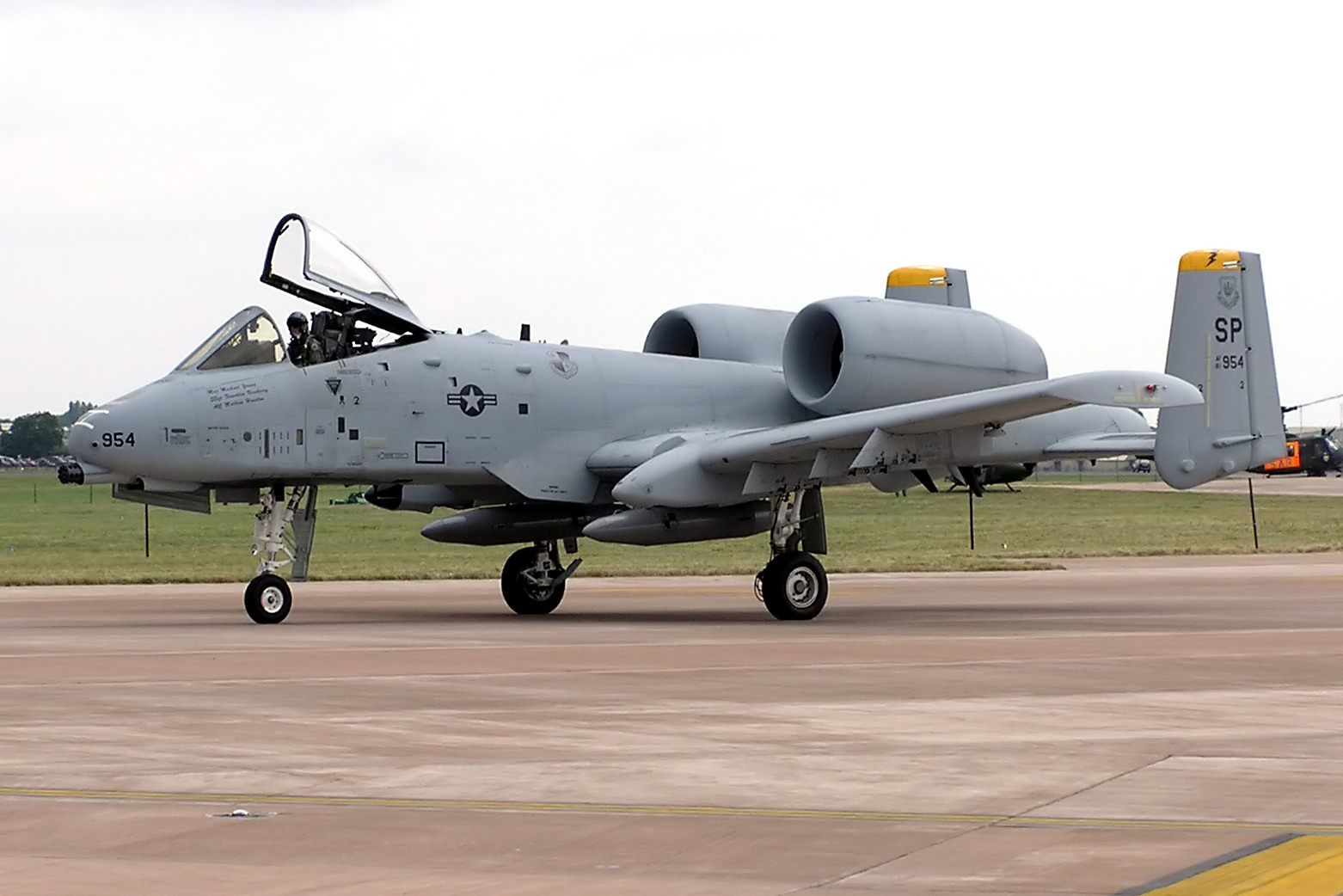
The high engine position on this USAF A-10 Thunderbolt II is an easily observed distinguishing feature of this aircraft.

When spotting aircraft, observers generally notice the key attributes of an aircraft, such as a distinctive noise from its engine, the number of contrails it is producing, or its callsign. Observers can also assess the size of the aircraft and the number, type, and position of its engines. Another distinctive attribute is the position of wings relative to the fuselage and the degree to which they are swept rearwards. The wings may be above the fuselage, below it, or fixed at midpoint. The number of wings indicates whether it is a monoplane, biplane or triplane. The position of the tailplane relative to the fin(s) and the shape of the fin are other attributes. The configuration of the landing gear can be distinctive, as well as the size and shape of the cockpit and passenger windows along with the layout of emergency exits and doors.

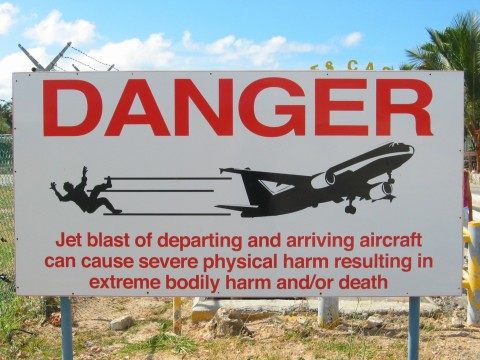
Warning sign at Maho Beach for approaching and departing aircraft at Princess Juliana International Airport. Numerous observers have been injured or even killed after being blown into solid objects by jet blast.

Other features include the speed, cockpit placement, colour scheme or special equipment that changes the silhouette of the aircraft. Taken together these traits will enable the identification of an aircraft. If the observer is familiar with the airfield being used by the aircraft and its normal traffic patterns, they are more likely to leap quickly to a decision about the aircraft's identity – they may have seen the same type of aircraft from the same angle many times. This is particularly prevalent if the aircraft spotter is spotting commercial aircraft, operated by airlines that have a limited fleet.

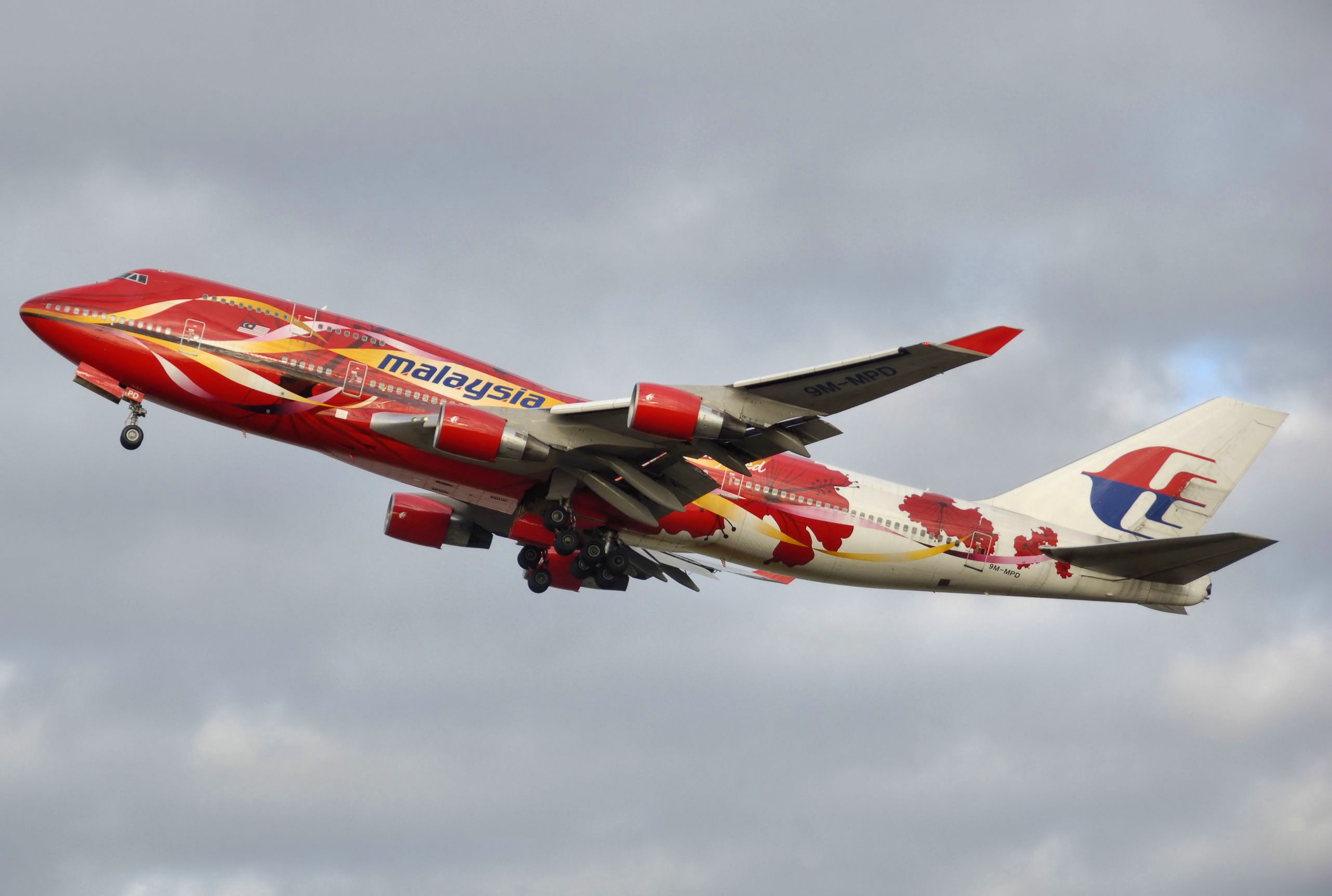
Spotters and photographers enjoy seeing aircraft in special colour schemes, like this Malaysia Airlines Boeing 747-400.

Spotters use equipment such as ADS-B decoders to track the movements of aircraft. The two most famous devices used are the AirNav Systems RadarBox and Kinetic Avionics SBS series. Both of them read and process the radar data and show the movements on a computer screen. Another tool that spotters can use are apps such as FlightRadar24 or Flightaware, where they can look at arrival and departure schedules and track the location of aircraft that have their transponder on. Most of the decoders also allow the exporting of logs from a certain route or airport.

== Spotting ==
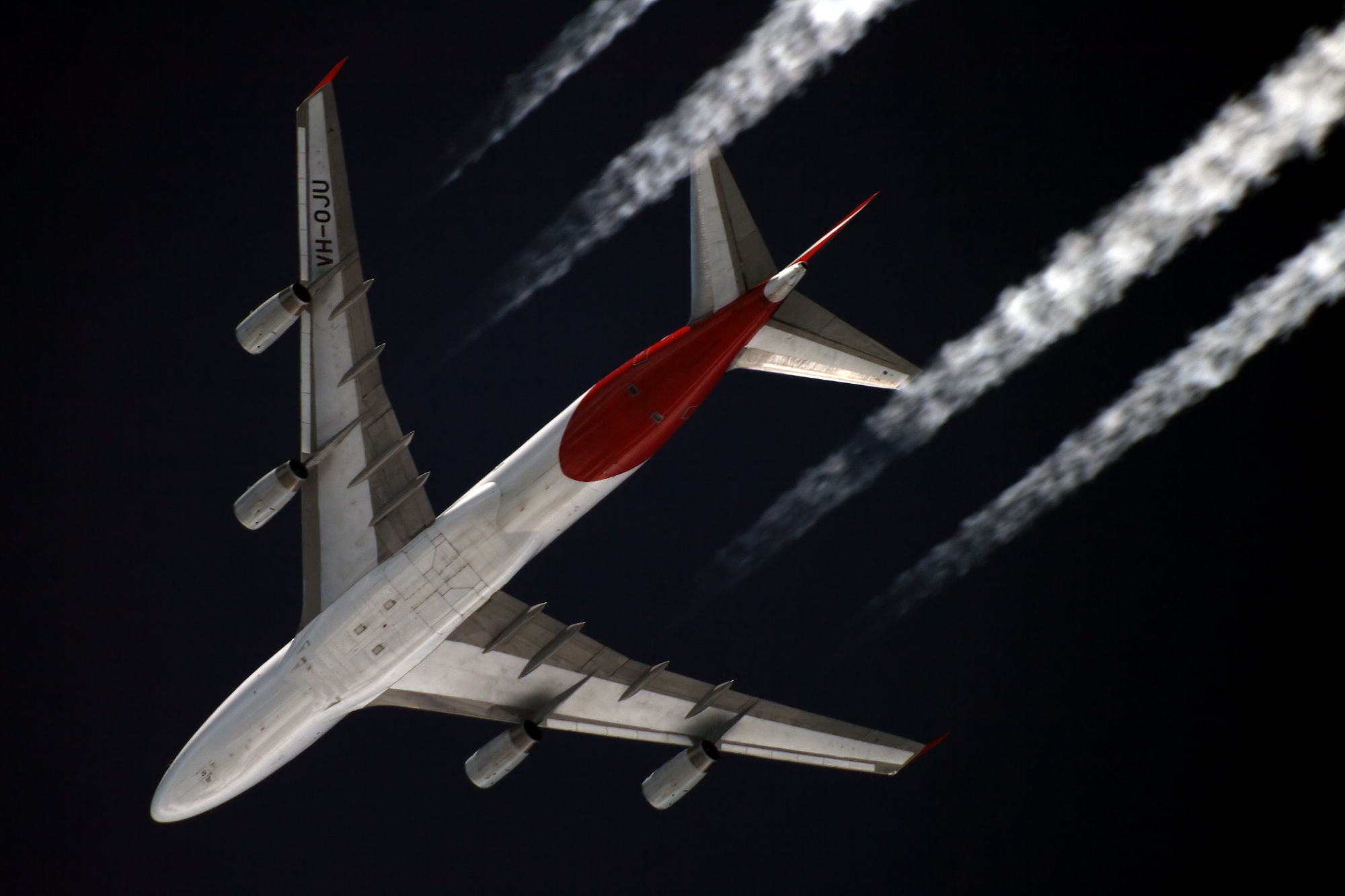
A Qantas Boeing 747-400 in May 2010 flying over Starbeyevo, Moscow at an altitude of about 36,089 feet (11,000 m). The photographer used a 1,200 mm (47 in) telescope and 2x Barlow lens in order to take this photo from the ground.

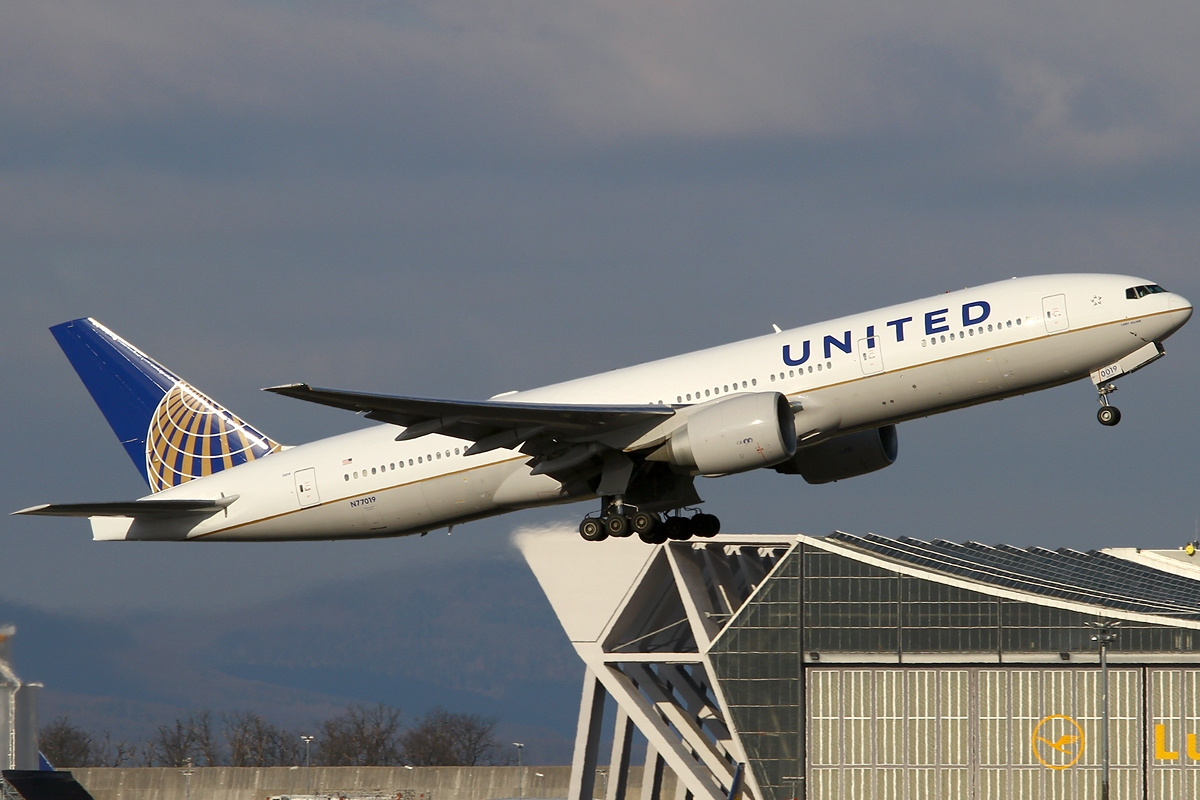
A United Airlines Boeing 777-200ER taking off from Frankfurt Airport in January 2011.

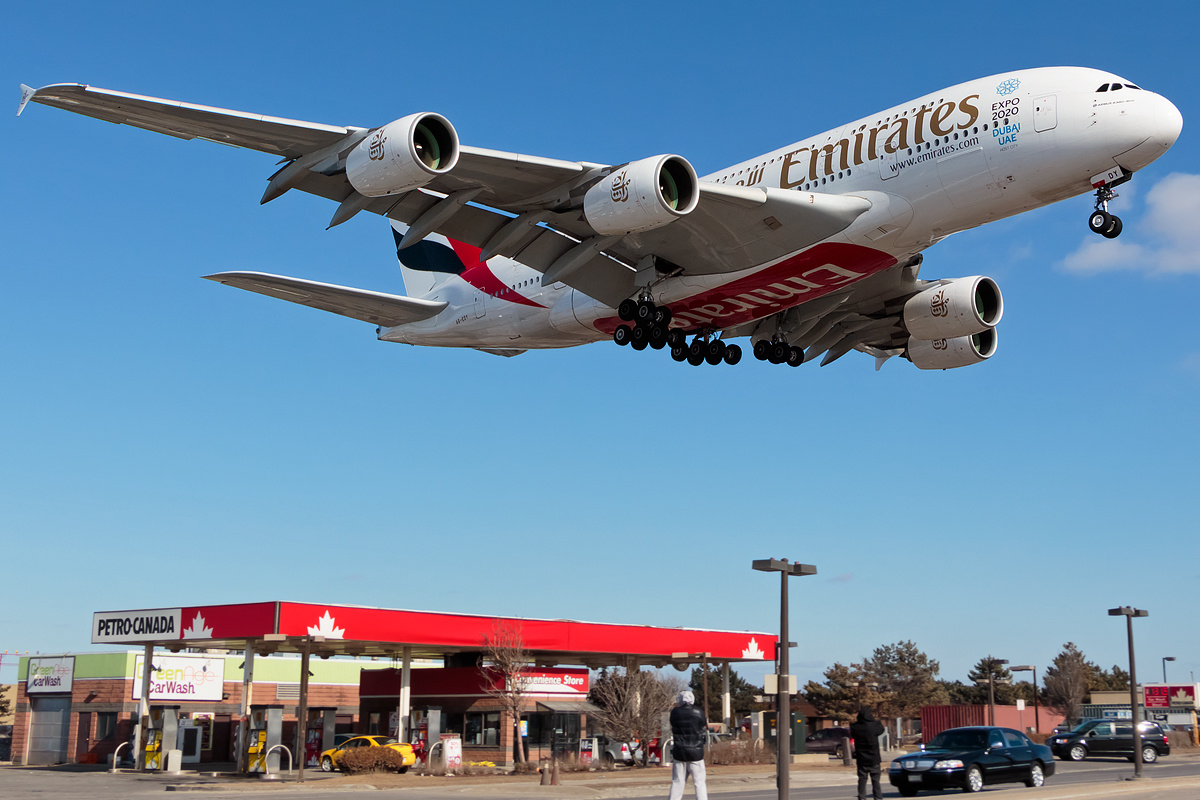
Spotters photographing an Emirates Airbus A380 on descent to Toronto Pearson International Airport in March 2014.

Some spotters will note and compile the markings, a national insignia or airline livery or logo, a squadron badge or code letters in the case of a military aircraft. Published manuals allow more information to be deduced, such as the delivery date or the manufacturer's construction number. Camouflage markings differ, depending on the surroundings in which that aircraft is expected to operate.

In general, most spotters attempt to see as many aircraft of a given type, a particular airline, or a particular subset of aircraft such as business jets, commercial airliners, military and/or general aviation aircraft. Some spotters attempt to see every airframe and are known as "frame spotters." Others are keen to see every registration worn by each aircraft.

Ancillary activities might include listening-in to air traffic control transmissions (using radio scanners, where that is legal), liaising with other "spotters" to clear up uncertainties as to what aircraft have been seen at specific times or in particular places. Several internet mailing list groups have been formed to help communicate aircraft seen at airports, queries and anomalies. These groups can cater to certain regions, certain aircraft types, or may appeal to a wider audience. The result is that information on aircraft movements can be delivered worldwide in a real-time fashion to spotters.

The hobbyist might travel long distances to visit different airports, to see an unusual aircraft, or to view the remains of aircraft withdrawn from use. Air shows usually draw large numbers of spotters as they are opportunities to enter airfields and air bases worldwide that are usually closed to the public and to see displayed aircraft at close range. Some aircraft may be placed in the care of museums (see Aviation archaeology) – or perhaps be cannibalized in order to repair a similar aircraft already preserved.

Aircraft registrations can be found in books, with online resources, or in monthly magazines from enthusiast groups. Most spotters maintained books of different aircraft fleets and would underline or check each aircraft seen. Each year, a revised version of the books would be published and the spotter would need to re-underline every aircraft seen. With the development of commercial aircraft databases spotters were finally able to record their sightings in an electronic database and produce reports that emulated the underlined books.

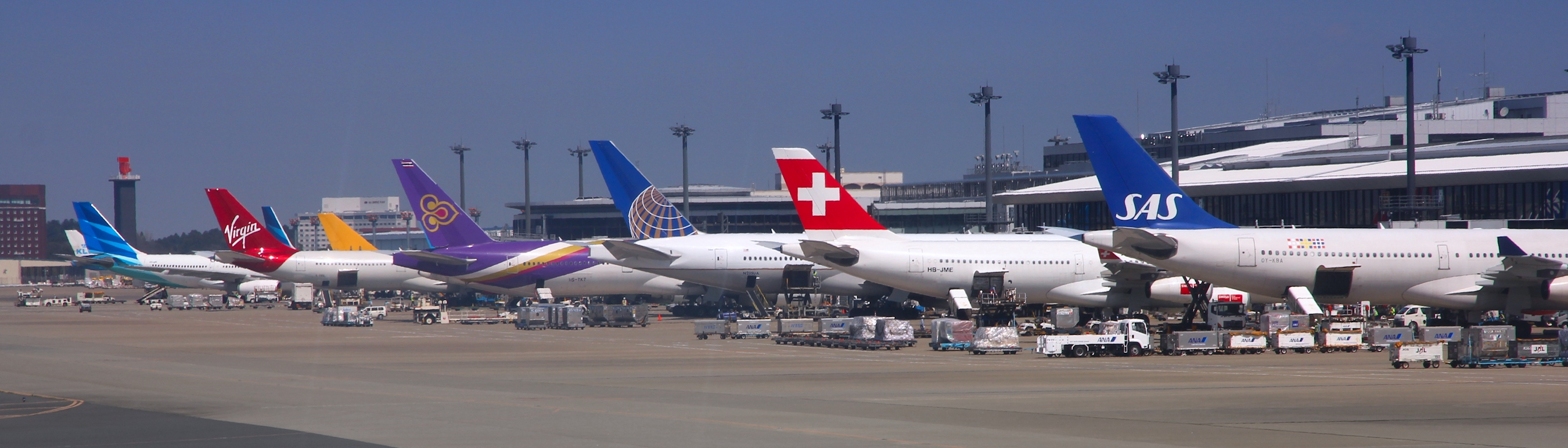
Major international airports like Tokyo Narita are an opportunity for planespotters to spot a variety of airlines and aircraft models

Because of the Internet and live video streaming, planespotters are now able to watch departure and arrival traffic from anywhere in the world with Internet access. Airline Videos Live, based in Los Angeles at LAX and streaming since 2019. In addition to LAX, AVL also streams from airports such as San Francisco (SFO), New York (JFK), Phoenix (PHX) and even Sint Maarten.

== Legal ramifications ==
The legal repercussions of the hobby were dramatically shown in November 2001 when fourteen aircraft spotters (twelve British, two Dutch) were arrested by Greek police after being observed at an open day at the Greek Air Force base at Kalamata. They were charged with espionage and faced a possible 20-year prison sentence if found guilty. After being held for six weeks, they were eventually released on $11,696 (£9,000) bail, and the charges reduced to the misdemeanor charge of illegal information collection. They returned for their trial in April 2002 and were found guilty, with eight of the group sentenced to three years, the rest for one year. At their appeal a year later, all were acquitted.

== As airport watch groups ==
In the wake of the targeting of airports by terrorists, enthusiasts' organisations and police in the UK have cooperated in creating a code of conduct for planespotters, in a similar vein to guidelines devised for train spotters. By asking enthusiasts to contact police if spotters believe they see or hear something suspicious, this is an attempt to allow enthusiasts to continue their hobby while increasing security around airports. Birmingham and Stansted pioneered this approach in Britain and prior to the 2012 London Olympics, RAF Northolt introduced a Flightwatch scheme based on the same cooperative principles. These changes are also being made abroad in countries such as Australia, where aviation enthusiasts are reporting suspicious or malicious actions to police.

The organisation of such groups has now been echoed in parts of North America. For example, the Bensenville, Illinois police department have sponsored an Airport Watch group at the Chicago O'Hare Airport. Members are issued identification cards and given training to accurately record and report unusual activities around the airport perimeter. (Members are not permitted airside.) Meetings are attended and supported by the FBI, Chicago Department of Aviation and the TSA who also provide regular training to group members. The Bensenville program was modeled on similar programs in Toronto, Ottawa and Minneapolis.

In 2009, a similar airport watch group was organized between airport security and local aircraft spotters at Montréal–Pierre Elliott Trudeau International Airport. As of 2016, the group has 46 members and a special phone number to use to contact police if suspicious activity is seen around the airport area.

== Extraordinary rendition ==
Following the events of 9/11, information collected by planespotters helped uncover what is known as extraordinary rendition by the CIA. Information on unusual movements of rendition aircraft provided data that was mapped by critical geographers such as Trevor Paglen and the Institute for Applied Autonomy. These data and maps led first to news reports and then to a number of governmental and inter-governmental investigations.

== See also ==
- Bus spotting
- Car spotting
- Train spotting
- Satellite watching
- Ship watching
