= Gustaf III Airport =

Rémy de Haenen Airport Gustaf III Airport Saint Barthélemy Airport St. Jean Airport Aérodrome de St Jean
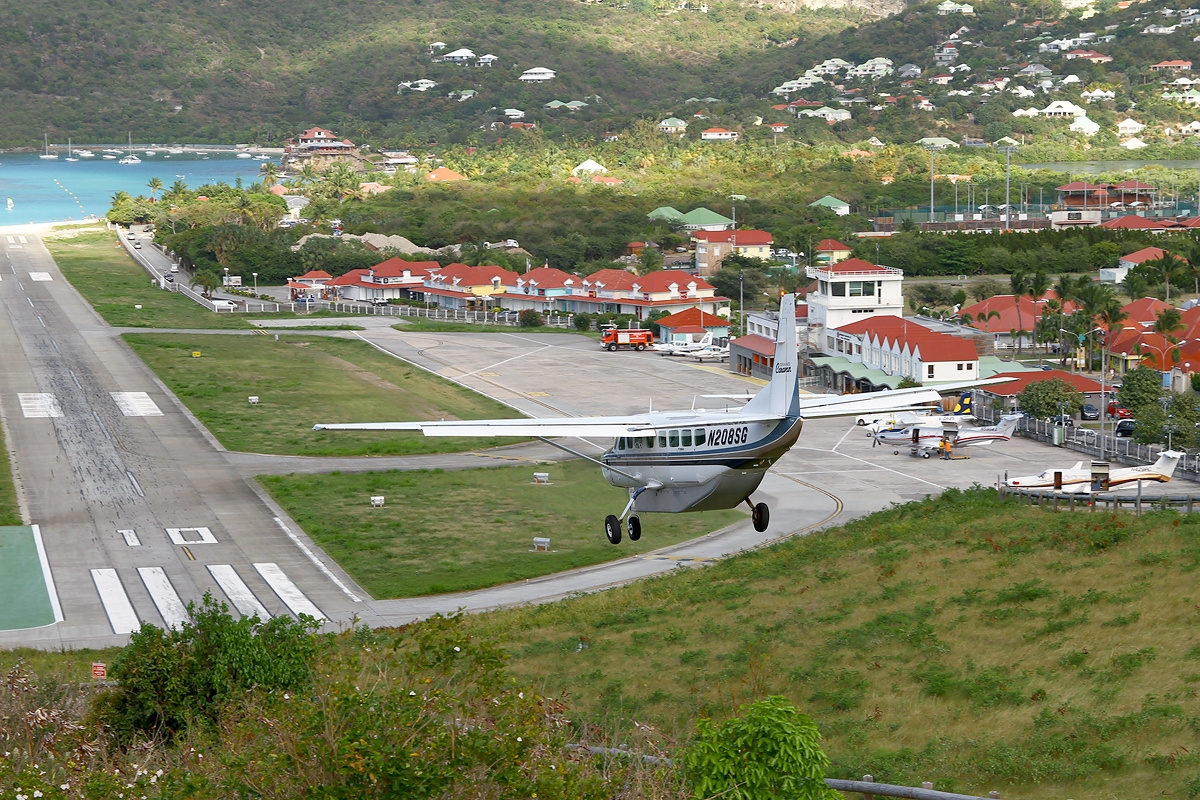
- IATA: SBH; ICAO: TFFJ

Summary
- Airport type: Public
- Operator: Mairie de St Barthélemy
- Serves: Saint Barthélemy
- Location: St. Jean
- Hub for: Tradewind Aviation
- Elevation AMSL: 48 ft (15 m)
- Coordinates: 17°54′16″N 062°50′38″W

Map
- Location of airport in Saint Barthélemy

Runways
Direction	Length		Surface
Direction	m	ft	Surface
10/28	646	2,119	Concrete

Statistics (2023)
- Passengers: 203,841
- Passenger traffic change: ▼6.9%
- Aircraft movements: 41,271
- Aircraft movements change: ▼7.3%
- Source: French AIP, Aeroport.fr

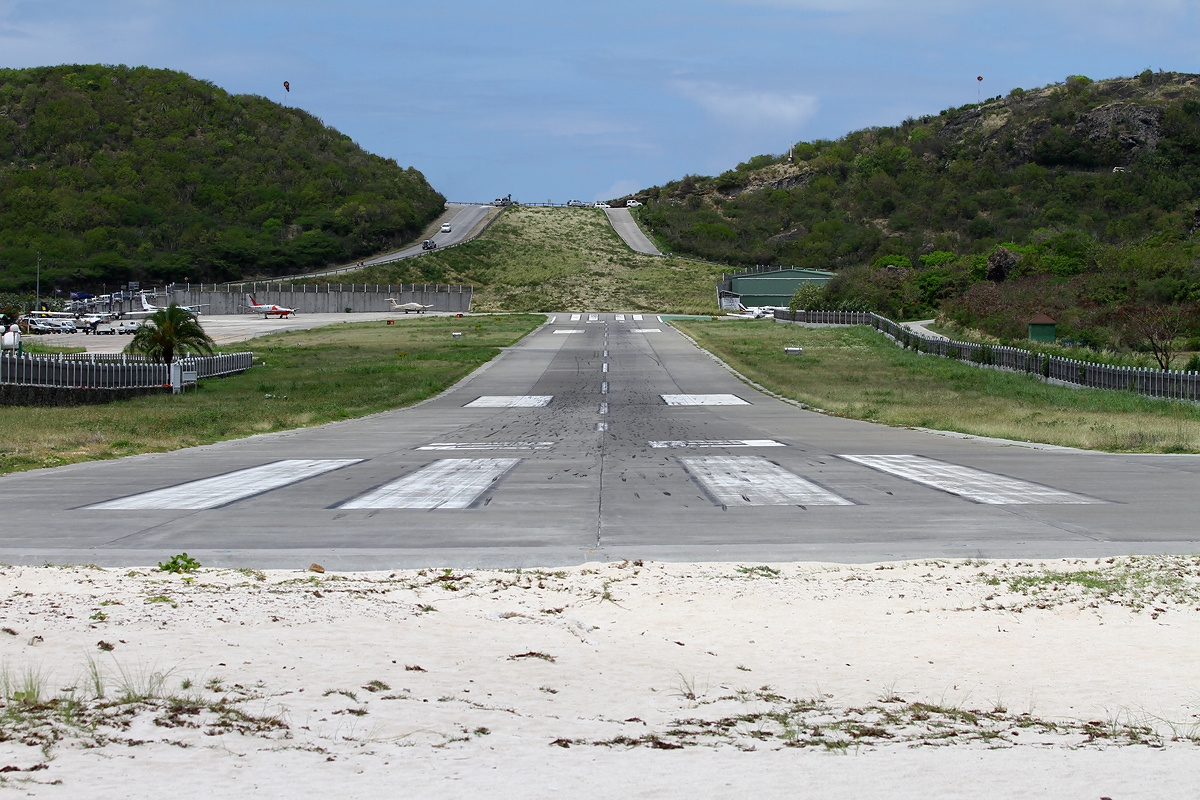
A view of the runway from Saint Jean Beach.

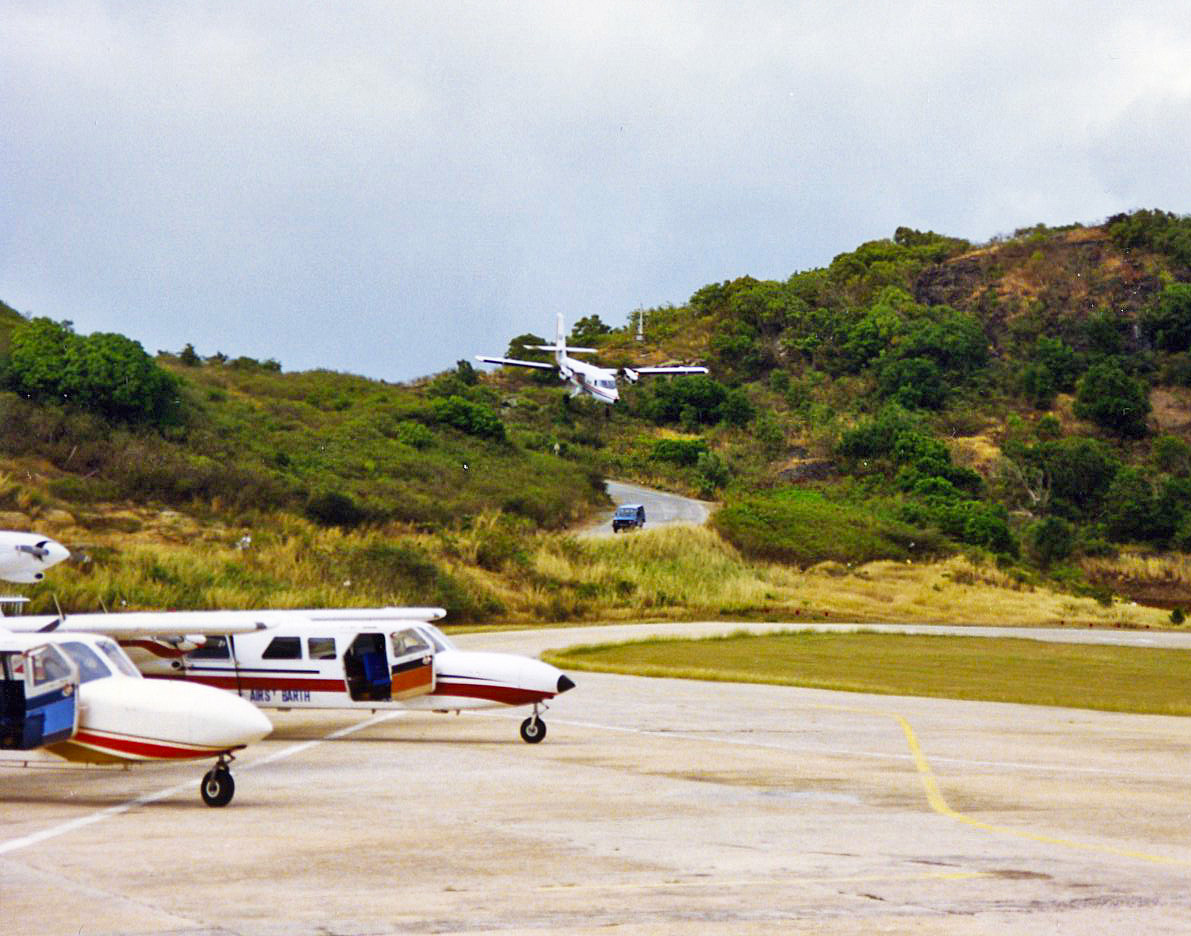
A Winair Twin Otter coming in to land at Gustaf III Airport via the challenging hill approach to runway 10 in the 1990s. This image was taken before the hill was lowered and the road was moved. Today the road has been shifted farther left and does not run so directly under the approach paths of aircraft.

Gustaf III Airport (IATA: SBH, ICAO: TFFJ), also known as Saint Barthélemy Airport, Rémy de Haenen Airport, sometimes as St. Jean Airport (French: Aérodrome de St Jean), is a public use airport located in the village of St. Jean on the Caribbean island of Saint Barthélemy.

Due to its very short runway, very close proximity to automotive traffic on a nearby road, and the necessity of a license to land at the airport, The History Channel documentary Most Extreme Airports ranked it the third most dangerous airport in the world, behind Toncontín International Airport and Lukla Airport. In spite of sensational videos and intense media coverage, the airport is regarded by experts as extremely safe, though it requires specialty certification for permission to land as a result of its unique features.

== Overview ==
The airport is served by small regional commercial aircraft and charters. Most visiting aircraft carry fewer than twenty passengers, such as the Canadian-built De Havilland DHC-6 Twin Otter, a common sight throughout the northern West Indies and as a curiosity, the De Havilland DHC-7 is the largest aircraft ever allowed to operate at the airport. Additionally, a lightly loaded Douglas DC-3 once managed to land at the airport, making it possibly the largest confirmed aircraft to land at St Barth. The most common aircraft flying in for commercial service today are the Pilatus PC-12, Cessna 208B Grand Caravan, de Havilland DHC-6 Twin Otter, and Britten-Norman BN-2 Islander.

The short airstrip is at the base of a gentle slope ending directly on the beach. The arrival descent into runway 10 is extremely steep over the hilltop traffic circle; departing planes fly right over the heads of sunbathers (although small signs advise sunbathers not to lie directly at the end of the runway). The airport is located at the island's second-largest town, St. Jean.

== History ==
Both the airport and the island's main town of Gustavia are named after King Gustav III of Sweden, under whom Sweden obtained the island from France in 1784 (it was sold back to France in 1878). In 1984, the Swedish Minister of Communications, Hans Gustafsson, inaugurated the terminal building of the Gustaf III Airport. In 2015 the airport got the name Aéroport de Saint-Barthélemy-Rémy-de-Haenen, named after Rémy de Haenen, an aviation pioneer and later mayor of Saint Barthélemy. De Haenen first landed on the site of what would become the airport in 1946. At the time, the area was used as pasture land for sheep.

Between 2003 and 2005, the hilltop at the end of runway 10 was lowered, and the road running up the hill was moved farther left (if looking up the hill from the airport) into the newly cleared area. This allowed car traffic to pass less directly under the approach path to runway 10. This alteration additionally provided pilots with a clearer view on final approach and came as part of a full renewal of the airport, culminating in its closing for six weeks in late 2004.

== Airlines and destinations ==
=== Passenger ===
Airlines	Destinations
Cape Air	Saint Thomas
St Barth Commuter	Pointe-à-Pitre, Saint Martin, Sint Maarten
St Barth Executive	Pointe-à-Pitre, San Juan, Sint Maarten
Tradewind Aviation	Antigua, San Juan
Winair	Sint Maarten

In addition to these scheduled services, charter airlines like Windward Express and Trans Anguilla Airways provide on demand flights to and from St. Barth.

=== Cargo ===
Airlines	Destinations
DHL Aviation	Anguilla, Antigua, Fort-de-France, Grenada, Nevis, Pointe-à-Pitre, Port of Spain, Saint Croix, Saint Kitts, Saint Thomas, San Juan, Sint Maarten, Tortola

== Accidents and incidents ==
On 24 March 2001, Air Caraïbes Flight 1501, a de Havilland DHC-6-300 Twin Otter arriving from Princess Juliana International Airport in Sint Maarten, suffered a loss of control on its approach to runway 10 and crashed into a house, killing all of its 19 occupants and an additional person on the ground.
