= Jet blast =

Rapid air movement produced by jet engines

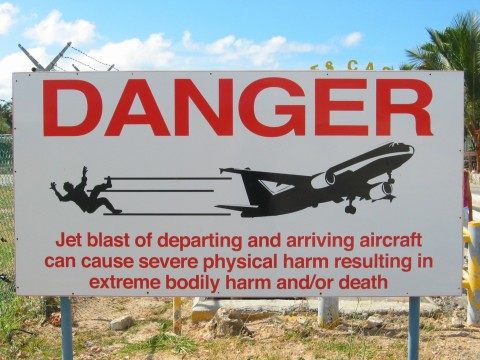
Sign near Princess Juliana International Airport warning passers-by about the risks of jet blast.

Jet blast is the phenomenon of rapid air movement produced by the jet engines of aircraft, particularly on or before takeoff. A large jet-engine aircraft can produce winds of up to 100 knots (190 km/h; 120 mph) as far away as 60 metres (200 ft) behind it at 40% maximum rated power. Jet blast can be a hazard to people or other unsecured objects, and can reach wind speeds comparable to those of a Category 5 hurricane, causing roof failure or total collapse in buildings, and severely damaging or destroying things like mobile homes, utility buildings, and trees.

Despite the power and potentially destructive nature of jet blast, there are relatively few jet blast incidents. Due to the invisible nature of jet blast and the aerodynamic properties of light aircraft, light aircraft moving about airports are particularly vulnerable. Pilots of light aircraft frequently stay off to the side of the runway, rather than follow in the centre, to negate the effect of the blast. Occasionally, when the ground surface is badly chosen, jet blast from aircraft can rip up sections of asphalt weighing up to tens of kilograms (double-digits of pounds), damaging the aircraft.

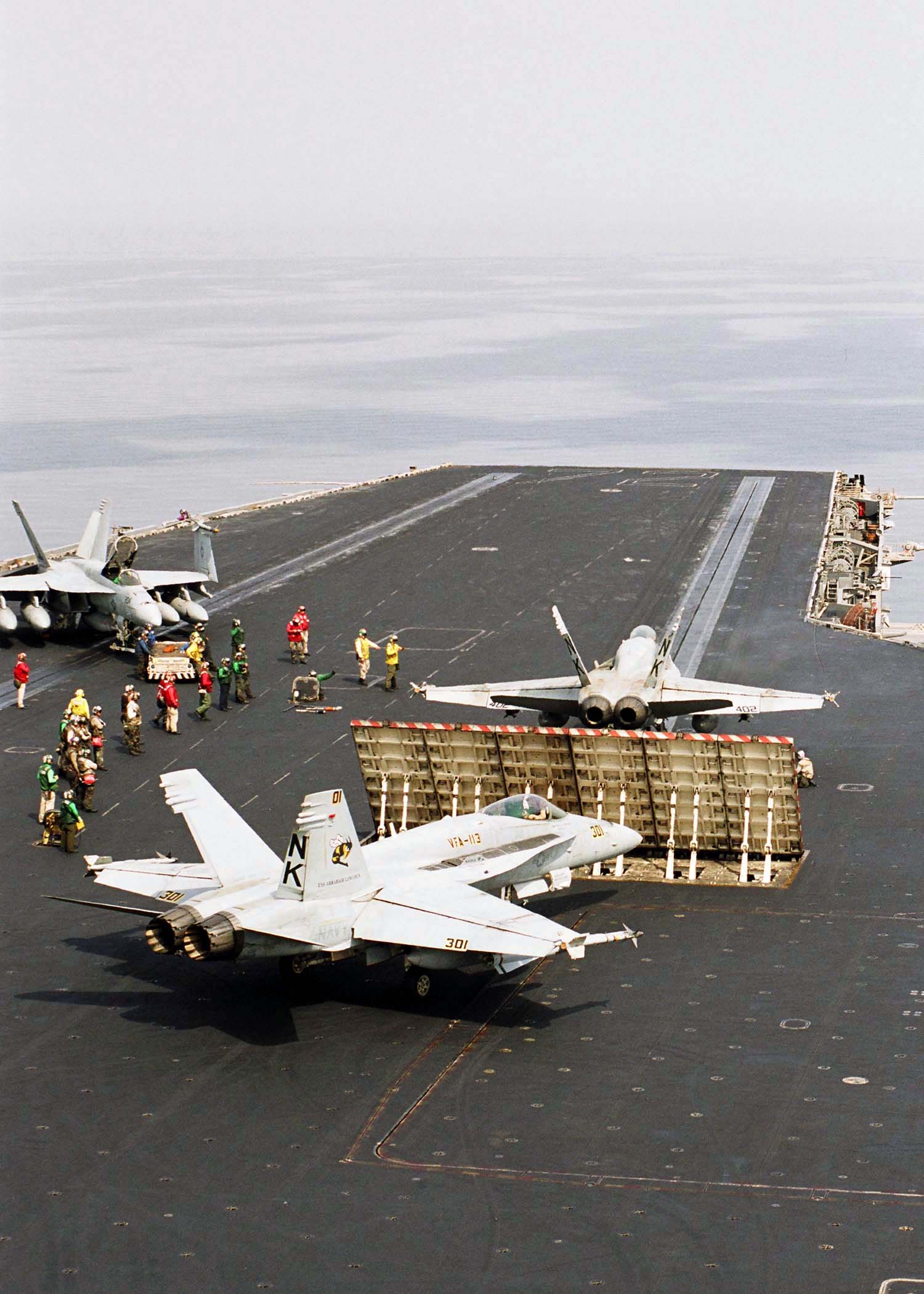
In 2003, aboard the USS Abraham Lincoln (CVN-72), a jet blast deflector is raised hydraulically to protect one F/A-18 Hornet from the jet exhaust of another.

Maho Beach in Sint Maarten is famous for its unique proximity to the runway of Princess Juliana International Airport, allowing people to experience jet blast, a practice that is discouraged by the local authorities. A tourist was killed on 12 July 2017 when she was blown away by jet blast, which caused her head to smash into concrete. Skiathos Airport in Greece similarly allows people to experience jet blast, as its runway is located near a public road.

Propeller planes are also capable of generating significant rearwards winds, known as prop wash.

== See also ==
- Maho Beach, a beach in Saint Maarten popular for experiencing jet blast
- Air Moorea Flight 1121, a plane crash in 2007 that investigators suspect jet blast was a factor
