= Skyway Enterprises =

Airline of the United States

IATA	ICAO	Call sign
KI	SKZ	SKYWAY-INC
- Founded: 1981
- Commenced operations: 1983
- Hubs: Kissimmee Gateway Airport; Miami International Airport
- Secondary hubs: Savannah/Hilton Head International Airport
- Fleet size: 4
- Destinations: 7
- Parent company: JMB Aviation Group
- Headquarters: Kissimmee, Florida, United States
- Website: skyway360.com

Skyway Enterprises Inc. is an American airline based in Kissimmee, Florida, United States. It operates domestic/international on demand cargo and passenger charter flights, as well as contract flights for FedEx, UPS, and Government.

== History ==
The airline was established in 1981 in Michigan as a Cessna dealership, and started operations with cargo charters in 1983. It moved operations to Kissimmee in 1989. In February 2021, Skyways was purchased by JMB Aviation Group, owner of Transcarga.

== Destinations ==
Country	City	Airport	Notes
Bahamas	Freeport	Grand Bahama International Airport	
Bahamas	Nassau	Lynden Pindling International Airport	
Cuba	Havana	José Martí International Airport	
Cuba	Guantánamo Bay	Leeward Point Field	
United States	Miami	Miami International Airport	Hub
United States	Orlando	Kissimmee Gateway Airport	Hub
United States	Savannah	Savannah/Hilton Head International Airport	Hub

== Fleet ==
=== Current fleet ===
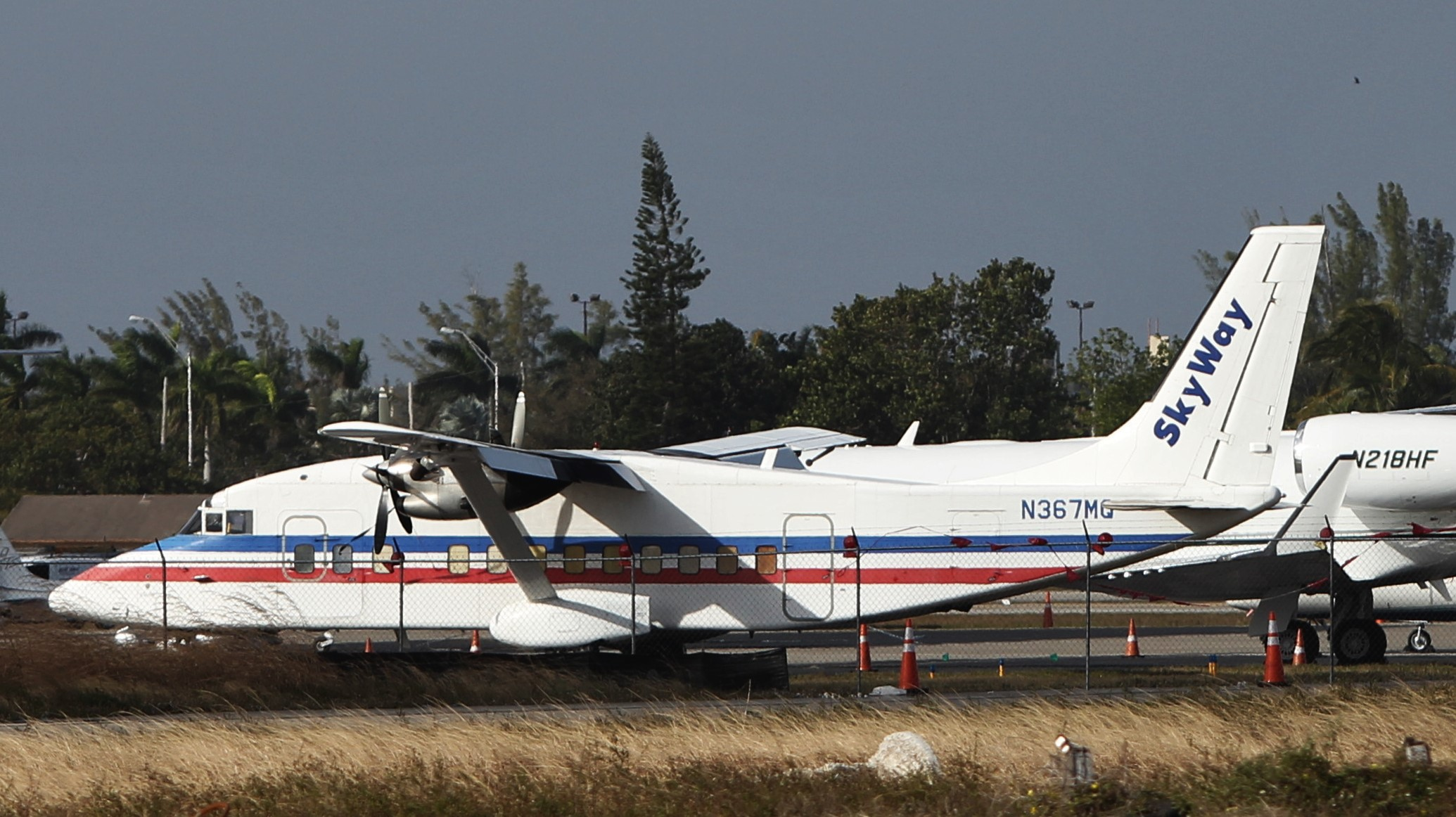
Skyway Enterprises Shorts SD-360-100

As of September 2022 the Skyway Enterprises fleet includes:

Skyway Enterprises fleet
Aircraft	In fleet	Orders	Notes
Shorts SD3-60	4	—	
Total	4		

=== Retired fleet ===
- 2 Learjet 23
- 1 Learjet 24D
- 1 McDonnell Douglas DC-9-15F
- 5 Shorts 330-200

== Accidents and incidents ==
- 2 February 1998 - Two Skyway Enterprises Shorts 330-200 (N2630A and N2629Y) were damaged beyond repair by a tornado at Miami International Airport. Both aircraft had to be written off. No one was injured.
- 9 April 2003 - Skyway Enterprises Shorts 330-200 (N805SW), on a flight from Pittsburgh was about to land at DuBois Regional Airport, Pennsylvania, when an engine surged, the pilot attempted to go around again to land and crashed left of the runway. The aircraft was substantially damaged but the two crew survived.
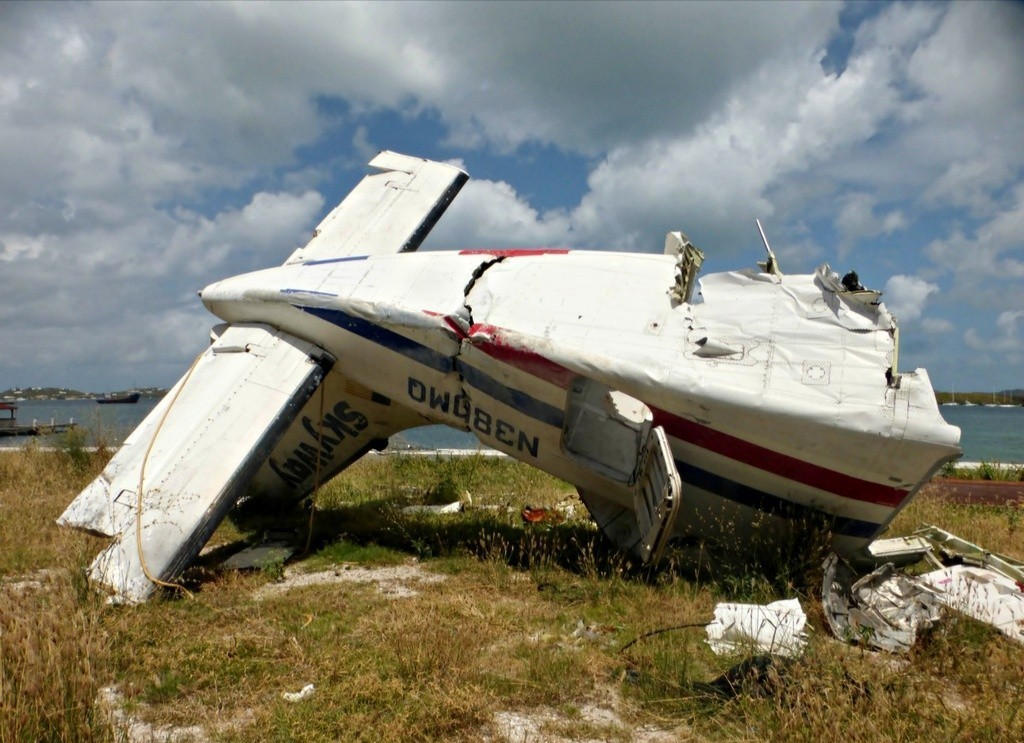
  Wreckage of Flight 7101 (N380MQ)
- 29 October 2014 - Skyway Enterprises Flight 7101, a Shorts 360-200 (N380MQ), on a flight from Princess Juliana International Airport, Netherlands Antilles to Luis Muñoz Marín International Airport, Puerto Rico, crashed into the water off Sint Maarten-Juliana Airport shortly after takeoff from runway 28, killing the two crewmen on board. The body of German national Eric Schnell (49), the pilot, was discovered the night of the incident. Co-pilot Rigoberto Lopez may still be strapped in his seat in the plane wreckage, according to Wendell Thode, Coast Guard Acting Head and Head of Operation.

== See also ==
- List of airlines of the United States
