= Maho Beach =

Beach on Saint Martin island

Coordinates: 18.03983°N 63.12069°W

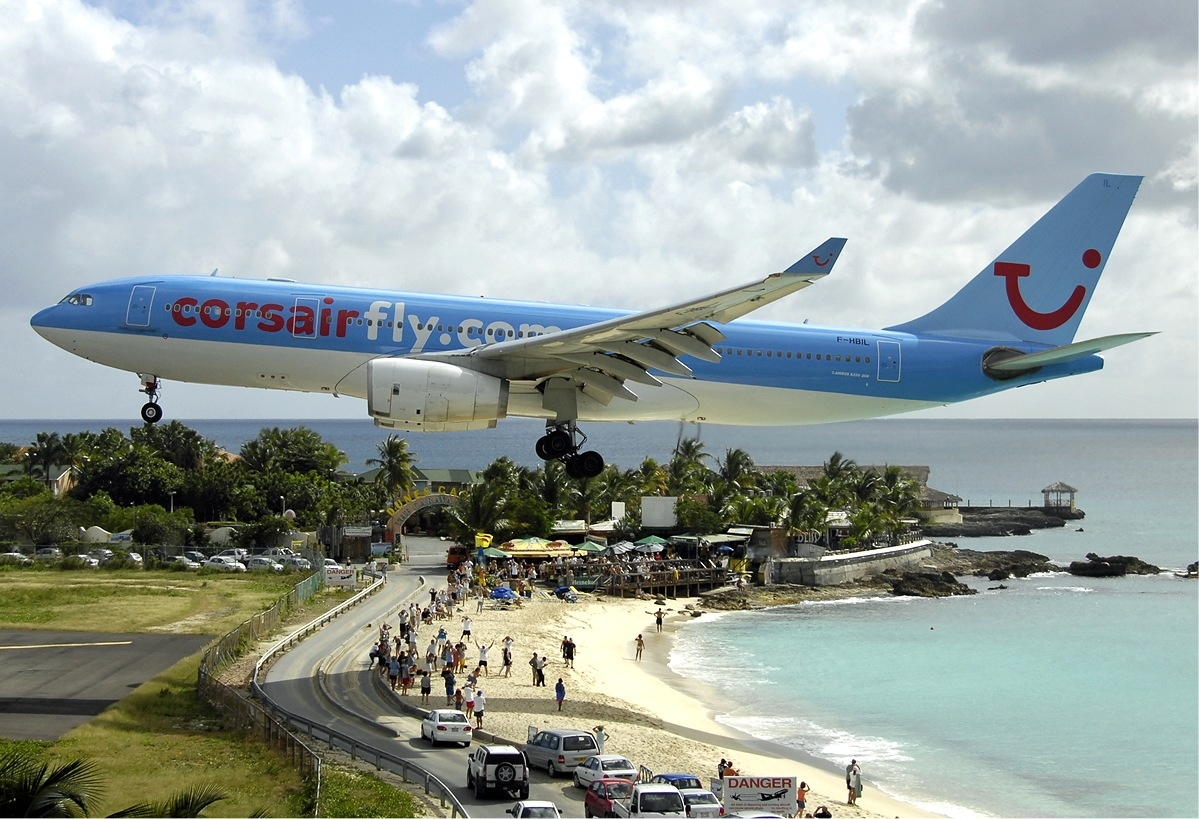
- Corsairfly Airbus A330-200 on final approach at St Maarten Airport
- Interactive map of Maho Beach
- Location: Saint Martin
- Status: Open

Maho Beach is a beach on the Dutch side of the Caribbean island of Saint Martin, in the territory of Sint Maarten. It has become famous for being adjacent to the Princess Juliana International Airport and therefore is a popular site for tourists and plane watchers, who visit the beach to watch aircraft fly very low over the beach on final approach to land at the airport.

== Location ==
Due to the unique proximity of low-flying airliners arriving and departing from Princess Juliana International Airport, the location is popular with plane spotters. This is one of the few places in the world where aircraft can be viewed in their flight path just outside the end of the runway. Watching airliners pass over the beach is such a popular activity that daily arrivals and departures airline timetables are displayed on a board in most bars and restaurants on the beach.

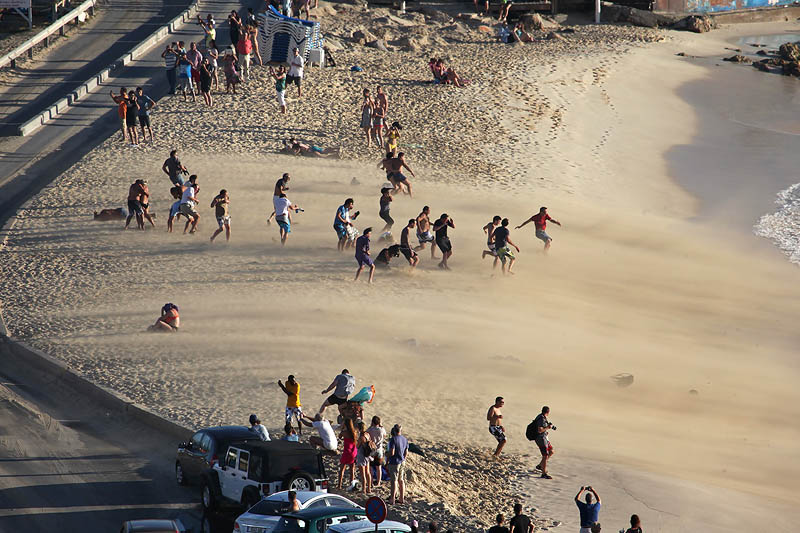
A group of tourists being blown by jet blast from an aircraft on the runway threshold

Maho Beach is unusually close to the threshold of a runway and is directly under the flight path, resulting in aircraft on their final approach flying over the beach at altitudes of less than 100 feet (30 m) above ground level. This makes the beach a popular location for photographers and video makers who intend to capture the aircraft approaching the airport.

People on the beach going on the runway

Visitors consistently underestimate the jet blast as the slowly approaching airplanes get ready for take-off. This applies to spectators of both larger and smaller jet propelled planes gearing up their motors right before departure. It results in many objects on the beach, from towels to more precious belongings, being tossed into the sea on a daily basis.

There is also a danger of people standing on the beach being blown into solid objects or the water because of the jet blast from aircraft taking off from runway 10. The local government warns that closely approaching and departing aircraft can "result in serious injury and/or death". An additional fence has been added recently behind runway 10, in order to prevent people from hanging onto the main fence surrounding the runway to experience being blasted by the jet flow.

The beach itself is white sand and has little to no vegetation because of jet blast erosion. The Morgan Resort, the Sunset Bar and other restaurants such as Jax, Tortuga's, Spices of India and Roma / Mr Chao are located nearby. The beach is popular with windsurfers and skimboarders because of occasional large waves.

== History ==
After the creation of a runway during the second world war, the "Caravanserai" and "Concord" of the Parker family were the first hotels to open up next to Maho Beach. The Parker family was known for its namesake sister hotel in the "Borscht belt" area of New York State.

With tourism, the attraction of the beach grew on its own merits. Better island roads allowed crowds from other hotels as well as cruise ships to experience the jet blasts and arrivals. The invention of social media and the internet further amplified the fame of Maho Beach, amongst others via webcams.

The two adjacent hotels over time were sold. Caravanserai first became "Alegria" and Morgan Resort after. The Concord was sold by the Parker family and has been known as Sonesta Maho Beach Resort for decades. Both remain well known bases for plane spotters.

On October 16, 2008, the Maho area of St. Maarten was badly damaged by Hurricane Omar, which destroyed the Sunset Bar and Grill as well as Bamboo Bernies and Bliss. In November 2009, the Sunset Bar and Grill and Bliss were both re-opened. Hurricane Omar reduced the beach to boulders and damaged the nearby Royal Islander Club La Plage, which re-opened February 14, 2009. The same occurred with Hurricane Irma in 2017.

On 12 July 2017, as Caribbean Airlines Flight 457 was taking off from the airport, a 57-year-old woman from New Zealand was killed by jet blast. The woman was holding on to a fence at the end of the runway when winds from the engines of the passenger plane blew her away, causing her head to smash into concrete.

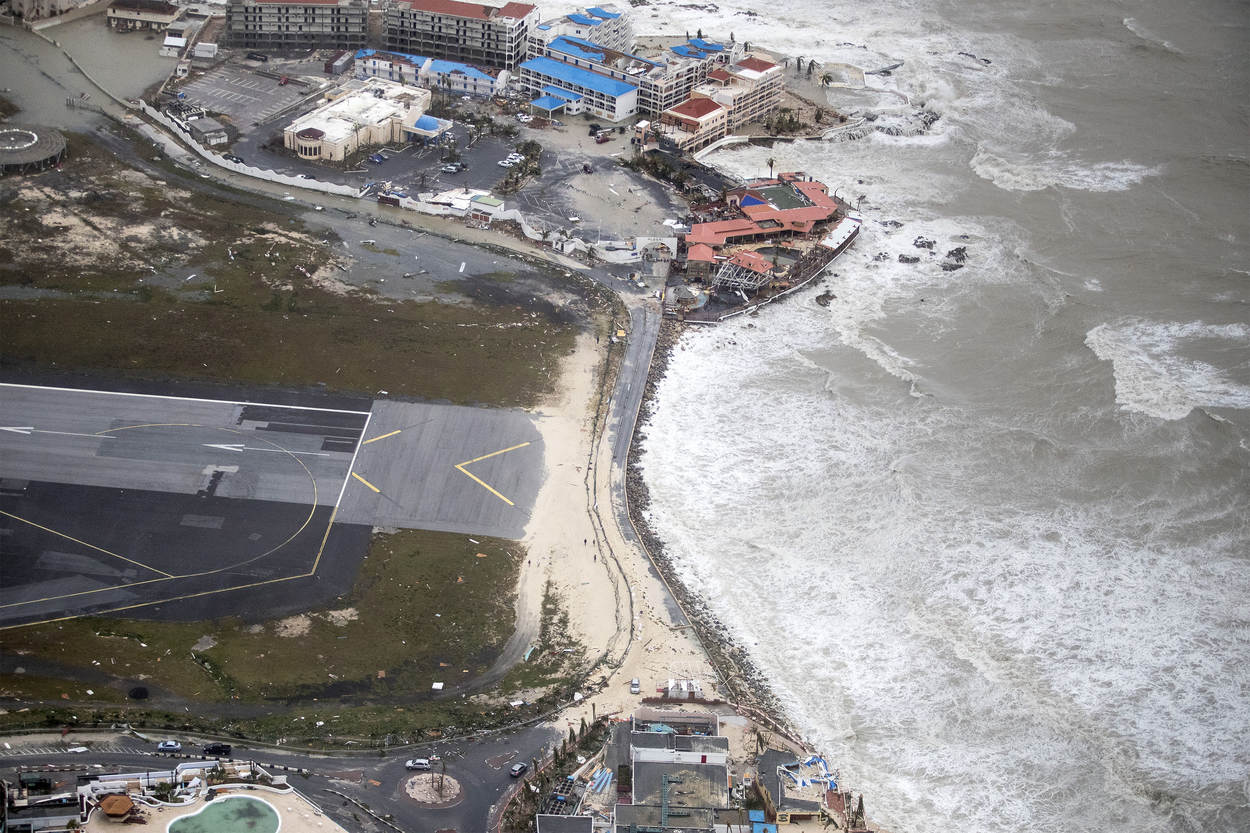
Maho Beach and Princess Juliana International Airport after Hurricane Irma damaged the area in 2017; much of the sand making up the beach was blown towards the airport and through the fence, settling before the threshold of the runway.

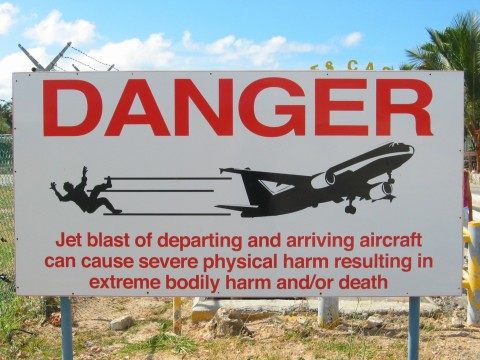
Sign on the beach warning people of the dangers of jet blast.

== See also ==
- Skiathos International Airport
