= Trans Anguilla Airways =

Anguillan airline

IATA	ICAO	Call sign
-	-	Trans Anguilla
- Founded: 1997
- Hubs: Clayton J. Lloyd International Airport
- Fleet size: 6
- Destinations: 26
- Parent company: Trans Anguilla Air 2000 Limited
- Website: http://www.transanguilla.com

Trans Anguilla Airways (TAA) is an air charter airline operating to and from Clayton J. Lloyd International Airport to points in the Caribbean.

== History ==
The Trans Anguilla Airways company was created in 1997. The company was founded by Joshua Gumbs of Rey Hill, Anguilla and operated by his brother Lincoln Gumbs (manager) and Carl Thomas (chief pilot).

From December 2010 to December 2011, Trans Anguilla Airways was exceptionally authorized to land and take off from the Virgin Gorda Airport, despite the fact that its fleet was not compliant with the airport's standards.

In July 2013, Trans Anguilla Airways launched a new service flight to Sint Eustatius.

== Destinations ==
Trans Anguilla Airways operates scheduled 7-minute flights between Anguilla and Sint Maarten. It offers private charters, shared charters, executive/corporate charters, sightseeing charters, inter-island charters, freight services, and air ambulance services connecting Anguilla to other islands in the Leeward Islands. TAA also offers sightseeing flights to neighbouring islands. TAA also have scheduled daily flights from Anguilla to islands such as, St Kitts, Nevis and Antigua. TAA operate flights to St Eustatius and St Barths but at a reduced frequency. You are able to use TAA to book charters to islands such as Montserrat and Virgin Gorda.

== Fleet ==
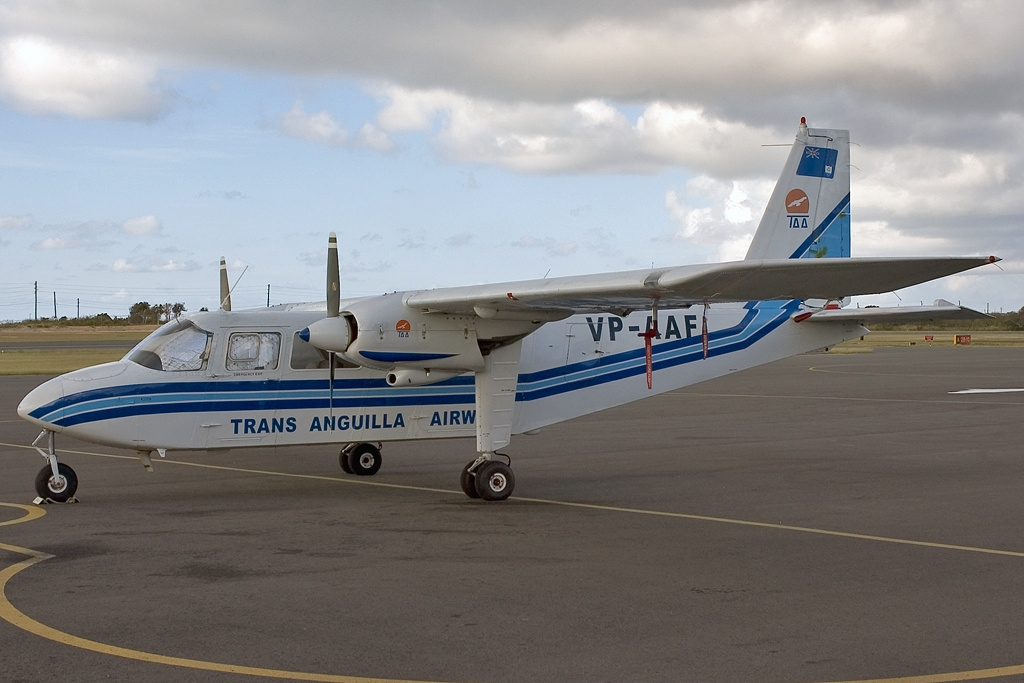
Trans Anguilla Airways Britten-Norman BN-2B-21 Islander

TAA fleet
Aircraft	In Fleet	Passengers	Notes
Britten-Norman BN-2 Islander	4	9	Regs: VP-AAA; VP-AAF; VP-AEJ, VP-AIA
Cessna 402	2	9	Regs: VP-AEW; VP-ALS

== Accident and incidents ==
In February 2008, a Britten-Norman BN-2A-26 Islander (registered VP-AAG) operated by Air Montserrat and leased by Trans Anguilla Airways crashed after takeoff. The aircraft was programmed for a cargo flight (no commercial passengers). Three passengers were on board and no fatalities were recorded.
