= Princess Juliana International Airport =

International airport serving Sint Maarten

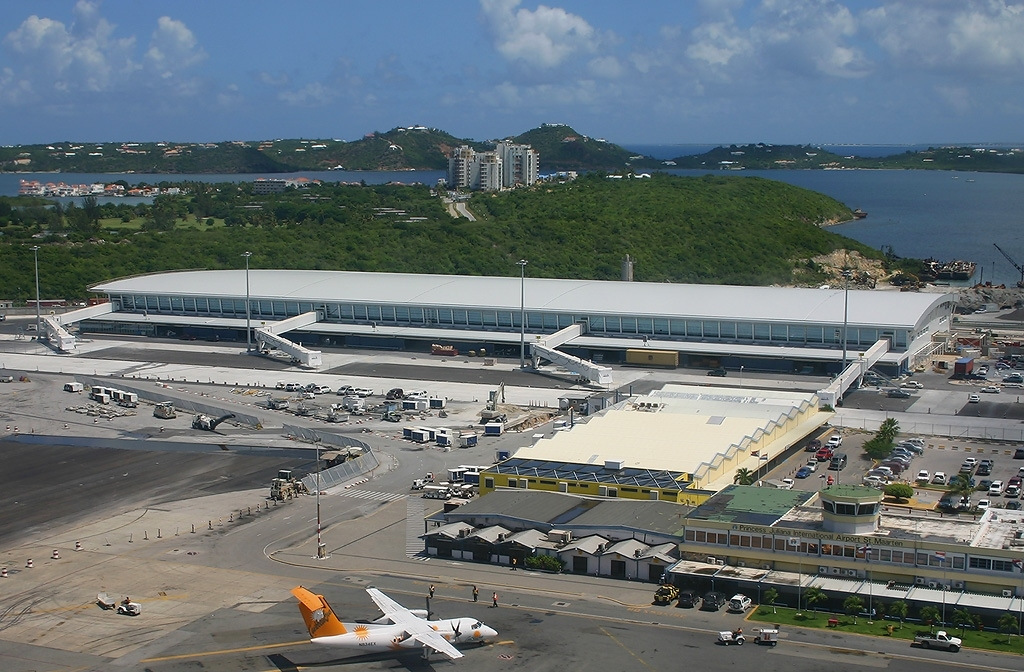
- IATA: SXM; ICAO: TNCM

Summary
- Airport type: Public
- Owner: Princess Juliana International Airport Holding Company N.V.
- Location: Sint Maarten (Saint-Martin)
- Hub for: Winair
- Elevation AMSL: 14 ft (4.3 m)
- Coordinates: 18°02′27″N 063°06′34″W
- Website: sxmairport.com

Map
- Location in Sint Maarten SXM (North America)

Runways
Direction	Length		Surface
Direction	m	ft	Surface
10/28	2,300	7,546	Asphalt concrete
- Source: airnav.com

Princess Juliana International Airport (IATA: SXM, ICAO: TNCM) is the main international airport serving the Caribbean island of Saint Martin and is located on the Dutch side of the island, in the country of Sint Maarten. The airport sits alongside Simpson Bay Lagoon and is one of the Caribbean's most recognizable airports, known for its famous approach over Maho Beach, where aircraft fly within feet of the beach on approach; making it a popular attraction for aviation enthusiasts and island visitors.

In 2025, the airport handled approximately 1.8 million passengers and 64,610 aircraft movements. The airport serves as a hub for Winair and is the major gateway for the smaller Leeward Islands, including Anguilla, Saba, Saint Barthélemy and Sint Eustatius.

Princess Juliana International is the island's primary aviation gateway and serves both the Dutch and French sides of Saint Martin. The island also has Grand Case-Espérance Airport, located on the French side of the island, which also handles general aviation and smaller regional traffic to surrounding French islands.

== History ==
=== Foundation and early years ===
The airport began as a United States military airstrip in 1942, during World War II. The first commercial flight landed December 3, 1943. In 1944, the then future Queen Juliana of the Netherlands visited the island using the airfield, which was later named in her honor.

As air travel and tourism to Saint Martin grew, the airport underwent several major upgrades. In 1964, the airport was remodeled and relocated, with a new passenger terminal and control tower. Further improvements followed in 1985 and 2001, as increasing passenger traffic placed greater demands on the airport's facilities.

=== Modernization and expansion ===
Continued growth in passenger traffic led to the development of a three-phase masterplan in 1997 to modernize the airport and increase its capacity. Phase I focused on improving the existing infrastructure, including widening, strengthening and renovating the runway, upgrading the taxiways, expanding the aircraft apron and renovating the existing terminal. Phase I was completed in 2001.

Phase II brought more extensive improvements, including a new radar facility and air traffic control tower, as well as a new and more modern, 27,000 square metre (290,000 sq ft) passenger terminal, designed to handle 2.5 million passengers annually. Runway End Safety Areas (RESAs) measuring 150 metres (490 ft), including 60-metre (200 ft) overrun areas, were constructed at both ends of the runway to meet International Civil Aviation Organization (ICAO) standards. The new control tower and radar facility entered service on March 29, 2004, while the new terminal opened in 2006. The terminal included four passenger boarding bridges capable of serving large aircraft, three of which could accommodate a Boeing 747.

The original masterplan also included a third phase, which was conditional on passenger traffic reaching projected levels. The proposed Phase III called for an extension of the passenger terminal and construction of a full parallel taxiway system. The phase was not completed as originally planned.

=== Border controls ===
In 1994, the Kingdom of the Netherlands and France signed the Franco-Dutch treaty on Saint Martin border controls. The treaty provided for joint Franco-Dutch border controls on so-called "risk flights", requiring arriving passengers to have valid travel documents for both sides of the island.

The treaty was ratified by the Netherlands in November 2006 and entered into force on August 1, 2007. Implementation was subsequently delayed for several years by the government of Sint Maarten.

=== KLM Boeing 747 Operations ===
For decades, the Boeing 747 was one of the most recognizable aircraft to operate scheduled service to Princess Juliana International Airport, with KLM operating the type on its Amsterdam–Sint Maarten service. Its low approach over Maho Beach made the aircraft a major attraction for aviation enthusiasts and tourists.

In 2016, KLM replaced the Boeing 747 with an Airbus A330, with the final scheduled 747 flight arriving on October 28, 2016. Large crowds gathered at Maho Beach to witness its final arrival and departure. The 747 briefly returned in September 2017 to operate relief flights following Hurricane Irma. KLM operates a mix of the Airbus A330 and the Boeing 787 on this route.

=== Hurricane Irma and reconstruction ===
On September 6, 2017, Hurricane Irma struck Sint Maarten as a Category 5 hurricane, bringing maximum sustained winds of approximately 185 mph (295 km/h). Princess Juliana International Airport sustained extensive damage, with much of the terminal's roof torn away, several passenger boarding bridges damaged, and sand and floodwater covering portions of the runway and surrounding facilities. Hurricanes Jose and Maria also affected the island later that month, further complicating the recovery effort.

The damage forced the airport to suspend normal commercial operations. In the immediate aftermath, the airport was used primarily for humanitarian, emergency and reconstruction flights while crews worked to restore basic infrastructure. Commercial airline service resumed on October 10, 2017, using temporary facilities, with passengers processed through temporary tents and pavilions while portions of the terminal remained out of service. Arrival and departure operations gradually returned to the terminal as initial repairs were completed.

The long-term reconstruction became a major infrastructure project supported by the Sint Maarten Trust Fund, the World Bank and the European Investment Bank. Major reconstruction work began in 2021, with Ballast Nedam International Projects serving as the general contractor. The project restored the passenger terminal and boarding bridges while upgrading baggage handling, security, passenger-processing systems and other infrastructure, with improvements designed to increase the airport's resilience to future hurricanes.

The reconstructed departure hall reopened in January 2024, followed by the new arrival hall in October 2024. On November 14, 2024, Princess Juliana International Airport was officially recommissioned following the completion of the major terminal reconstruction, restoring its designed passenger-handling capacity of 2.5 million passengers annually.

== Facilities ==
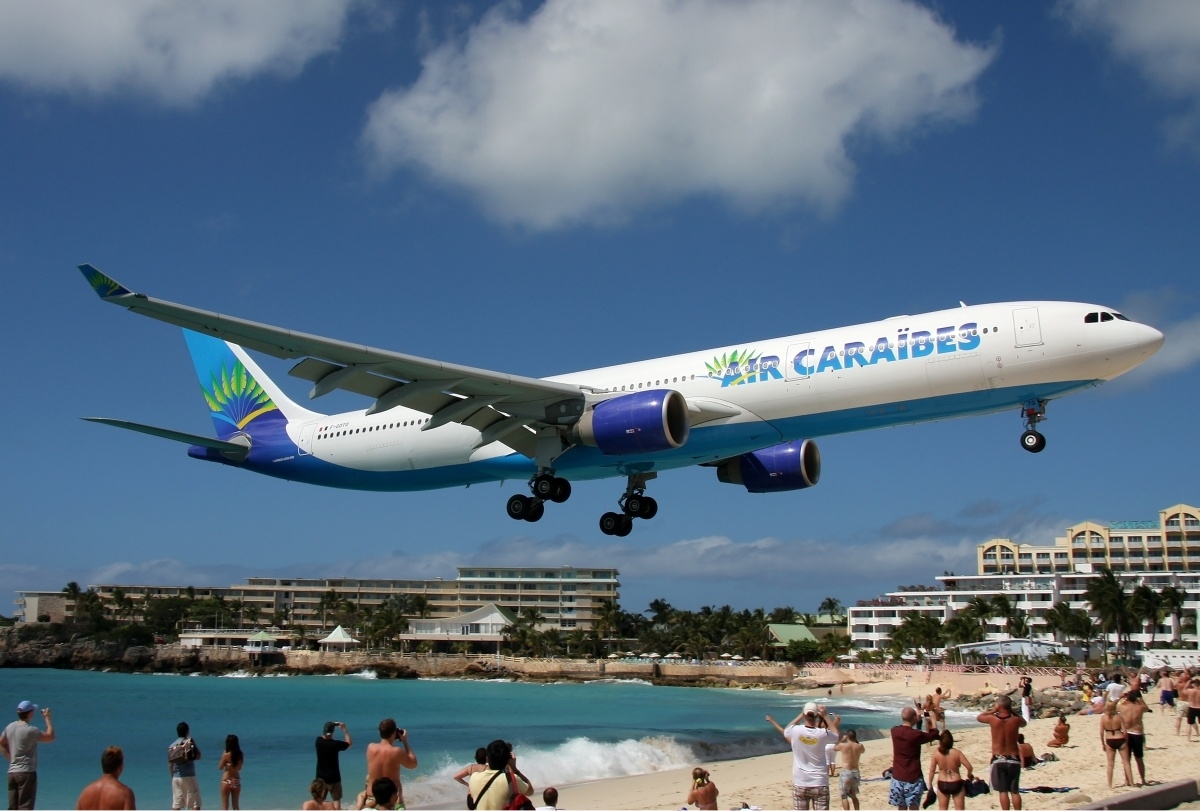
An Air Caraïbes Airbus A330-300 flying over Maho Beach shortly before touchdown

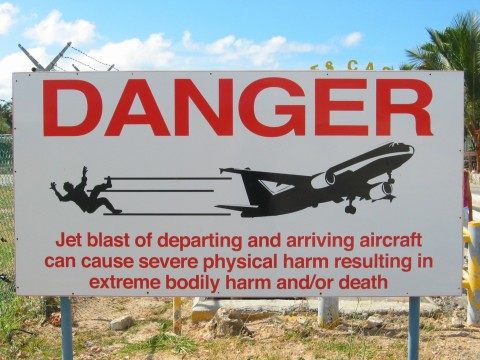
Warning sign between runway 10 and Maho Beach

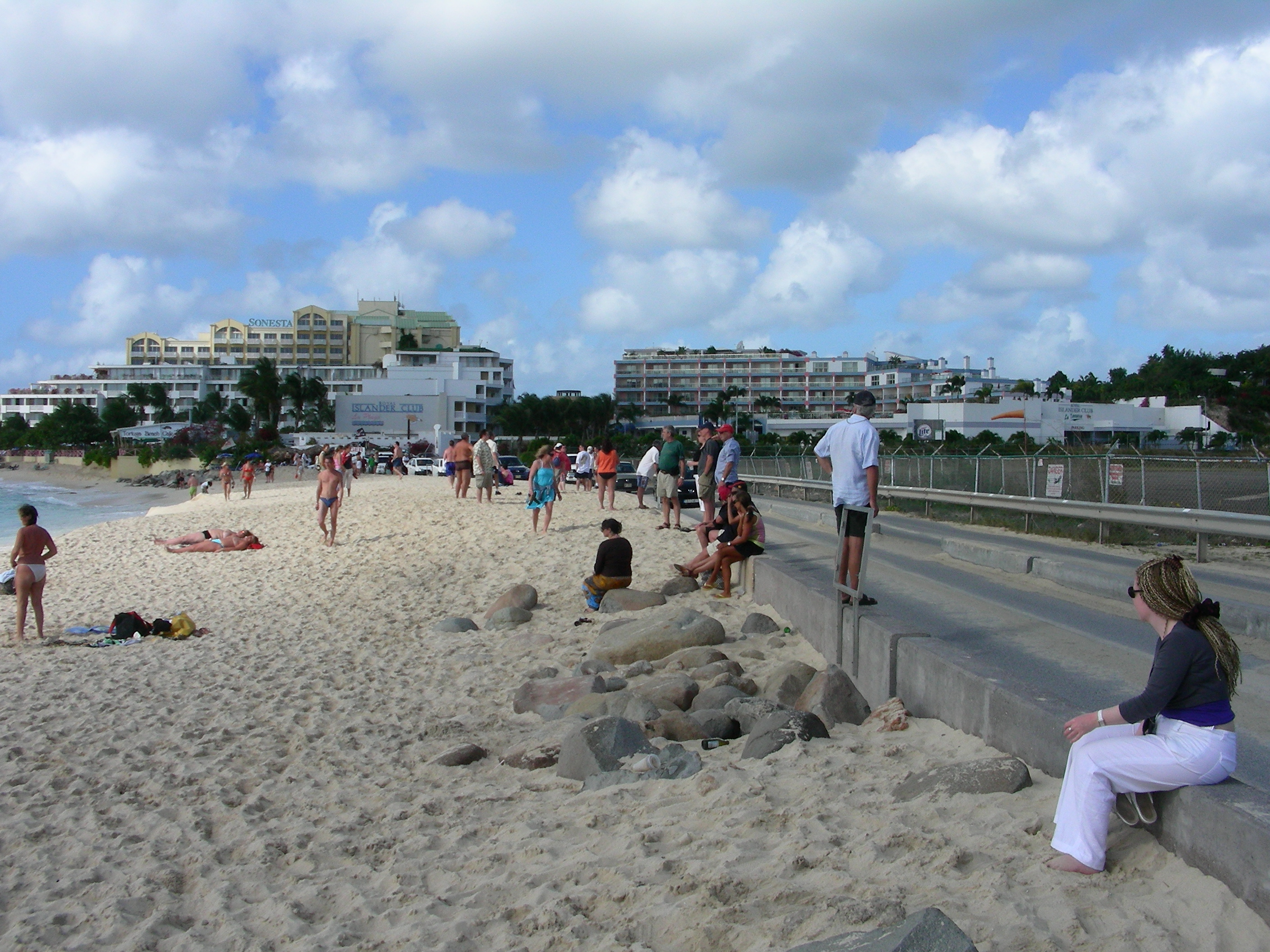
Spectators at Maho Beach

=== Runway and Maho Beach Approach ===
Princess Juliana International Airport has a single asphalt runway, designated 10/28, measuring 2,300 by 45 metres (7,546 by 148 ft). The runway is equipped for GNSS approaches, while visual approaches are also conducted. Local airport procedures restrict aircraft from descending below 500 ft (150 m) until established on the appropriate approach.

The final approach to Runway 10 passes directly over Maho Beach. Aircraft descend on an approximately 3° glide path before crossing the beach at low altitude, making the approach one of the most recognizable in commercial aviation. The location has become a major attraction for aviation enthusiasts and planespotters, with viewing areas along Maho Beach providing close views of arriving aircraft.

The proximity of the runway to Maho Beach also creates safety concerns, particularly from jet blast produced by departing aircraft. Warning signs are posted around the beach and surrounding areas to alert visitors to the hazards associated with aircraft operations.

=== Apron ===
The airport's main aircraft apron covers approximately 72,500 square metres (780,000 sq ft), with an additional 5,000-square-metre (54,000 sq ft) eastern apron. A separate freight apron covers approximately 7,000 square metres (75,000 sq ft).

The apron accommodates scheduled commercial aircraft, regional and charter operations, general aviation, cargo, and other aircraft movements.

=== Passenger Terminal ===
The passenger terminal provides facilities for arriving and departing international flights and is designed to handle up to 2.5 million passengers annually. The state-of-the-art facility includes dedicated areas for check-in, security screening, departures, arrivals, immigration, baggage claim and customs. The check-in area features airline counters, hybrid self-service bag-drop facilities and dedicated facilities for oversized baggage. A new curbside baggage-drop facility is under development and is expected to open in late 2026.

After checking in, passengers pass through centralized security screening into the departure hall. Facial-recognition technology is used during security and immigration processing, while digital flight-information displays, modern baggage-handling systems and passenger boarding bridges support passenger processing throughout the terminal. The departure hall also features seating areas, retail and duty-free shops, restaurants, cafés and other food and beverage facilities. Free Wi-Fi is available throughout the terminal, and the Princess Sky Lounge near Gate A1 provides additional seating, food and beverages, business facilities and high-speed Wi-Fi.

For arriving passengers, the terminal provides immigration, three baggage-claim belts and customs facilities before leading into the Arrival Hall, where taxis, car rentals and shuttle services are available. Passengers connecting to other Caribbean islands can use a separate immigration and connection process before continuing to their onward flight.

The terminal also provides accessible parking, wheelchair and mobility assistance, clear signage and public audio announcements. Facilities are available for service animals and pets.

=== General Aviation and Cargo ===
Princess Juliana International Airport handles general aviation, private and charter aircraft alongside scheduled commercial services. General aviation and private aviation facilities include passenger lounges, dedicated customs and immigration facilities, crew facilities, office space, and a fixed-base operator (FBO) providing aircraft handling, fueling, ground support and flight coordination.

Cargo operations are conducted separately from the main passenger terminal and use dedicated cargo facilities and a freight apron. The airport handles general freight as well as specialized shipments, including perishables, pharmaceuticals, live animals, mail and express consignment

=== Tower and Radar Services ===
Air traffic services at Princess Juliana International Airport are provided from the airport's control tower and radar facility that sits upon a hill overlooking the airport. The air traffic controllers have two radar systems at their disposal with ranges of 50 nautical miles (93 km) and 250 nautical miles (460 km). The airport is equipped with radar and navigation aids including VOR/DME and NDB systems. The Juliana Terminal Control Area (TCA) covers approximately 4,000 square nautical miles and provides approach control services for Princess Juliana and several nearby airports, including those in Anguilla, Saint Barthélemy, Saba, Sint Eustatius and the French side of Saint Martin. Air traffic control services operate between 07:00 and 21:00.

=== Airport Rescue and Firefighting ===
Princess Juliana International Airport maintains a Category 9 Aircraft Rescue and Fire Fighting (ARFF) service, providing emergency response and fire protection for aircraft operations at the airport.

== Airlines and Destinations ==
=== Passenger ===
The following airlines provide daily or weekly service to the following destinations:

Airlines	Destinations
Air Canada	Toronto–Pearson; Seasonal: Montréal–Trudeau
Air Caraïbes	Paris–Orly, Pointe-à-Pitre (begins 8 January 2027)
Air Century	Santo Domingo–La Isabela
Air France	Paris–Charles de Gaulle; Seasonal: Pointe-à-Pitre
Air Transat	Montréal–Trudeau; Seasonal: Toronto–Pearson
American Airlines	Charlotte, Miami, Philadelphia; Seasonal: Chicago–O'Hare, New York–JFK
Anguilla Air Services	Anguilla
Arajet	Santo Domingo–Las Américas
Caribbean Airlines	Barbados, Kingston–Norman Manley, Port of Spain
Contour Airlines	Saint Thomas, San Juan
Copa Airlines	Panama City–Tocumen
Delta Air Lines	Atlanta, New York–JFK
InterCaribbean Airways	Barbados
JetBlue	Boston, Fort Lauderdale, New York–JFK
KLM	Amsterdam, Georgetown–Cheddi Jagan, Port of Spain
La Compagnie	Seasonal charter: Newark
Liat Air	Antigua
Southwest Airlines	Baltimore, Orlando
St Barth Commuter	St. Barthélemy
Sun Country Airlines	Seasonal: Minneapolis/St. Paul
Sunrise Airways	Antigua, Cap-Haïtien, St. Kitts
United Airlines	Newark, Washington–Dulles; Seasonal: Chicago–O'Hare
WestJet	Montréal–Trudeau, Toronto–Pearson
Winair	Antigua, Aruba, Barbados, Bonaire, Castries, Curaçao, Dominica–Douglas-Charles, Montserrat, Nevis, Port of Spain, Saba, St. Barthélemy, St. Eustatius, St. Kitts, St. Vincent–Argyle, Tortola
Z Air	Curaçao

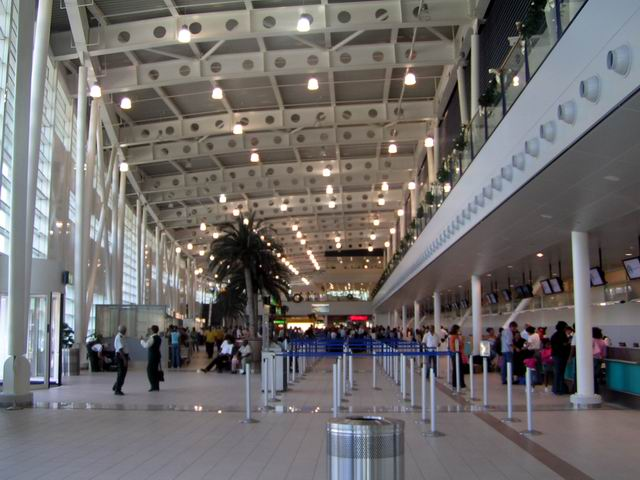
Terminal interior

=== Cargo ===
Airlines	Destinations
Air Cargo Carriers	San Juan
Amerijet International	Miami

== Accidents and Incidents ==
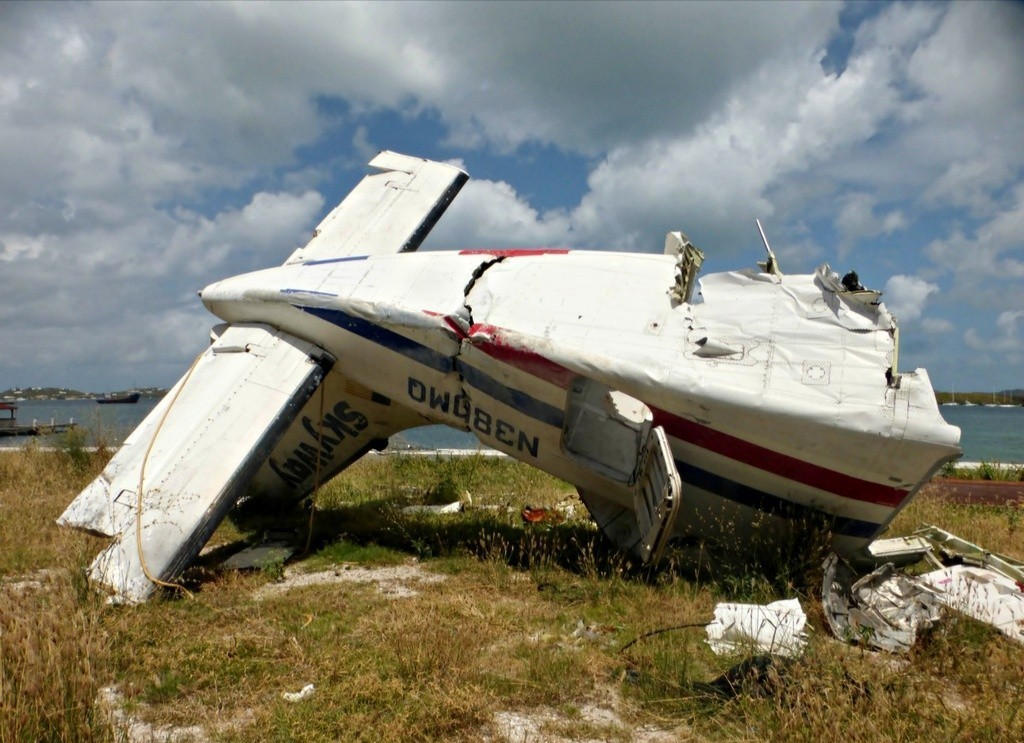
The wreckage of Skyway Enterprises Flight 7101

- On 21 December 1972, a De Havilland Canada Twin Otter operated by Air Guadeloupe on behalf of Air France crashed at night into the ocean near Sint Maarten, en route from Guadeloupe; all 11 passengers on board, along with both pilots, died.
- On 29 October 2014, Skyway Enterprises Flight 7101, a Shorts SD-360 (registration N380MQ) flying on behalf of FedEx crashed into the ocean 2 nmi (3.7 km) southwest of the airport, killing both pilots. The investigation concluded that the pilot flying suffered from a night-time somatogravic illusion after the flaps were retracted, causing the pilot to pitch the plane down into the sea.
- In 2017 a New Zealand woman died from injuries sustained by jet blast from a departing aircraft. Tourists have been often criticized for dangerous behavior on the beach.

== In popular culture ==
- The History Channel program Most Extreme Airports ranks Princess Juliana Airport as the 4th-most dangerous airport in the world.

== See also ==
- List of airports in Saint Martin
- List of the busiest airports in the Caribbean
- Phuket International Airport
- Skiathos Island National Airport
- Sunset Bar and Grill
