= Capital Airlines (UK) =

UK-based airline

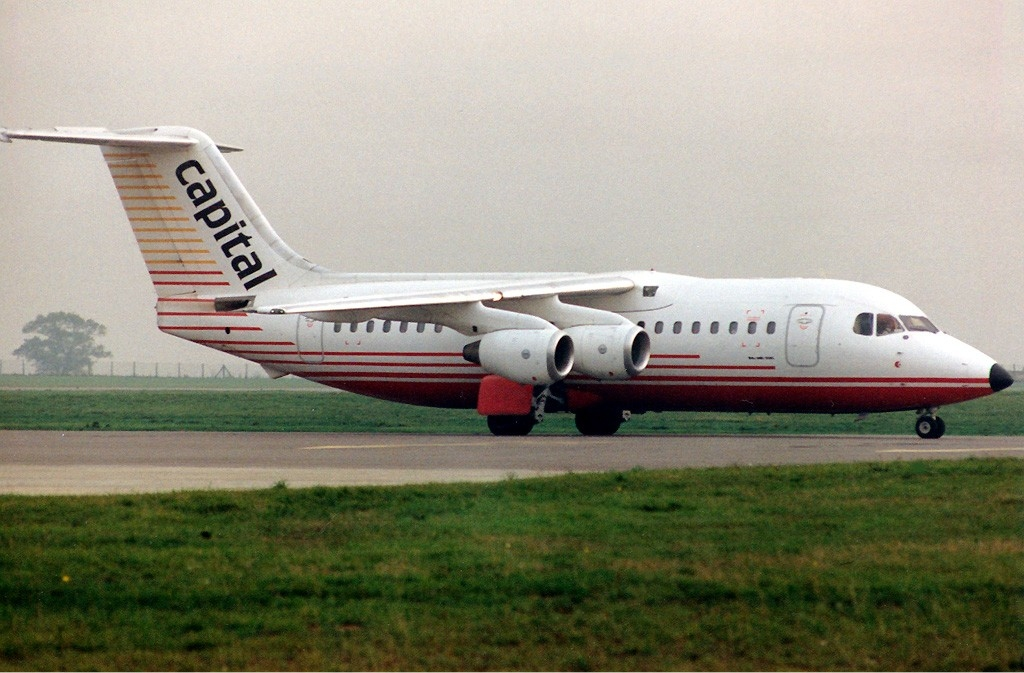
- British Aerospace BAe 146-200
IATA	ICAO	Call sign
BZ	CPG	CAPITAL
- Founded: 1987
- Ceased operations: 1990
- Destinations: UK & Europe
- Headquarters: Leeds Bradford Airport
- Key people: Adrian Thompson, MD

Capital Airlines was an airline based in the United Kingdom and self-proclaimed Yorkshire International Airlines. It operated a fleet of BAe 146's and Shorts 360's between 1987 and 1990. It was the first airline to be based at Leeds Bradford Airport.

== History ==
Modest beginnings

The airline came into being in 1984 as Brown Air Services Ltd., a subsidiary of the Brown Group which specialised in the sales and maintenance of heavy plant equipment. It flew a Cessna 441 Conquest II (G-MOXY) on services from Leeds Bradford to Oslo, originally flown as a corporate shuttle but then opened up for public bookings. An afternoon service from Leeds Bradford to Frankfurt was later introduced. The Conquest was then replaced with a Grumman Gulfstream 1 turboprop.

Scheduled services to Glasgow were introduced on 1 October 1984 with a Short 330 aircraft after the previous operator, Metropolitan Airways, had ceased trading. The 330 was later returned to its leasing company and the scheduled routes to Oslo and Frankfurt were discontinued. The sole Gulfstream was then operated on a regular Leeds-Glasgow-Leeds-Cardiff service, introducing the first direct services from Leeds to Cardiff and a through-flight from Glasgow to Cardiff. The Gulfstream 1 proved a popular aircraft and operated 50 sectors a week for a full year with a 100% dispatch recordHall, Alan W. (1–14 May 1987). "Brown Air starts first UK scheduled service". Aviation News. Feltham: 1210-1211..

Capital Airlines

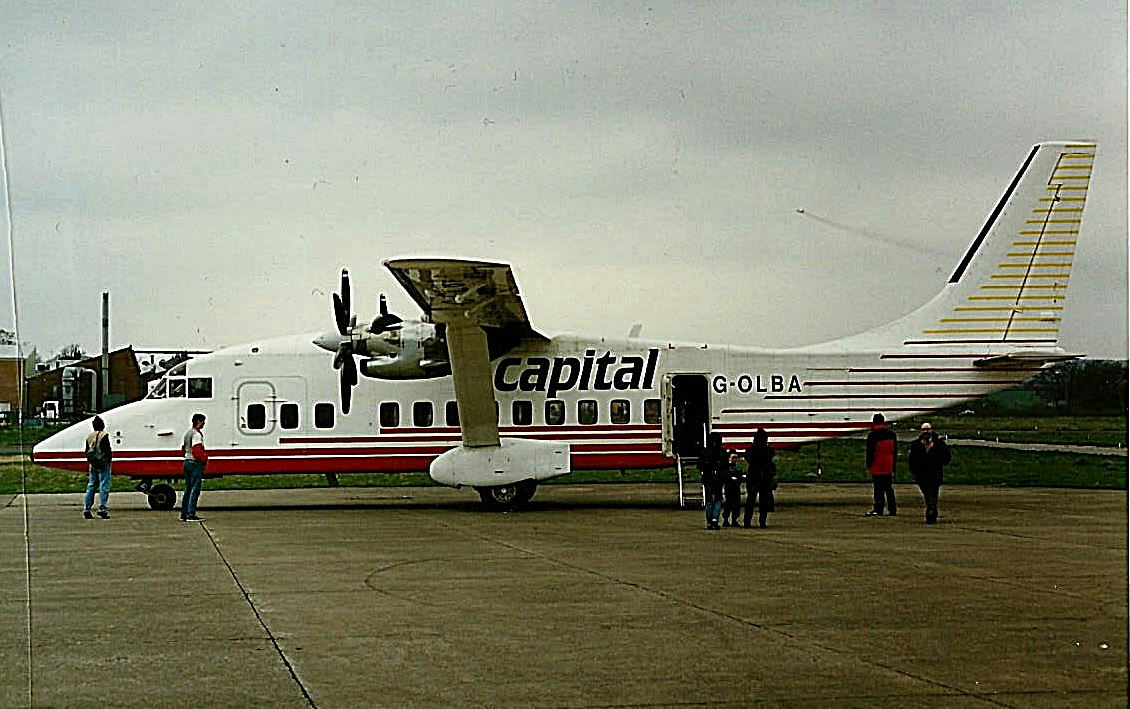
Short 360

The Gulfstream soon became too small to service demand and on 12 October 1987 the air carrier was renamed Capital Airlines and took delivery of the first Short 360-300, being the first airline to operate the twin turboprop with a 39 seats cabin.

Its route network was expanded progressively to include routes from Leeds Bradford to Belfast City and Dublin, a new Leeds-Edinburgh-Leeds-Southampton operation and services from Leeds Bradford to the Channel Islands, London Gatwick and Brussels. Services between London Luton and Belfast City were also introduced at that time. In 1988 the airline was one of the first to adopt a low cost pricing model with seats priced at £13/£26/£39 (lowest price for early booking) between LTN & BHD, undercutting BA cheapest price of £45 between London & Belfast.

From 1988, the fleet of leased Short 360 aircraft, were expanded as routes were commenced. An extensive range of charter flights from the Channel Islands were offered, together with scheduled services from Cardiff to Jersey and Guernsey as well as Royal Mail flights from Belfast Aldergrove to East Midlands. A short-lived attempt to operate Dublin-Belfast City scheduled services also took place towards the end of Capital's existence.

Capital took over the long-established maintenance and light aircraft operations of Northair at Leeds Bradford, providing access to hangar facilities, office space and the establishment of its own reservations centre and catering service at the airport.

With a Short 360 fleet of six leased aircraft the airline embarked upon the expansion to service the demand on its Belfast-Luton and Dublin-Luton services which were running at near full capacity and in 1989 leased two British Aerospace BAe 146-200 jet aircraft, formerly operated by Air Wisconsin of the USA. These were used to expand its services from London Luton with the upgrade of the Belfast City service from the 39-seat Short 360 to the 106-seat jet; a service linking Leeds Bradford with Luton each day was effectively a positioning flight to return the 146 to the Leeds Bradford base and rotate the two BAe 146 aircraft to Leeds Bradford every other day. The BAe 146 aircraft also flew weekend charters from Leeds Bradford and Manchester for Intasun to destinations including in the summer season Malaga and Palma and Salzburg in the winter season.

The airline abruptly ceased operations in June 1990 as a result of Brown Group International, its parent company, declaring itself bankrupt due to their bankers in Norway withdrawing their financing of the group activities and the calling of the groups borrowing "cross guarantees" by the bank to repay the outstanding loans. The two leased BAe 146s were repossessed by British Aerospace and re-registered to them on 9 August 1990, while the leased Short 360s were repossessed by Shorts.

At the conclusion of the bankruptcy the Capital Airlines subsidiary of the Brown Group was "technically" solvent being GBP 4,000,000 "in the black" if Brown Group had been able to repay the GBP 12,000,000 it owed to the airline. This was not possible as Brown Group had debts in excess of GBP 20,000,000.

A number of companies looked to acquire Capital but ultimately decided not to go ahead. The primary Capital routes were later taken up by Jersey European (Leeds-Belfast City and Leeds-Jersey from 1991); Loganair (Leeds-Glasgow from July 1990) and later Yorkshire European (Leeds-Southampton). Its two 146 and six Shorts 360-300 aircraft went on to operate for other airlines.

The assets of Capital and the Northair subsidiary were acquired by Lambson Aviation for around GBP 700,000.

== See also ==
- List of defunct airlines of the United Kingdom
