= Flight 114 =

Flight 114 may refer to the following accidents involving commercial airliners:

Listed chronologically

- Bonanza Air Lines Flight 114, crashed on 15 November 1964
- Serviços Aéreos Cruzeiro do Sul Flight 114, hijacked on 1 January 1970
- Libyan Arab Airlines Flight 114, shot down on 21 February 1973
- Nightexpress Flight 114, crashed on 30 June 1999
- Thai Airways International Flight 114, destroyed in a fuel tank explosion on 3 March 2001
- Nari Air Flight 114, crashed on 25 November 2025

== See also ==
- STS-114, a successful Space Shuttle mission in July–August 2005
