= Community Express Airlines =

IATA	ICAO	Call sign
5V	UNI	Community
- Founded: 1993
- Commenced operations: 1995
- Ceased operations: 1996
- Hubs: Birmingham; East Midlands; London Gatwick
- Alliance: none
- Fleet size: 4
- Destinations: 6
- Website: none

Community Express Airlines is a defunct airline that was based in the United Kingdom. Its IATA and ICAO codes were 5V and UNI, respectively.

== History ==
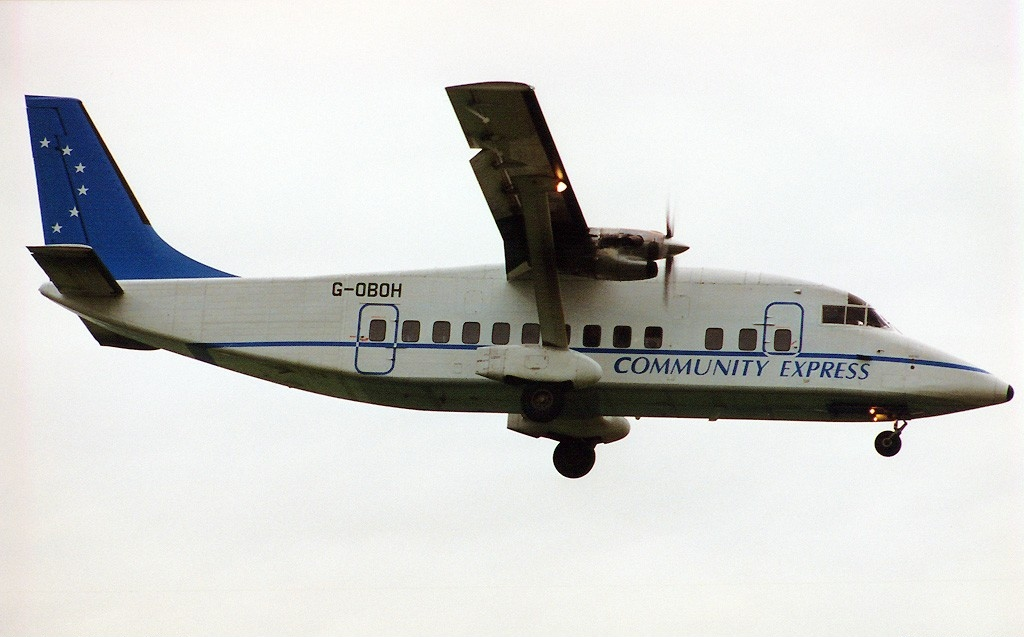
Short 360

The airline was incorporated on 29 July 1993. The airline started service on 23 October 1995. Two Shorts 360 aircraft were acquired from one of the airline's major shareholder, Mesa Airlines, a United States commuter airline.

Services were started between Birmingham, East Midlands and London Gatwick. Later, a service between East Midlands and Belfast City was started. On 2 August 1996, a Liverpool - Belfast International service was started. At that time, the airline operated two Shorts 360 and two Jetstream 31 aircraft.

On 1 October 1996, the airline ceased operating and the assets were liquidated.

== Fleet ==
- 3 x Short 360
- 3 x Jetstream 31

== See also ==
- List of defunct airlines of the United Kingdom
