= Gill Airways =

UK regional airline

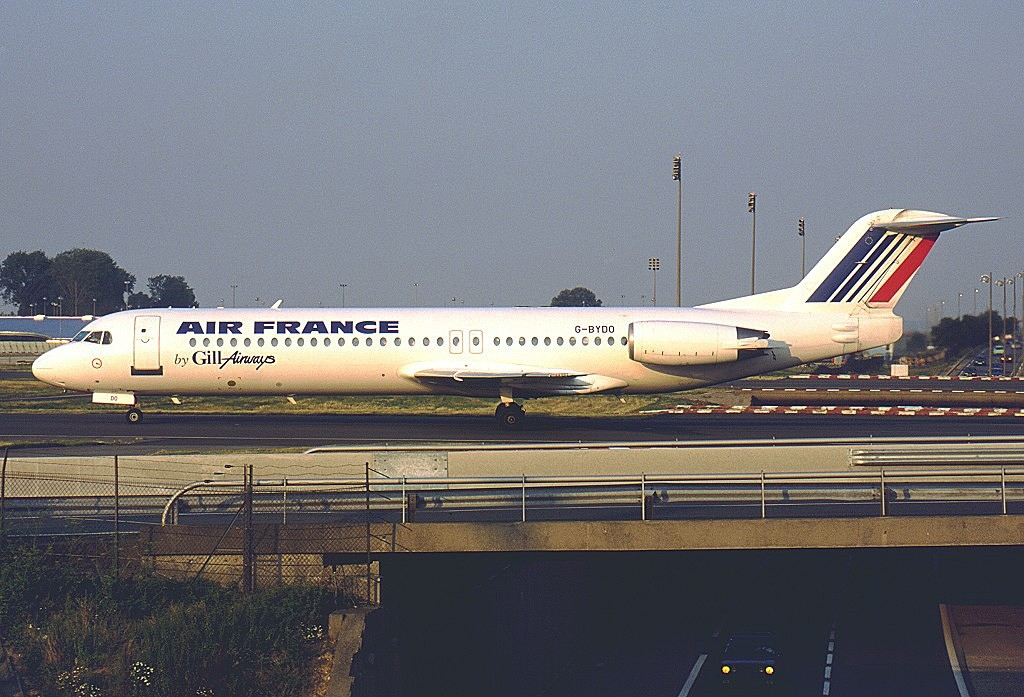
- Fokker 100 operated on Air France behalf in 2001
IATA	ICAO	Call sign
9C	GIL	GILLAIR
- Founded: 1969 (as Gill Aviation)
- Commenced operations: 1970
- Ceased operations: 20 September 2001 (as Gill Airways)
- Operating bases: Newcastle Airport
- Headquarters: Newcastle Airport, Newcastle-upon-Tyne, England, United Kingdom
- Key people: Michael Gill (Founder)
- Website: gill-airways.com

Gill Airways was a regional airline with its head office in New Aviation House on the grounds of Newcastle Airport in Newcastle-upon-Tyne, England, United Kingdom.

== History ==
Founded in 1969 by Michael Gill, the company was originally Gill Aviation Ltd.', mainly providing cargo and mail flights for various companies including the British Royal Mail from the following year. From March 1987, Gill began leasing Shorts 330 equipment from Fairflight Charters to service a growing network of freight and Royal Mail Datapost services linking Newcastle with Liverpool, Manchester and Luton. This culminated in the take-over of all Fairflight’s flying operations in March 1989, preparatory to the opening of scheduled passenger services to Aberdeen, Manchester and Belfast (City) in the following June.

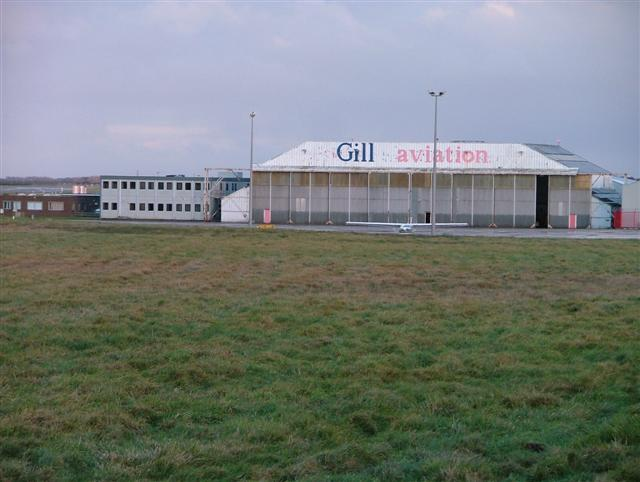
Hangar at Newcastle airport

By 1994, Gill had developed into a substantial domestic airline, with a fleet of 11 Shorts 330 & 360s and a single ATR-42 operating a network which included services from Newcastle and Teesside to Aberdeen, Wick, Belfast, Manchester, London-Gatwick and the Channel Islands. A management change came about in February 1995 when a new team took over the ownership under the title New Aviation Holdings. At this point the name was changed to Gill Airways to reflect expanding scheduled operations.

At the start of 1998, 38,000 passengers a month were being carried, boosted by the recently concluded Air France franchise agreement to operate schedules between Newcastle upon Tyne and Paris-Charles de Gaulle, the first service being flown by ATR 42 on 29 October 1997. This operation was upgraded to jet equipment in the following year with the acquisition of three Fokker 100s and further developed to cover AF flights from Paris to Gothenburg and Helsinki. Code-share flights were also instituted with Eurowings to Düsseldorf, Muk Air to Copehagen and Air Kilroe between Teesside, Manchester and Galway.

When Euroscot failed in July 1999, Gill took over the operation completely, increasing frequencies in the process. However, this venture was to prove something of a weakness in an otherwise essentially sound enterprise. The associated running costs set against the seasonal nature of traffic were cited as a major factor in forcing the airline into financial administration in February 2000. A new management team set about streamlining the operation over successive months: reducing the fleet to 12 aircraft, trimming staff by 250 and eliminating some lesser Royal Mail contracts and minor routes to concentrate on AF franchise operations and the more viable east-coast sectors serving the oil industry.

After emerging from administration on 24 January 2001, the airline seemed to have a promising future ahead of it. Unfortunately Gill Airways became the first of a number of air transport casualties of the far-reaching events of September 11, 2001 attacks. Faced with a massive 35% up-front hike in its insurance premium, the air carrier was forced into receivership and ceased all operations on 20 September 2001, after Bank of Scotland suddenly withdrew support. The airline was placed into liquidation at the loss of 240 jobs.

== Fleet ==
Gill Airways operated the following types of aircraft:

- 7 x ATR 42
- 4 x ATR 72
- 3 x Fokker 100
- 16 x Shorts 330
- 12 x Shorts 360

== Gallery ==
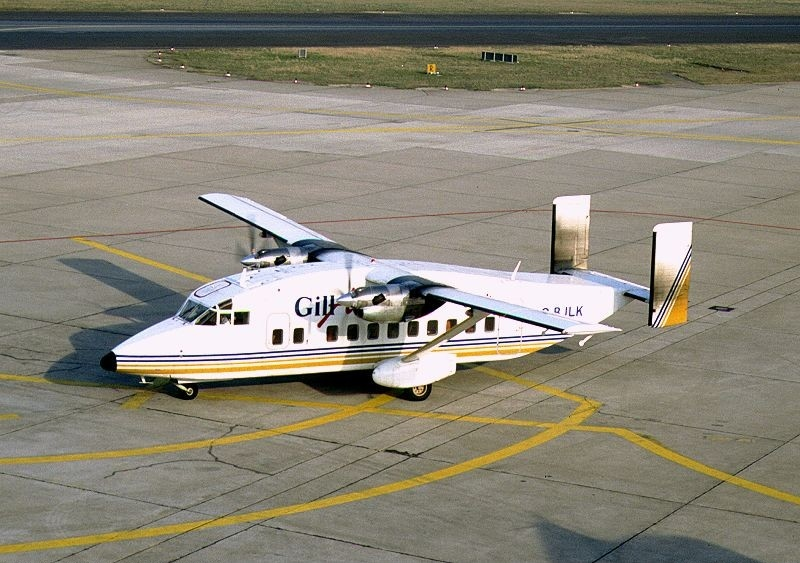
Shorts 330

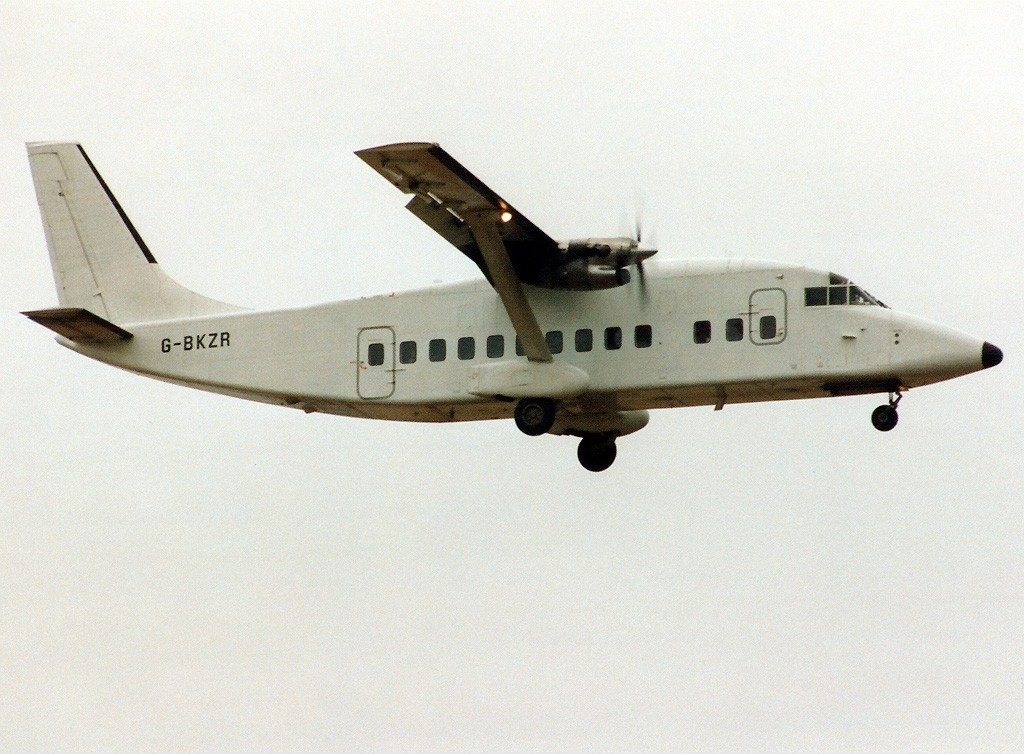
Shorts 360

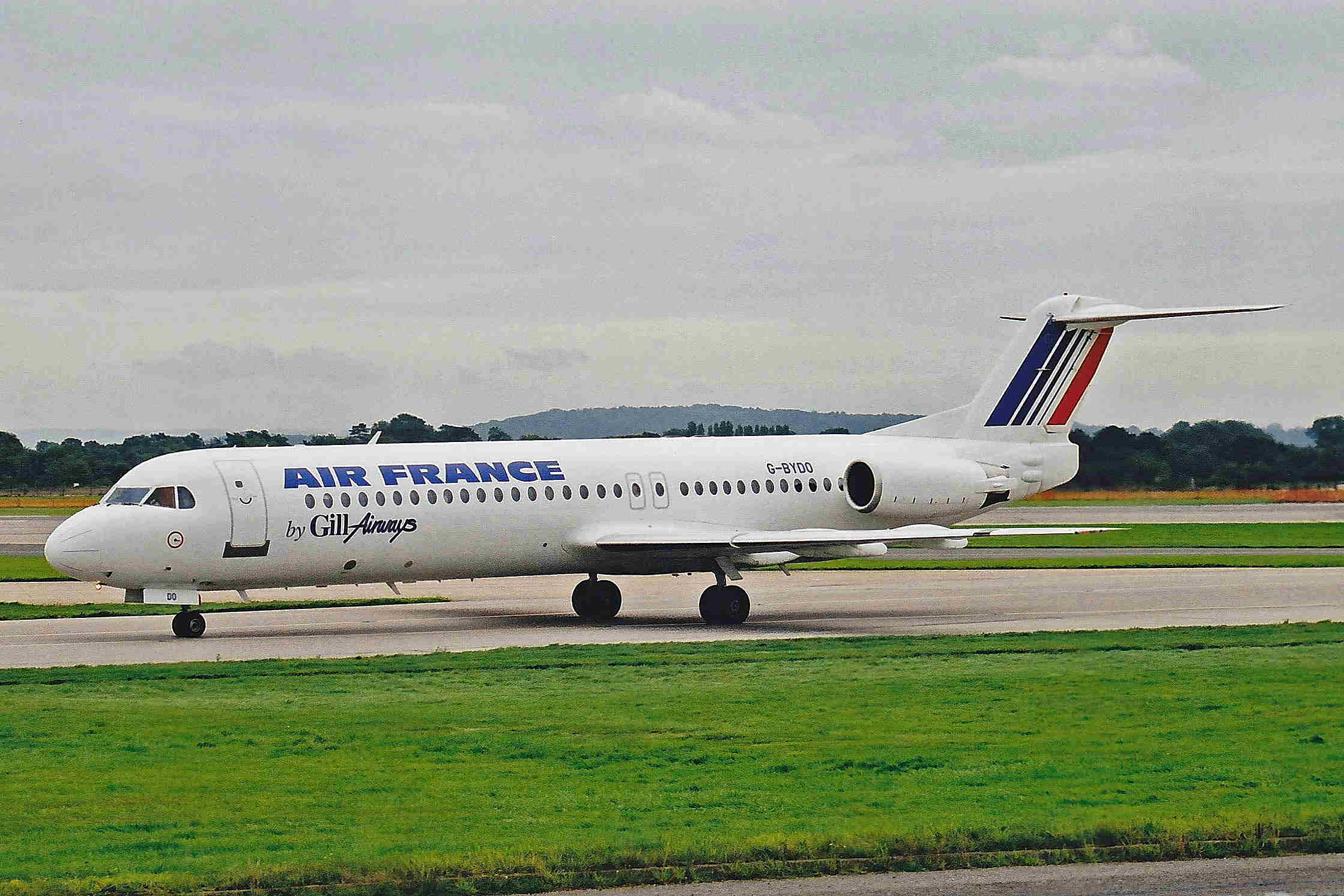
Fokker 100 operated on Air France behalf in September 2000

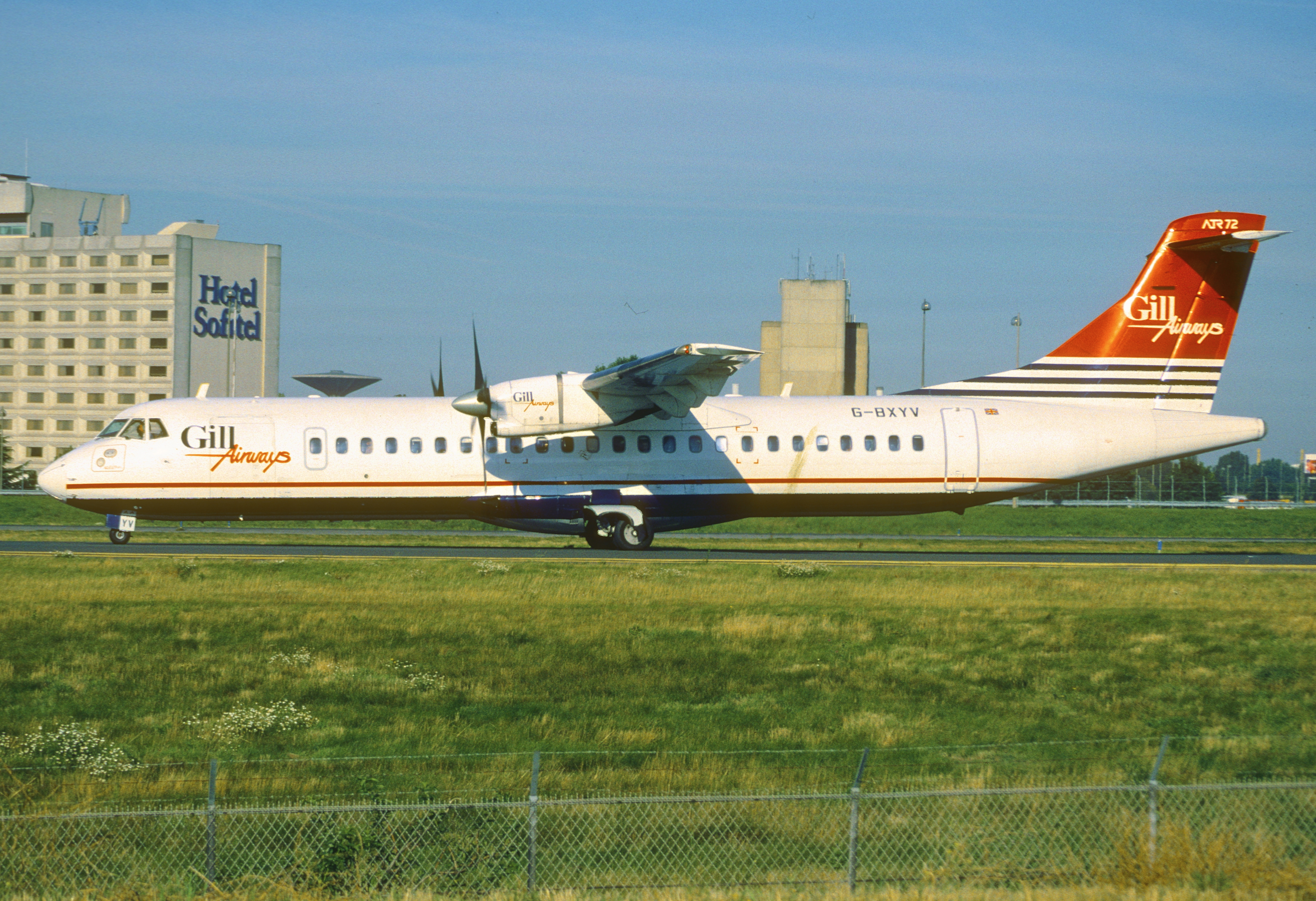
ATR 72 in 2001

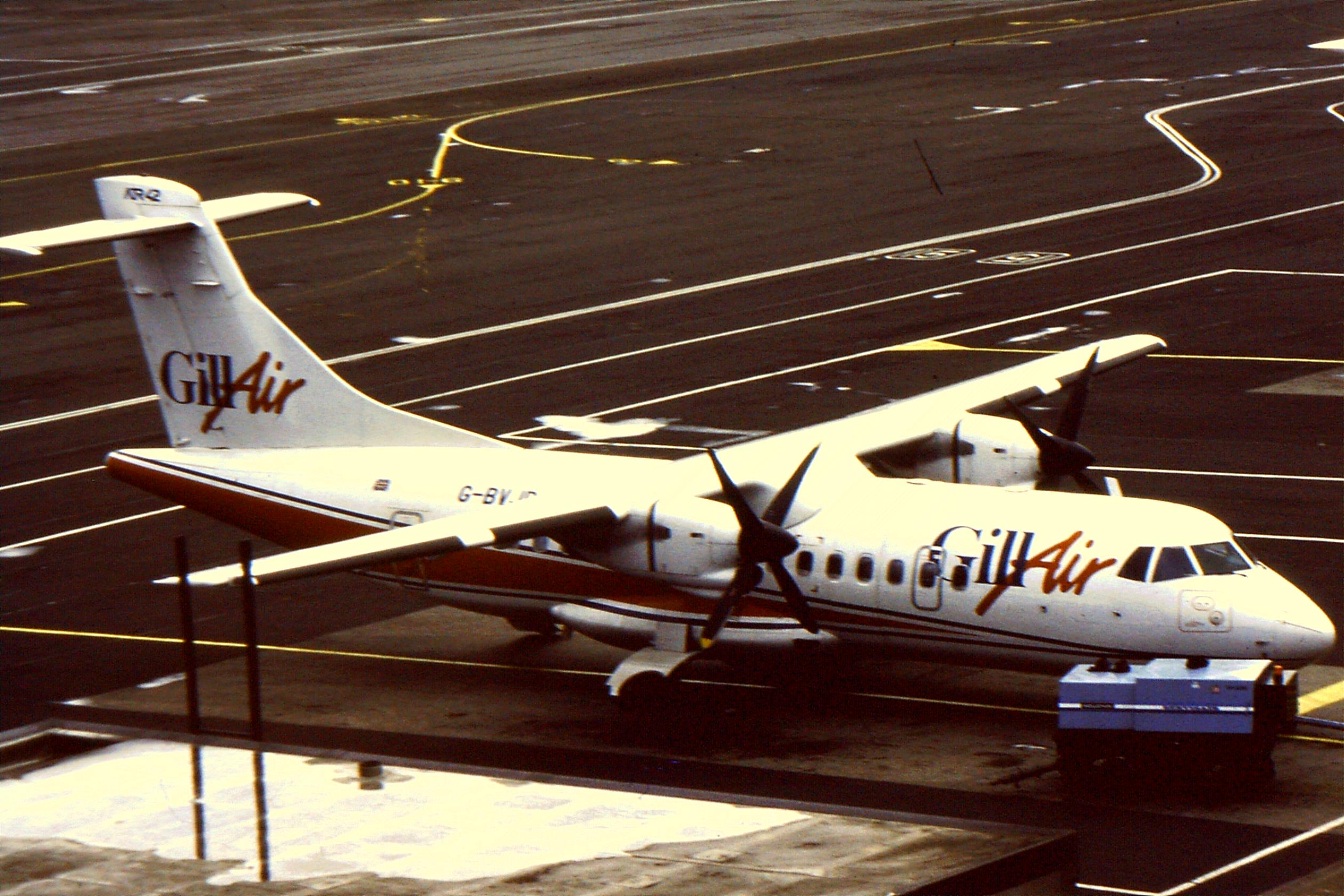
ATR 42

== Aircraft on display ==
- Shorts 330 registered G-OGIL preserved in its original colours can be seen at the North East Aircraft Museum, Sunderland, Tyne & Wear.

== See also ==
- List of defunct airlines of the United Kingdom
