= Express Airways =

Slovenian charter airline

IATA	ICAO	Call sign
—	EPR	EMPEROR
- Founded: 1999
- Ceased operations: 2016
- Operating bases: Maribor Airport
- Fleet size: 1
- Destinations: 3
- Headquarters: Maribor, Slovenia
- Key people: Kaan Tuncer, CEO
- Website: express-airways.com

Express Airways d.o.o. was a Slovenian airline headquartered in Maribor and based at Maribor Airport with a German branch, Express Airways GmbH, located in Düsseldorf. It mainly operated seasonal leisure flights from Germany to Croatia, Spain and Italy.

== History ==
Express Airways was founded in 1999, operating Fokker F27 Friendship, Short 360 and Airbus A300 aircraft configured as freighters on behalf of FedEx. In 2012, Express Airways also founded a flight training school in Slovenia. Since then, the airline has also offered passenger flights. Panoramic flights over Slovenia are also available.

In March 2016, the Slovenian aviation authority revoked the airline's operations license.

== Destinations ==
As of March 2016, Express Airways served the following airports:

Croatia

- Split - Split Airport seasonal

Germany

- Düsseldorf - Düsseldorf Airport seasonal

Slovenia

- Maribor - Maribor Edvard Rusjan Airport seasonal

As of January 2016, Express Airways had announced several more routes between Germany, Spain and Croatia, which however where cancelled in the meantime.

== Fleet ==
The Express Airways fleet consisted of the following aircraft as of August 2016:

Express Airways fleet
Aircraft	In service	Orders	Passengers	Notes
Boeing 737-300	1	—		
Tecnam P2006T	1	—		For flight training
Total	2			
