= Air Cargo Carriers Flight 1260 =

2017 aviation accident in the United States

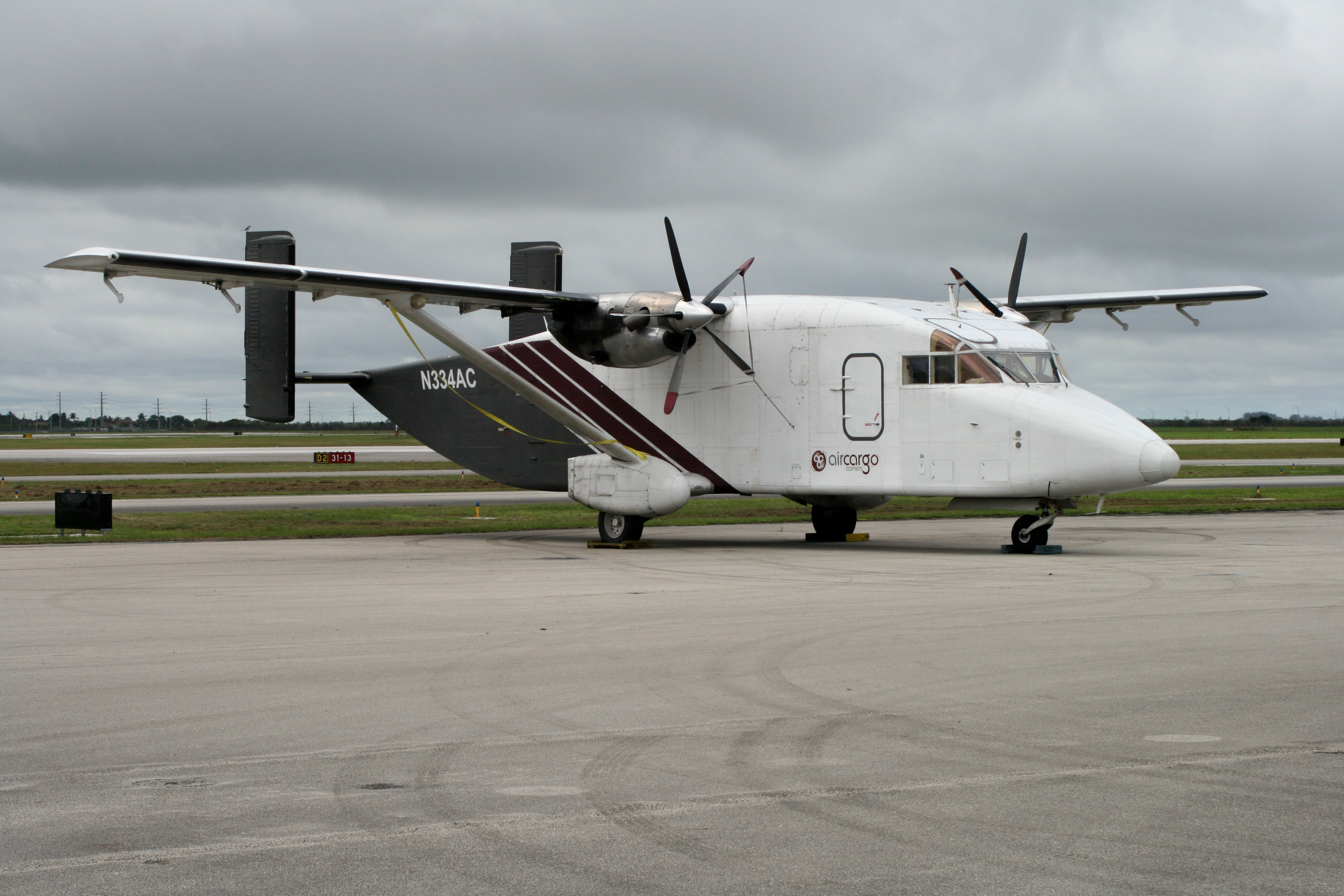
- N334AC, the aircraft involved in the accident, pictured in 2013

Accident
- Date: May 5, 2017
- Summary: Excessive descent rate caused by pilot error, leading to controlled flight into terrain
- Site: Yeager Airport, Charleston, West Virginia, U.S; 38°22′24.4″N 81°35′54.6″W

Aircraft
- Aircraft type: Short 330-200
- Operator: Air Cargo Carriers, on behalf of UPS Airlines
- IATA flight No.: 2Q1260
- ICAO flight No.: SNC1260
- Call sign: NIGHT CARGO 1260
- Registration: N334AC
- Flight origin: Louisville Muhammad Ali International Airport, Louisville, Kentucky, United States
- Destination: Yeager Airport, Charleston, West Virginia, United States
- Occupants: 2
- Passengers: 0
- Crew: 2
- Fatalities: 2
- Survivors: 0

On May 5, 2017, at around 6:55 AM ET, Air Cargo Carriers Flight 1260, a scheduled domestic feeder cargo flight operated on behalf of UPS using a Short 330-200 aircraft, crashed on landing at Yeager Airport, Charleston, West Virginia. The accident occurred after a flight from Louisville International Airport, Kentucky. Both pilots, the sole occupants on board, were killed in the crash.

== Background ==
=== Aircraft ===
The aircraft involved was a Short 330-200, registered as N334AC. The aircraft was manufactured in 1979 and was first delivered to Loganair, it was then acquired by Air Cargo Carriers in 1998. On this occasion, it was operating a feeder cargo flight by Air Cargo Carriers on behalf of UPS.

=== Crew ===
- The captain was 47-year-old Jonathan Alvarado. He was hired by Air Cargo Carriers in July 2015, and had a little over 4,300 total flight hours, of which 1,094 on the Short 330.
- The first officer was 33-year-old Anh Ho. She began working with the airline in 2016, and had a total of 652 flight hours of which 333 were in the Short 330.

Both crew members were from Charleston, West Virginia.

== Accident ==
The Short 330 landed short of the runway, then bounced and crashed into trees. A post-impact fire broke out. Both pilots were killed and the aircraft was completely destroyed.

== Investigation ==
The final report stated that the accident was caused by pilot error, since the crew initiated a descent that went against standard operation procedures.
