= Short 330 =

British transport aircraft

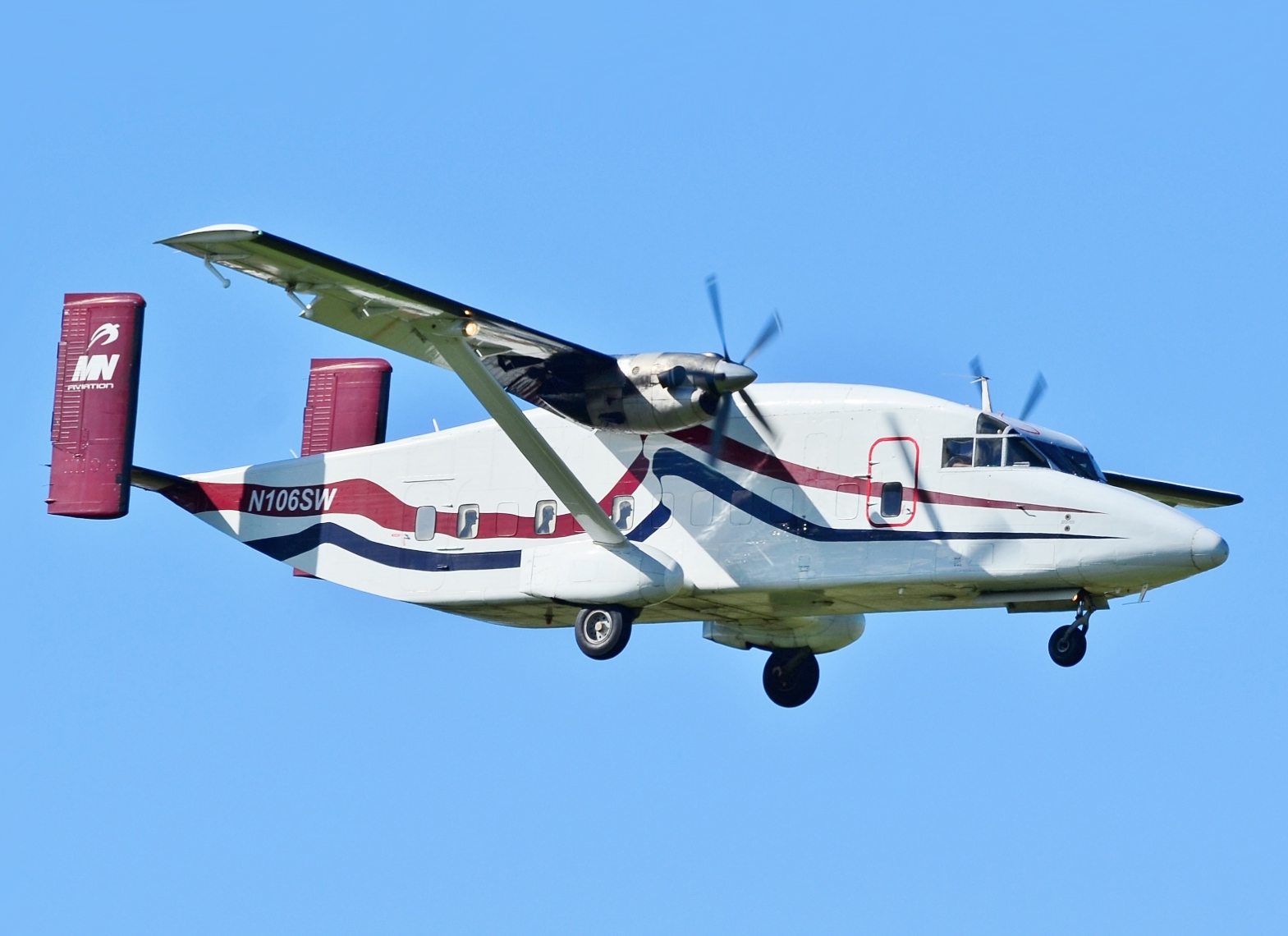
- A Short 330 of MN Aviation landing at Luis Muñoz Marín International, Puerto Rico

General information
- Type: Transport aircraft
- National origin: United Kingdom
- Manufacturer: Short Brothers
- Status: In limited cargo service
- Primary users: Air Cargo Carriers Corporate Air
- Number built: 330-100: 68; 330-200: 73

History
- Manufactured: 1974–1992
- Introduction date: 1976
- First flight: 22 August 1974
- Developed from: Short Skyvan
- Variant: C-23A Sherpa
- Developed into: Short 360

The Short 330 (also SD3-30) is a turboprop transport aircraft produced by Short Brothers. It seats up to 30 people and was relatively inexpensive and had low maintenance costs at the time of its introduction in 1976. The 330 was based on the SC.7 Skyvan. The C-23 Sherpa was a military version of the 330. Production of the aircraft ended in 1992, after 141 were produced. The Short 360 was a development of the Short 330.

In 2019 De Havilland Canada acquired rights to restart production of the Shorts 330 (3-60 and C-23 B+).

== Development ==
The Short 330 was developed by Short Brothers of Belfast from Short's earlier Short Skyvan STOL utility transport. The 330 had a longer wingspan and fuselage than the Skyvan, while retaining the Skyvan's square-shaped fuselage cross section, allowing it to carry up to 30 passengers while retaining good short field characteristics. The first prototype of the 330 flew on 22 August 1974.

The Short 330 is unusual in having all of its fuel contained in tanks located directly above the ceiling of the passenger cabin. There are two separate cockpit doors for pilot and co-pilot for access from inside the cabin.

While Short concentrated on producing airliners, the design also spawned two freight versions. The first of these, the Short 330-UTT (standing for Utility Tactical Transport), was a military transport version fitted with a strengthened cabin floor and paratroop doors, which was sold in small numbers, primarily to Thailand, which purchased four. The Short Sherpa was a freighter fitted with a full-width rear cargo door/ramp. This version first flew on 23 December 1982, with the first order, for 18 aircraft, being placed by the United States Air Force (USAF) in March 1983, for the European Distribution System Aircraft (EDSA) role, to fly spare parts between USAF bases within Europe. Subsequently, a further 16 were ordered as C-23B Sherpas.

== Operational history ==
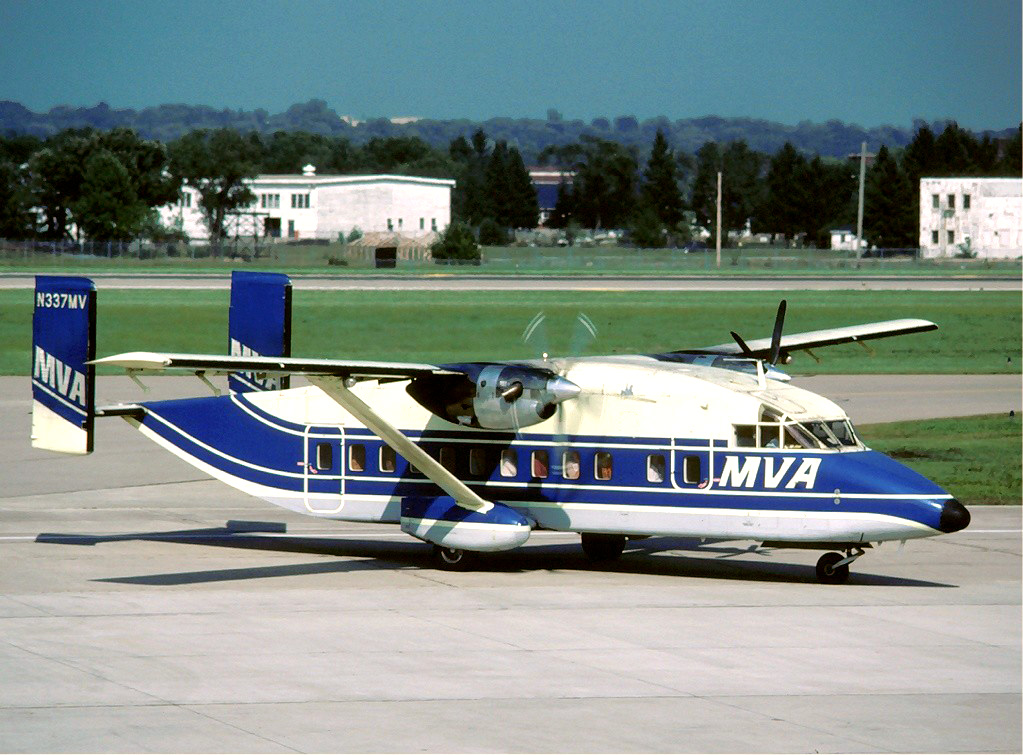
Mississippi Valley Airlines's Short 330 at Saint Paul International Airport in 1985

The basic Short 330 was a passenger aircraft intended as a short-range regional and commuter airliner, and had been designed to take advantage of US regulations which allowed commuter airlines to use aircraft carrying up to 30 passengers, thereby replacing smaller types such as the Beechcraft Model 99 and the de Havilland Canada DHC-6 Twin Otter. The Short 330 entered service with Time Air (a Canadian airline) in 1976. Despite its somewhat portly looks (one regional airline affectionately dubbed it the "Shed"), it soon proved to be an inexpensive and reliable 30-seat airliner.

The 330 was somewhat slower than most of its pressurised competition, but it built up a reputation as a comfortable, quiet and rugged airliner. The quiet running of the Pratt & Whitney PT6A-45R was largely due to an efficient reduction gearbox. The cabin was the result of a collaboration with Boeing engineers who modelled the interior space, fittings and decor after larger airliners. The use of a sturdy structure complete with the traditional Short braced-wing-and-boxy-fuselage configuration also led to an ease of maintenance and serviceability.

Production ended in 1992 with a total of 141 being built (including freighter and military versions). As of 1998, approximately 35 were still in service. The 330's design was refined and heavily modified, resulting in the Short 360.

== Variants ==
- 330-100 was the original production model with Pratt & Whitney Canada PT6A-45A and -45B turboprop engines.
- 330-200 included minor improvements and more powerful PT6A-45R engine.
- 330-UTT was the Utility Tactical Transport version of the 330-200, with a strengthened cabin floor and inward-opening paratroop doors.
- Sherpa was a freighter version of the 330-200 with a full-width rear cargo ramp.
- C-23 Sherpa A, and B variants are military configured Short Sherpas. (NB The C-23B+ is a conversion of 28 Short 360 airframes.)

== Operators ==
=== Civilian ===
The aircraft is popular with air charters, small feeder airlines, and air freight companies.

Australia

- Sunstate Airlines

British Virgin Islands

- Atlantic Air BVI

Canada

- Air Labrador

Greece

- Olympic Aviation

Guam

- Freedom Air

Indonesia

- Deraya Air Taxi

Thailand

- Bangkok Airways
- Thai Airways Company
- Thai Airways International

United Kingdom

- BAC Express Airlines
- British Air Ferries
- Brymon Airways
- Emerald Airways
- Gill Airways
- Titan Airways

United States

- Air Cargo Carriers
- Airways International
- Command Airways
- Corporate Air
- Crown Airways
- Skyway Enterprises

Venezuela

- Aeronaves del Centro

=== Military ===
United States

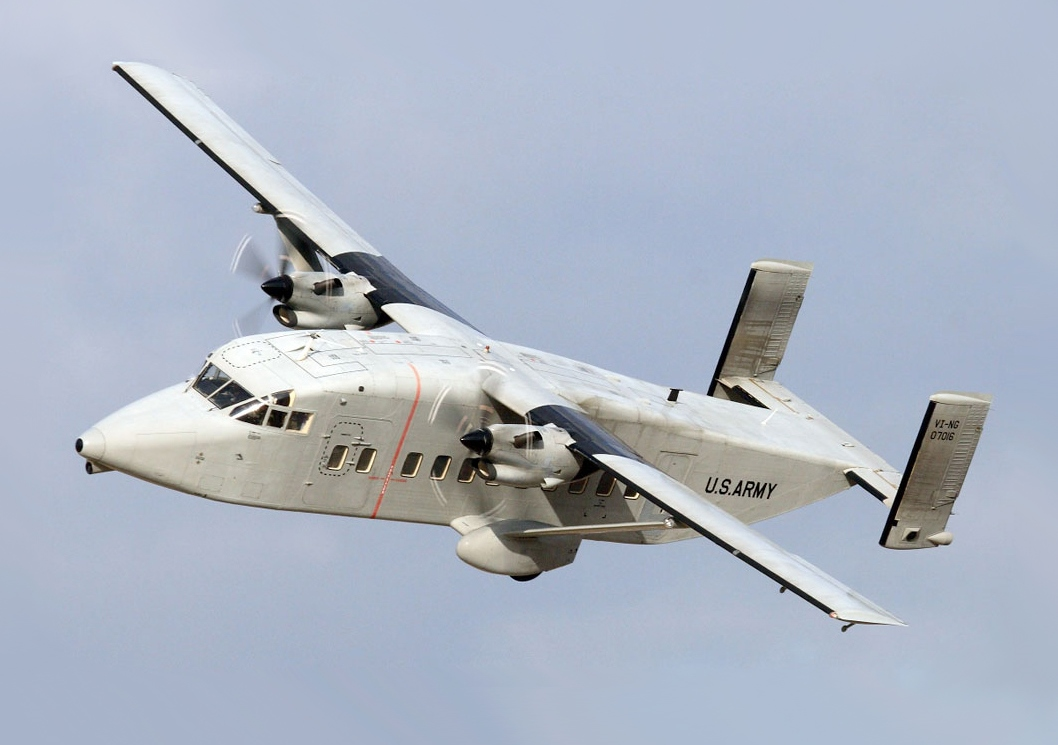
The US Army C-23 is a variant of the 330 model

- United States Air Force (C-23)
- United States Army (C-23)

Philippines

- Philippine Army (SD3-30)

=== Former ===
Tanzania

- Tanzanian Air Force

Thailand

- Royal Thai Army
- Royal Thai Police

United Arab Emirates

- United Arab Emirates Air Force

Venezuela

- Venezuelan Air Force

== Accidents and incidents ==
As of May 2017, the aircraft type has suffered three fatal accidents in civilian use:

- 3 August 1989. An Olympic Aviation Short 330, operating as Olympic Aviation Flight 545, crashed on a hillside in Samos island, Greece, while attempting a landing approach in thick fog. All 3 crew members and 31 passengers were killed.
- 25 May 2000. A Streamline Aviation Short 330 operating as Streamline Aviation Flight 200 was hit by a departing MD-83 operating as Air Liberté Flight 8807 when it entered an active runway at Paris-Charles de Gaulle Airport. The wingtip of the departing plane slashed through the Short's cockpit and killed one of its pilots.
- 5 May 2017. A Short 330 cargo plane owned by Air Cargo Carriers and operated as Air Cargo Carriers Flight 1260 crashed after suffering a hard landing at Yeager Airport in Charleston, West Virginia. Early reports stated that the left wing made contact with the surface of the runway and separated from the fuselage, causing the aircraft to cartwheel off the runway and down a heavily wooded hillside. Both pilots died in the crash.

In addition to these three accidents, there have been at least sixteen hull-loss occurrences, i.e., non-fatal accidents in which planes were damaged beyond repair.

== Aircraft on display ==
G-BDBS msn SH3001, the production prototype, is on display within the Ulster Aviation Society's Heritage Collection of Shorts aircraft at the former RAF Long Kesh in Lisburn, Northern Ireland.

G-OGIL msn SH3068 is on display at the North East Land, Sea and Air Museum in Sunderland, United Kingdom.

== Specifications (330-200) ==
Data from Jane's All the World's Aircraft, 1988–1989

General characteristics

- Crew: Three (two pilots plus one cabin crew)
- Length: 17.69 m (58 ft 0 in)
- Wingspan: 22.76 m (74 ft 8 in)
- Height: 4.95 m (16 ft 3 in)
- Wing area: 42.1 m^{2} (453 sq ft)
- Airfoil: NACA 63A series (modified)
- Empty weight: 6,680 kg (14,727 lb)
- Max takeoff weight: 10,387 kg (22,899 lb)
- Fuel capacity: 2,546 L (560 imp gal; 673 US gal)
- Powerplant: 2 × Pratt & Whitney Canada PT6A-45-R turboprop, 893 kW (1,198 shp) each
- Propellers: 5-bladed Hartzell constant-speed

Performance

- Maximum speed: 350 km/h (220 mph, 190 kn) (max cruise at 3,000 m (10,000 ft))
- Cruise speed: 300 km/h (180 mph, 160 kn) (econ cruise at 3,000 m (10,000 ft))
- Stall speed: 135 km/h (84 mph, 73 kn) (landing gear and flaps down)
- Range: 1,695 km (1,053 mi, 915 nmi) (no reserves, passenger version, 1,966 kg (4,334 lb) payload)
- Service ceiling: 6,100 m (20,000 ft)
- Rate of climb: 6.0 m/s (1,180 ft/min)

== See also ==
Related development

- Short 360
- Short C-23 Sherpa
- Short SC.7 Skyvan

Aircraft of comparable role, configuration, and era

- Chase YC-122 Avitruc

Related lists

- List of civil aircraft
