= Freedom Air (Guam) =

Airline of Guam (1974–2013)

Freedom Air (Aviation Services, Ltd.)
IATA	ICAO	Call sign
FP	FRE	FREEDOM
- Founded: 1974
- Ceased operations: 2013
- Hubs: Guam; Saipan
- Headquarters: Barrigada, Guam
- Key people: Joaquin Flores (General Manager, Owner)
- Website: www.freedomairguam.com

Freedom Air was an airline based in Barrigada, Guam, operated scheduled passenger and cargo services in Guam and the Northern Mariana Islands. Its headquarters is located in Guam's Antonio B. Won Pat International Airport.

The airline operated scheduled FAR part 121 passenger service between Guam, Rota and Saipan using a 30-seat Shorts 360 aircraft. Part 135 operations serve the Saipan-Tinian route using Piper Cherokee aircraft. It also operated cargo services using a Shorts 330 cargo conversion aircraft.

== Destinations ==
=== Guam (United States) ===
- Guam – Antonio B. Won Pat International Airport (Main Hub)

=== Northern Mariana Islands (United States) ===
- Rota – Rota International Airport
- Saipan – Saipan International Airport (Hub)
- Tinian – Tinian International Airport

== Fleet ==
The Freedom Air fleet includes the following aircraft (at March 2007):

- 1 Shorts 330-200 Sherpa Cargo configuration
- 1 Shorts 360-300 (30 Seat passenger configuration)

As of August 2006, the airline also operated:

- Piper PA-31 Navajo (7 Seat passenger configuration)
- Piper PA-23 Aztec (6 Seat passenger configuration)
- Piper PA-28 Cherokee (6 Seat passenger configuration)
- Cessna 172 Skyhawk (3 Seat passenger configuration)

== See also ==
- Pacific Island Aviation (Another defunct airline of this region, operated from 1988 to 2005)
