= Air Cargo Carriers =

Cargo airline of the United States

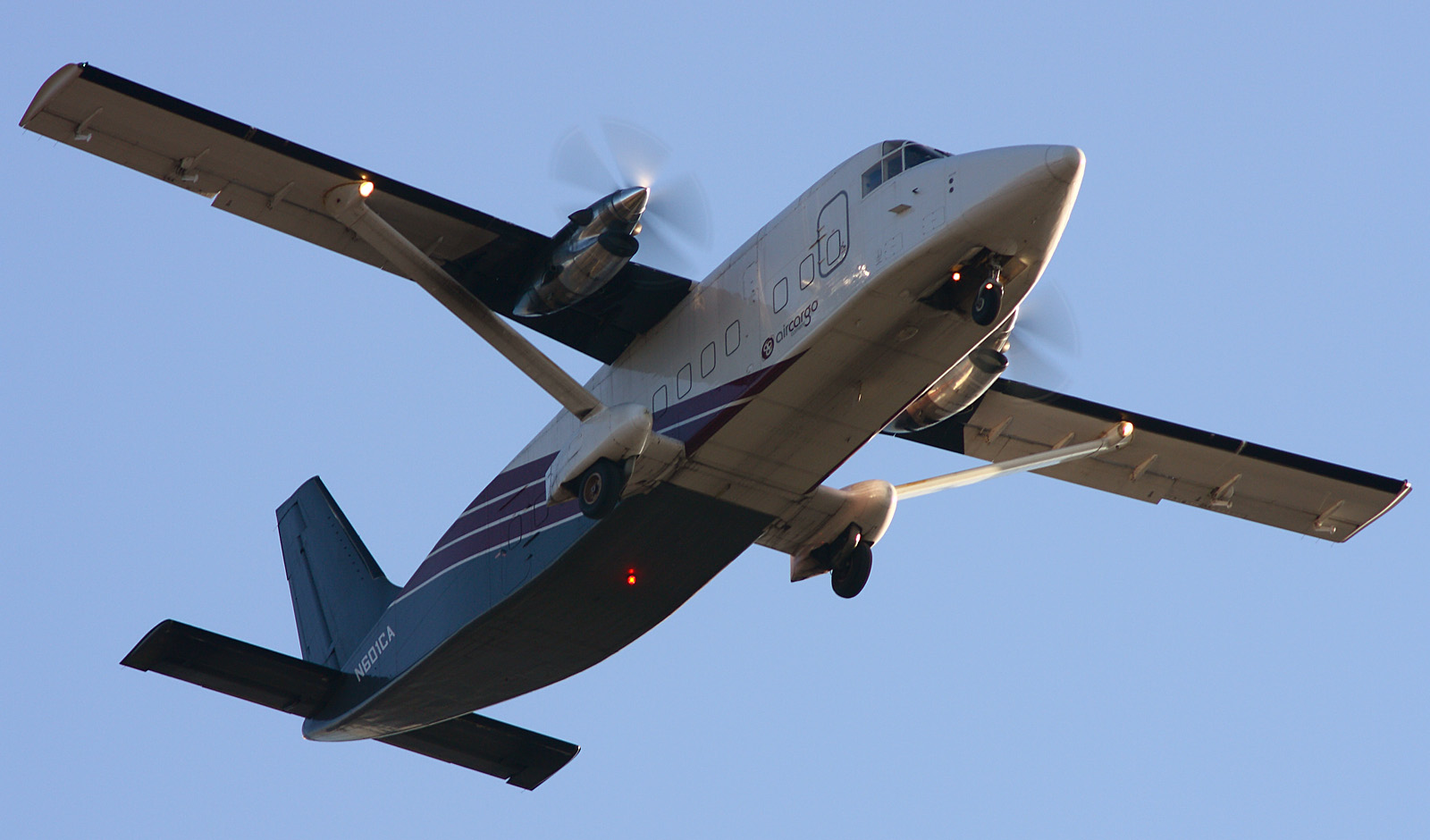
IATA	ICAO	Call sign
2Q	SNC	NIGHT CARGO
- Founded: 1986
- Hubs: Milwaukee Mitchell International Airport - Milwaukee, Wisconsin, United States; Luis Muñoz Marín International Airport - San Juan, Puerto Rico, United States
- Fleet size: 29
- Headquarters: Milwaukee, Wisconsin, United States
- Website: www.aircargocarriers.com

Air Cargo Carriers is a cargo airline based in Milwaukee, Wisconsin, United States. ACC was established in 1986 and operates contract feeder cargo services for UPS, FedEx and DHL, additionally providing on demand charter service. Air Cargo Carriers, Inc. is the largest civilian operator of Short aircraft in the world. Its main base of operations is Milwaukee Mitchell International Airport, in Milwaukee.

== Routes ==
Air Cargo Carriers operates throughout the US, Canada, and the Caribbean. The scheduled routes include:

- Beckley, WV (BKW) to Louisville, KY (SDF)
- Charleston, WV (CRW) to Louisville, KY (SDF)
- Warsaw, IN (ASW) to Louisville, KY (SDF)
- Danville, IL (DNV) to Louisville, KY (SDF) to Decatur, IL (DEC)
- Myrtle Beach, SC (MYR) to Columbia, SC (CAE)
- Milwaukee, WI (MKE) to Madison, WI (MSN) to Louisville, KY (SDF) to Traverse City, MI (TVC)
- Warsaw, IN (ASW) to Louisville, KY (SDF) to Ft. Wayne, IN (FWA)
- Beckley, WV (BKW) to Louisville, KY (SDF) to Charleston, WV (CRW)
- Charleston, WV (CRW) to Louisville, KY (SDF) to Roanoke, VA (ROA)
- San Juan, PR (SJU) to St. Thomas, US Virgin Islands (STT)
- San Juan, PR (SJU) to St. Croix, US Virgin Islands (STX)
- San Juan, PR (SJU) to St. Martin, AN (SXM)
- San Juan, PR (SJU) to Tortola, British Virgin Islands (EIS)
- San Juan, PR (SJU) to Santo Domingo, Dominican Republic (SDQ)
- Aguadilla, PR (BQN) to Santiago, Dominican Republic (STI)

== History ==
A brief history:

- In 1986, Air Cargo Carriers began flying 3,500 lb. capacity Shorts Skyvan aircraft, and grew to a fleet of five planes.
- In 1990, Shorts SD-30 aircraft were added to the Air Cargo Carriers' fleet.
- By 1994, the company had 11 total aircraft in its fleet. In 1995, Short 360s were acquired by the company.
- In 1994 the avionics and instrument division of Air Cargo Carriers, Milwaukee Avionics & Instruments, was formed.
- In 2001, ACC began operating in the Caribbean, and by 2003 had 21 aircraft in its fleet.
- The company also has the largest Shorts parts inventories in the world.
- ACC operates a full-service maintenance base with two hangars at Milwaukee Mitchell International Airport in Milwaukee. The company also operates a satellite maintenance facility in Punta Gorda, Florida.

== Fleet ==
The Air Cargo Carriers fleet includes the following aircraft (as of June 2019):

Aircraft	Quantity in fleet
Short 360	25
Short 330	1
Cessna 208 Caravan	3

== Incidents ==
- 5 February 2006: Two Short 360-300 freighters, modded for a DOD contract, operated by Air Cargo Carriers, were flying in formation when they collided near Watertown, Wisconsin, US. N3735W attempted to maneuver below N372AC in a right turn and struck the left/ underside of N372AC. The left wing outer section of N3735W was struck and separated by the leading edge of N372AC's left wing, and the aircraft crashed, killing all three occupants. The left propeller of N3735W had struck the forward section of the left "stub wing" of N372AC (the structure housing the left main landing gear and hydraulic service panel). N372AC sustained severe damage, including structural, engine, propeller (losing several blades), aerodynamic, and complete hydraulic failure (affecting flaps, landing gear, nose wheel steering, and primary brakes). The crew managed to make an emergency landing at Dodge County Airport in Juneau, WI (KUNU), but overran the runway due to the damage to the aircraft. The left aileron of N3735W was found on the runway that N372AC landed on. Both crewmen survived uninjured, but N372AC was damaged beyond reasonable repair.
- 17 May 2012: An Air Cargo Carriers Short 360 (registration N617FB) was substantially damaged following a wheel brake fire during taxi at the George Bush Intercontinental Airport, Houston, Texas. There were no injuries to the flight crew of two. The airplane was 60 pounds over Max. takeoff weight and during the long taxi to position for takeoff the crew used a higher than normal power setting and rode the brakes in an attempt to lower weight by burning fuel. Its intended destination was Austin, Texas.
- May 5, 2017: Air Cargo Carriers Flight 1260, a Short Brothers 330 aircraft working as a feeder for the United Parcel Service suffered a wing strike and crashed while attempting to land at Yeager airport in Charleston, West Virginia The pilot and the co-pilot were killed.
