= Short 360 =

1981 airliner family

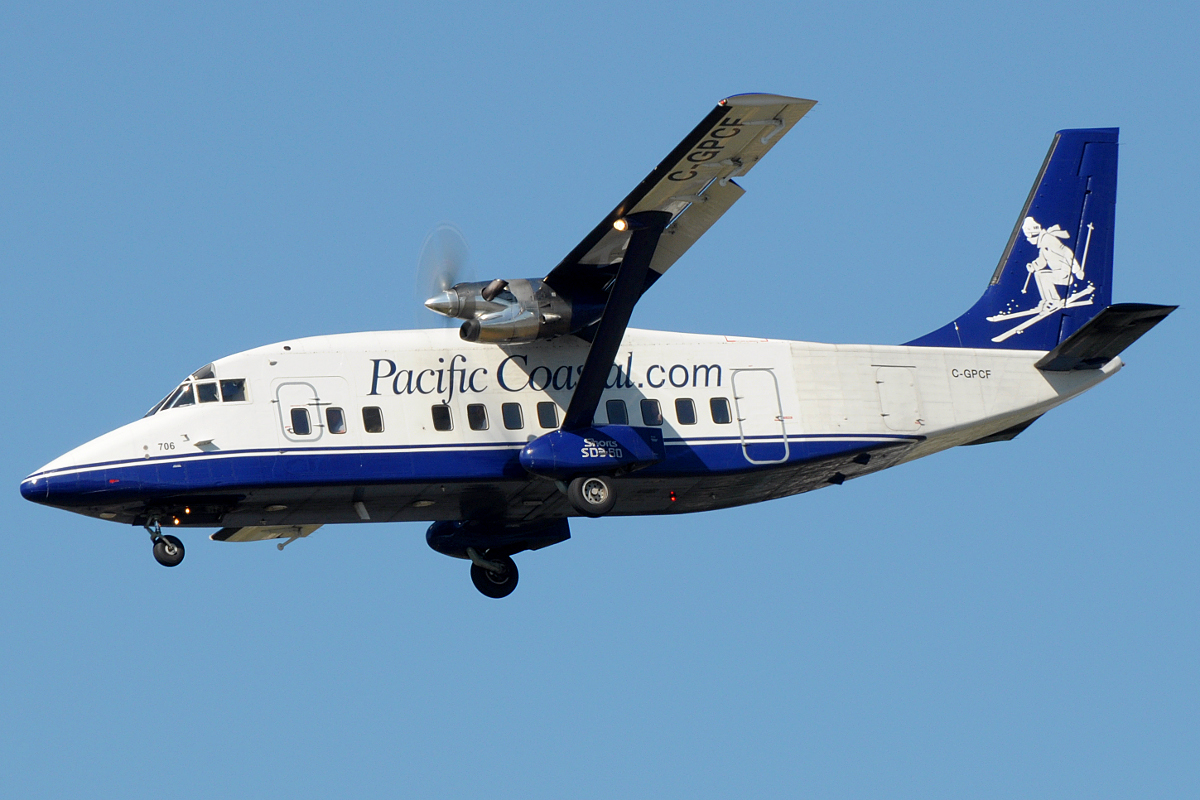
- A Pacific Coastal Airlines Short 360

General information
- Type: Transport aircraft
- National origin: United Kingdom
- Manufacturer: Short Brothers
- Status: In limited service
- Primary users: Air Cargo Carriers TransAir; Skyway Enterprises; Air Flamenco
- Number built: 165

History
- Manufactured: 1981–1991
- Introduction date: November 1982
- First flight: 1 June 1981
- Developed from: Short 330
- Variant: Short C-23B/C Sherpa

The Short 360 (also SD3-60; also Shorts 360) is a commuter aircraft that was built by UK manufacturer Short Brothers during the 1980s. The Short 360 seats up to 39 passengers and was introduced into service in November 1982. It is a larger version of the Short 330.

== Development ==
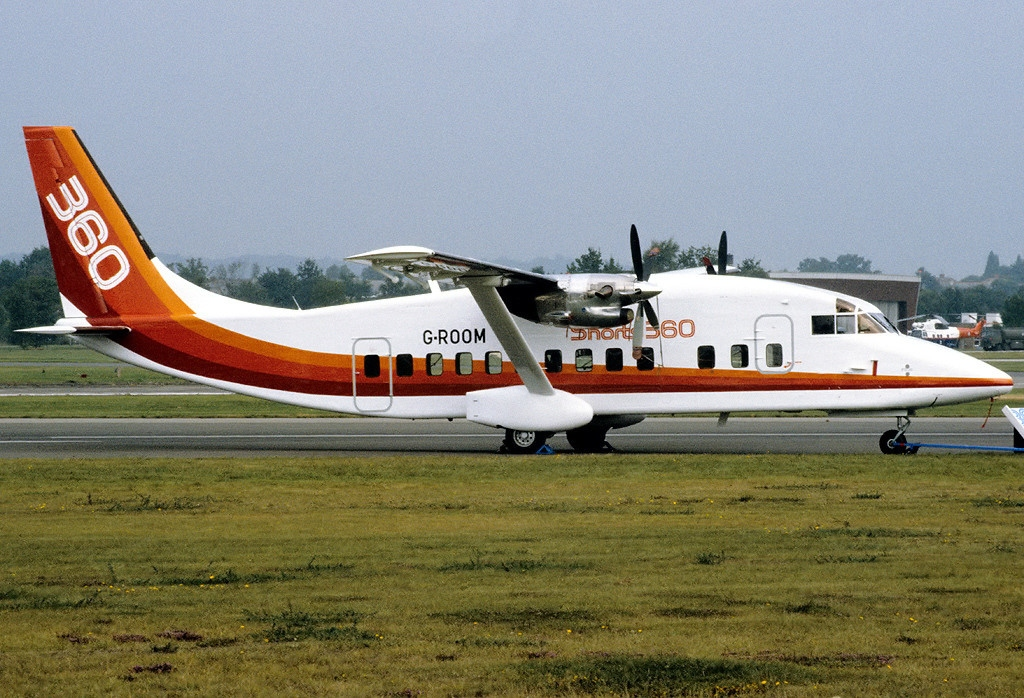
The prototype at the 1982 Farnborough Airshow

During the 1970s, the world's commuter airline market began to evolve from the 20-seat class to larger and more comfortable cabins. Short Brothers of Northern Ireland had created the Skyvan in 1962, followed by the related but larger Short 330 in 1974. The Short 360 development was announced in 1980, with the prototype's first flight on 1 June 1981 and type certification awarded on 3 September 1981.

The first production Short 360 had its maiden flight on 19 August 1982 and entered service with Suburban Airlines (later merged with Allegheny Airlines/US Airways) in November 1982.

After initiating production with the basic model, Short marketed a number of 360 developments. First was the 360 Advanced, in late 1985, with 1,424 shp (1,062 kW) PT6A-65-AR engines. That was followed by the 360/300, in March 1987, with six-blade propellers, more powerful PT6A-67R engines, and aerodynamic improvements, giving a higher cruise speed and improved "hot and high" performance. The 360/300 was also built in 360/300F freighter configuration.

Production of the 360 ceased in 1991 after 165 deliveries.

== Design ==
The Short 360 is a 36-seat derivative of the 30–33 seat Short 330. In high density configuration, 39 passengers could be carried. The two Short airliners have a high degree of commonality and are very close in overall dimensions. The later 360 is easily identified by a larger, swept tail unit mounted on a revised rear fuselage. The 360 has a 3-foot (91 cm) fuselage "plug" which gave sufficient additional length for two more seat rows (six more passengers), while the extra length smoothed out the aerodynamic profile and reduced drag. Seating is arranged with two seats on the starboard side of the cabin and one seat on the port side. The 360's power is supplied by two Pratt & Whitney PT6A-65Rs.

The 360 has a specialised role in regional airline use worldwide, being able to operate from 4,500 feet (1,400 m) runways, which are inaccessible to larger airliners due to length. With a cruise speed of about 215 knots (250 mph; 400 km/h) at an altitude of 10,000 feet (3,000 m), the unpressurized 360 is not the fastest turboprop in its market, but it offers acceptable performance at a reasonable price, and ease of service and maintainability. The PT6A turboprops are fully ICAO Stage 3 noise-compliant, making the 360 one of the quietest turboprop aircraft operating today.

== Variants ==
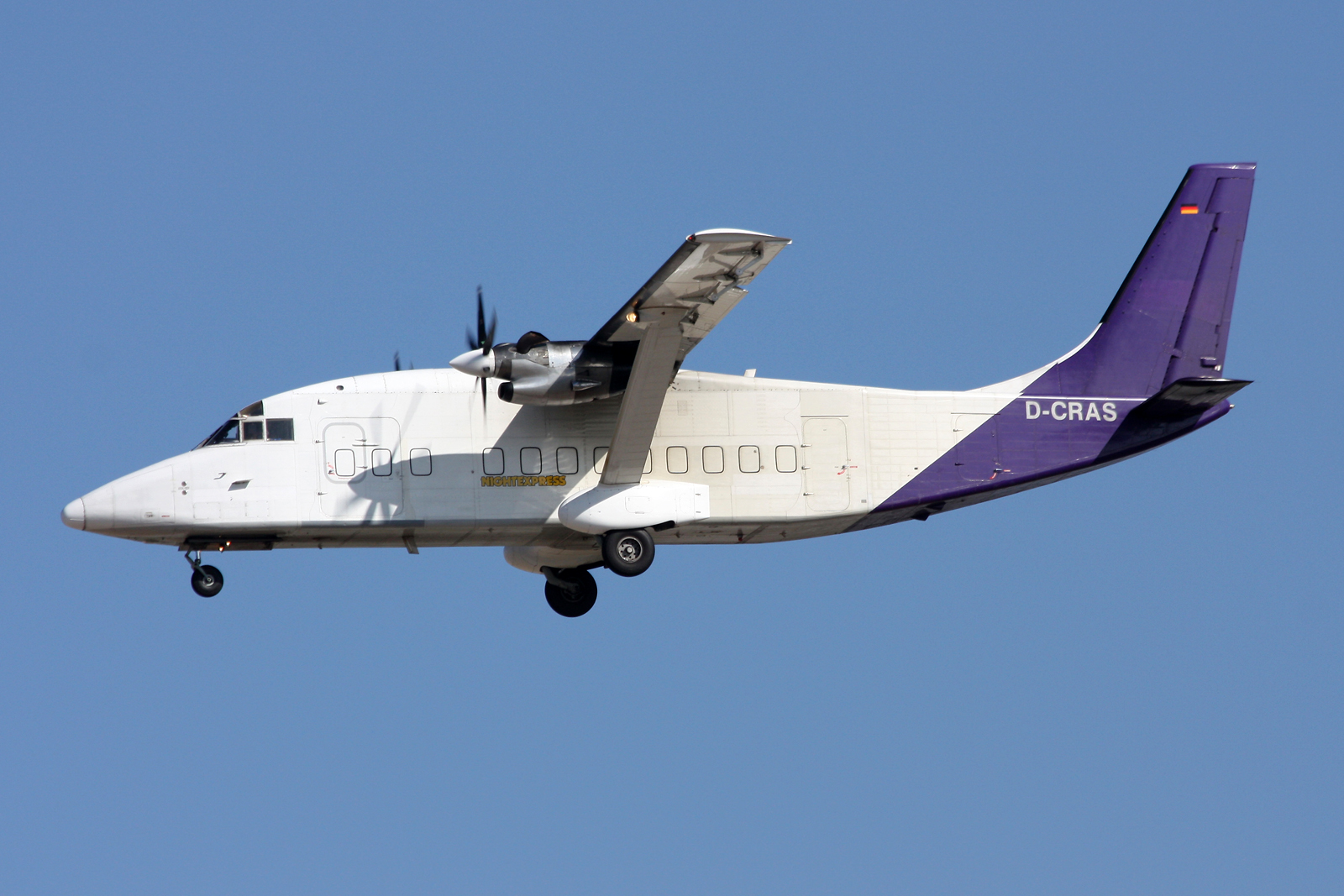
Nightexpress freighter with windows plugged

- 360-100 - the first production model with Pratt & Whitney Canada PT6A-65R turboprop engines.
- 360 Advanced - with PT6A-65AR engines rated at 1,424 shp (1,062 kW) each. The aircraft was later redesignated 360-200. Introduced in late 1985.
- 360-300 - with more powerful PT6A-67R engines with six-blade propellers. Higher cruise speed and improved performance.
- 360-300F - the freighter version of the -300, with capacity for five LD3 cargo containers.
- Short C-23 Sherpa B+ and C variants are military-configured Short 360s operated by the United States military. Twenty-eight C-23B+ were produced by conversions of civilian Short 360 airframes, and the C-23C was a conversion of C-23B and C-23B+.

== Operators ==
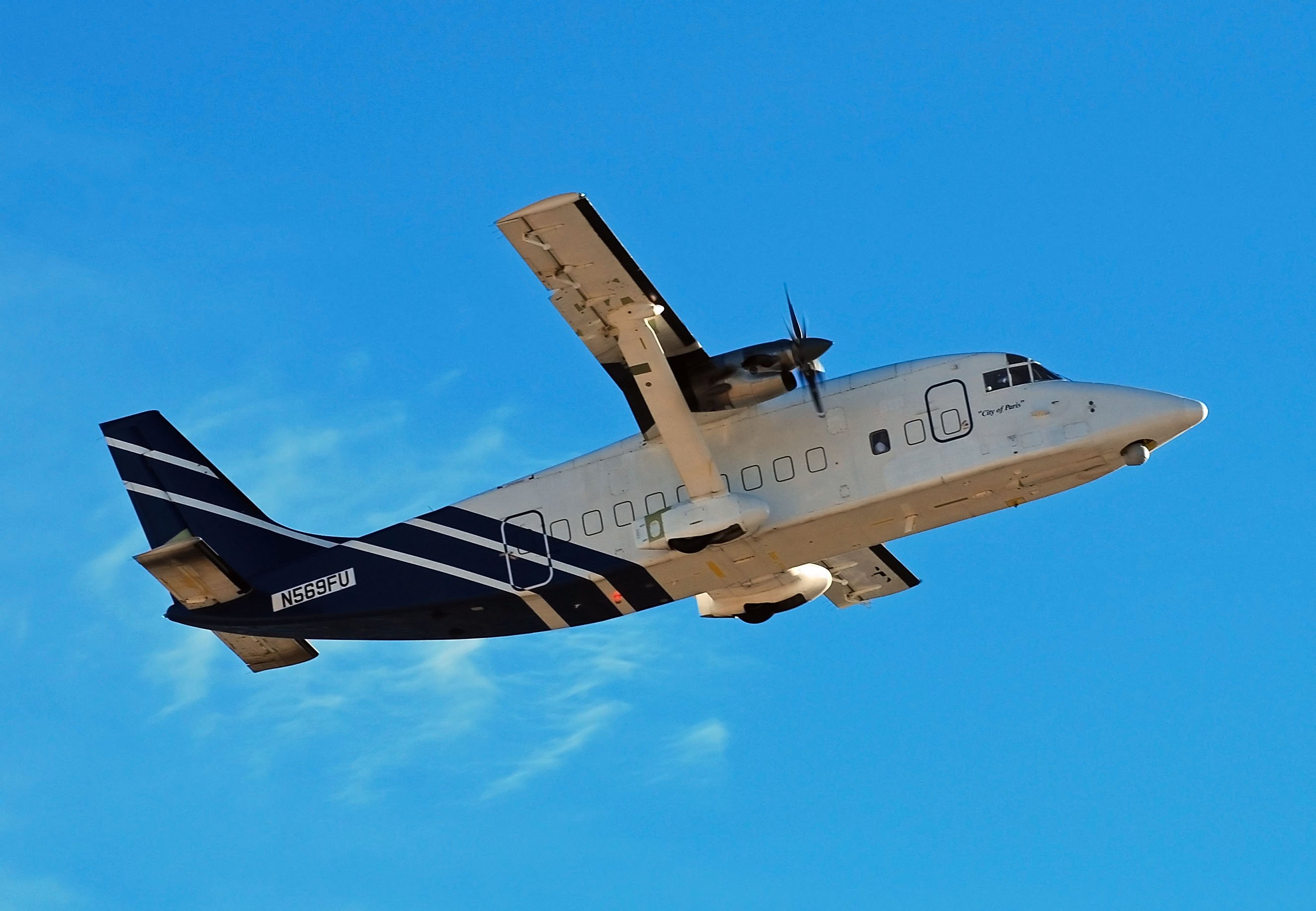
Air Cargo Carriers is the largest operator with 17 aircraft

In 1998, approximately 110 360s were in service. In 2017, there were 41 Short 360 in service: 17 with Air Cargo Carriers, 6 with TransAir, 4 with Skyway Enterprises, 3 with Air Flamenco, 2 with Benair, Deraya Air Taxi, and 1 each with Ayit Aviation, Comeravia, Gryphon Airlines, International Trans Air Business, Malu Aviation and Nightexpress. The Short 360 specifically proved very popular with the UK's regional airlines including the Isle of Man-based Manx Airlines. This fed passengers into larger hubs in England, Scotland, Northern Ireland and Ireland.

Current and previous operators have included:

=== Civil operators ===
Australia

- Hazelton Airlines
- Murray Valley Airlines
- Sunshine Express Airlines
- Sunstate Airlines (QantasLink)
- Airlines of Tasmania

Aruba

- Tiara Air

Bahamas

- Bahamasair
- Pineapple Air

Canada

- Pacific Coastal Airlines
- Time Air

China

- CAAC Airlines
- China Southern Airlines

Costa Rica

- SANSA

Democratic Republic of Congo

- Malu Aviation

Comoros

- SAP Air Group

Germany

- Nightexpress
- Rheinland Air Service (RAS)
- Express Airways

Greece

- Olympic Airways

Guam

- Freedom Air

Guatemala

- Inter Regional

Guernsey

- Aurigny

Honduras

- Isleña Airlines

Ireland

- Aer Arann
- Aer Lingus

Israel

- Ayit Aviation and Tourism

Malaysia

- Malaysia Air Charter

Nicaragua

- La Costeña

Northern Mariana Islands

- Pacific Island Aviation

Panama

- Aeroperlas

Philippines

- Philippine Airlines

Portugal

- Aero Vip

Puerto Rico

- Air Flamenco
- M&N Aviation

Seychelles

- Air Seychelles (Former)

Thailand

- Thai Airways International

United Kingdom

- Air Ecosse
- Air Europe
- AirUK
- BAC Express Airlines
- Bon Accord Airways
- British Regional Airways/Loganair
- Capital Airlines (UK)
- CityFlyer Express
- Connectair
- Community Express Airlines
- Emerald Airways
- Euroworld / CityFlyer Express
- Gill Airways
- HD Air (formerly BAC Express)
- Jersey European (now Flybe)
- Loganair
- Manx Airlines
- Titan Airways

United States

- Atlantic Southeast Airlines (ASA)
- Allegheny Commuter (operated by Pennsylvania Airlines and Suburban Airlines)
- American Eagle Airlines (operated by Executive Airlines, Flagship Airlines and Simmons Airlines)
- Air Cargo Carriers
- Business Express
- Comair
- Dash Air
- FedEx Express
- Gulfstream International Airlines
- Imperial Airlines
- Interisland Airways (Hawaii)
- Mississippi Valley Airlines
- Skyway Enterprises, Inc
- Trans Executive Airlines
- Trans International Express
- United Express (operated by WestAir Commuter Airlines)
- US Airways Express (operated by Allegheny Commuter Airlines)
- US Forest Service (smokejumper aircraft)
A number of small air cargo airlines have also operated the Short 360 in freight operations in the U.S.

=== Military operators ===
United States

- US Army

Venezuela

- Venezuelan Air Force (Fuerza Aérea Venezolana)

== Accidents and incidents ==
The Short 360 has been involved in 15 hull-loss accidents, resulting in the loss of 16 airframes (defined as either "destroyed" or otherwise "written off" for insurance purposes):

- 22 October 1985: A CAAC flight overran the runway while landing at Enshi Airport. There were no fatalities, but the airframe was written off.
- 31 January 1986: An Aer Lingus flight crashed on approach to East Midlands Airport, UK, due to airframe icing and turbulent conditions. There were no fatalities, but the airframe was written off.
- 13 December 1987: Philippine Airlines Flight 443, using a Short 360 registration EI-BTJ crashed into a 5,000' mountain in the Philippines while approaching Iligan. All 11 passengers and 4 crew on board were killed.
- 28 November 1989: The prototype aircraft, G-ROOM, was destroyed by a bomb planted near the aircraft at Belfast City Airport, Northern Ireland. The device had been planted by the IRA. There were no fatalities.
- 20 August 1990: A CCAir aircraft parked at Charlotte-Douglas Airport (Charlotte, North Carolina, US) was blown by a wind gust into an electrical power cart, and a fire started. There were no fatalities, but the airframe was written off.
- 25 November 1997: An aircraft operated by Corporate Air landed heavily at Billings-Logan Airport (Billings, Montana, US) in gusty wind conditions. The nosewheel strut collapsed, leading to a crash with the loss of the airframe. There were no fatalities.
- 9 February 1998: A British Regional Airlines aircraft landed heavily at Stornoway Airport In Scotland. The undercarriage was damaged leading to a crash with the loss of the airframe. There were no fatalities.

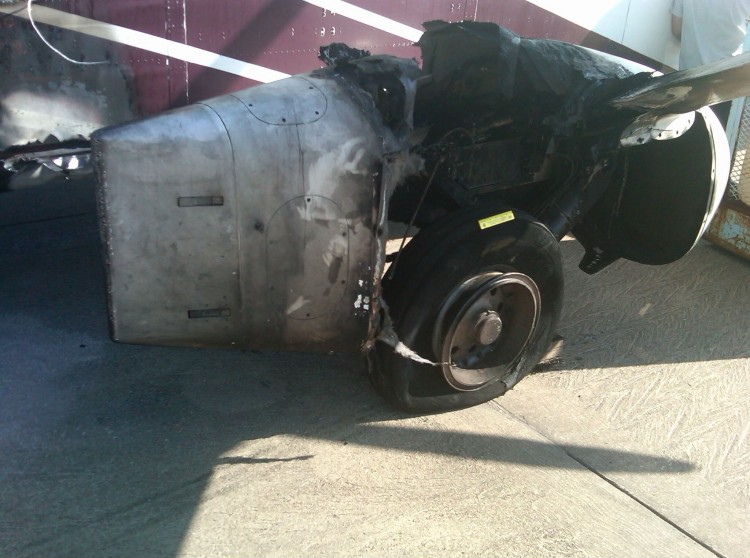
Air Cargo Carriers Flight 1290 damage caused by brake fire.

- 13 January 2000: A Sirte Oil Company Short 360 crashed on approach near Brega; 22 of the 41 passengers and crew on board were killed.
- 23 September 2000: A Gill Airways flight was forced to make an emergency landing after its left engine failed. There were no injuries.
- 4 February 2001: Short 360-100 registration EI-BPD, carrying 25 passengers and 3 crew, was damaged beyond repair following a hard landing at Sheffield City Airport after a scheduled Aer Arann Express passenger flight from Dublin. There were no injuries.
- 27 February 2001: Loganair Flight 670A crashed into the Firth of Forth in Scotland shortly after takeoff from Edinburgh Airport. Both engines failed after ingesting blowing snow while on the ground. Both pilots were killed (no others on board).
- 21 August 2004: A Venezuelan Air Force Short 360 crashed into a mountain while descending to land at Maracay, killing all 30 people on board in the deadliest aviation accident involving a Short 360.

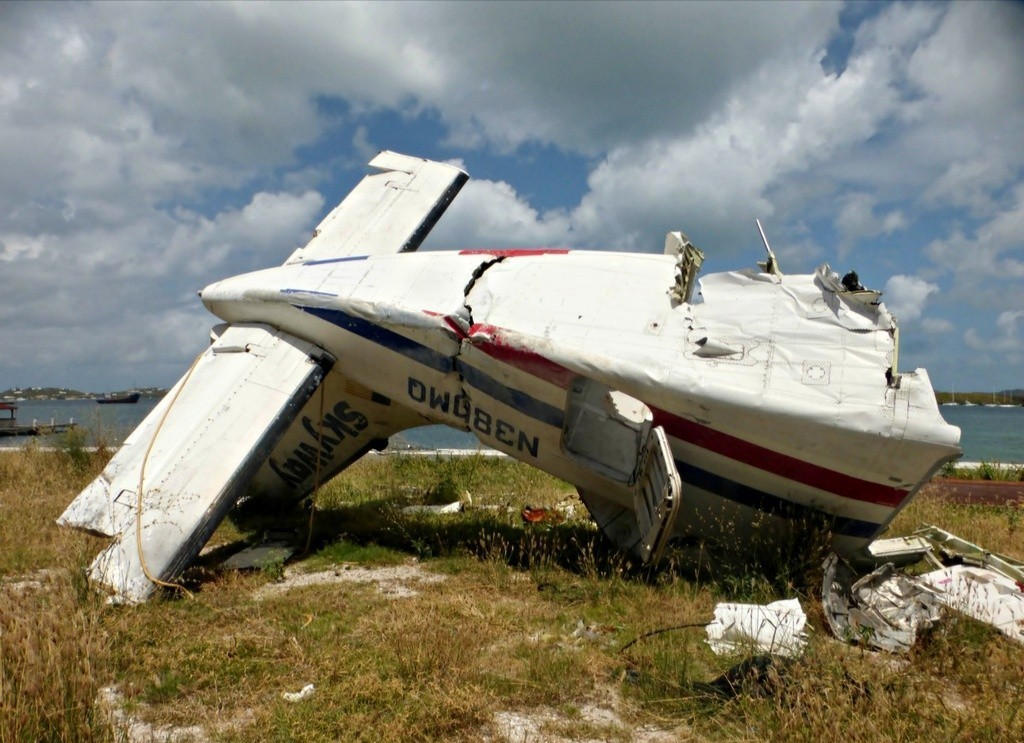
The wrecked tail section of N380MQ

- 16 December 2004: An Air Cargo Carriers aircraft was lost at Oshawa Municipal Airport. After landing on a snow-covered runway, the pilot attempted a go-around when he realized he would be unable to stop. The aircraft failed to gain altitude and crashed. There were no fatalities.
- 5 February 2006: Two Short 360-300 freighters, modded for a DOD contract, operated by Air Cargo Carriers, were flying in formation when they collided near Watertown, Wisconsin, US. N3735W attempted to maneuver below N372AC in a right turn and struck the left/ underside of N372AC. The left wing outer section of N3735W was struck and separated by the leading edge of N372AC's left wing, and the aircraft crashed, killing all three occupants. The left propeller of N3735W had struck the forward section of the left "stub wing" of N372AC (the structure housing the left main landing gear and hydraulic service panel). N372AC sustained severe damage, including structural, engine, propeller (losing several blades), aerodynamic, and complete hydraulic failure (affecting flaps, landing gear, nose wheel steering, and primary brakes). The crew managed to make an emergency landing at Dodge County Airport in Juneau, WI (KUNU), but overran the runway due to the damage to the aircraft. The left aileron of N3735W was found on the runway that N372AC landed on. Both crewmen survived uninjured, but N372AC was damaged beyond reasonable repair.
- 17 May 2012: An Air Cargo Carriers Short 360 (registration N617FB) was substantially damaged following a wheel brake fire during taxi at the George Bush Intercontinental Airport, Houston, Texas. There were no injuries to the flight crew of two. The airplane was 60 pounds over maximum takeoff weight and during the long taxi to position for takeoff the crew used a higher than normal power setting and rode the brakes in an attempt to lower weight by burning fuel. Its intended destination was Austin, Texas.
- 29 October 2014: Skyway Enterprises Flight 7101, a Short SD-360 (registration N380MQ) cargo flight on behalf of FedEx, scheduled from Sint Maarten, Kingdom of Netherlands to San Juan, Puerto Rico lost altitude during climb out and crashed into the water about 2 nautical miles off the end of runway at about 18:35L (22:35 UTC), killing both members of the flight crew.
- 23 December 2021: A Malu Aviation Shorts 360-300 is reported to have crashed in D.R. Congo, killing all five on board.

== Specifications (360-300) ==
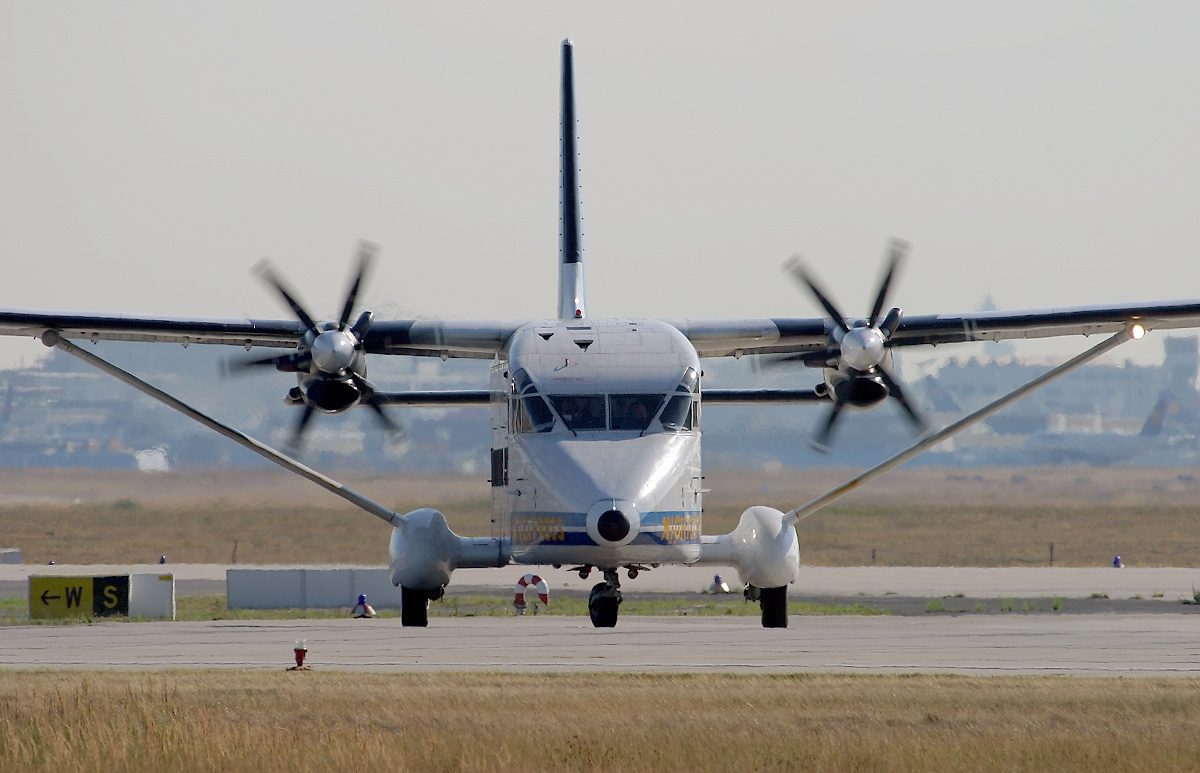
Front view showing the square cross section and braced wing

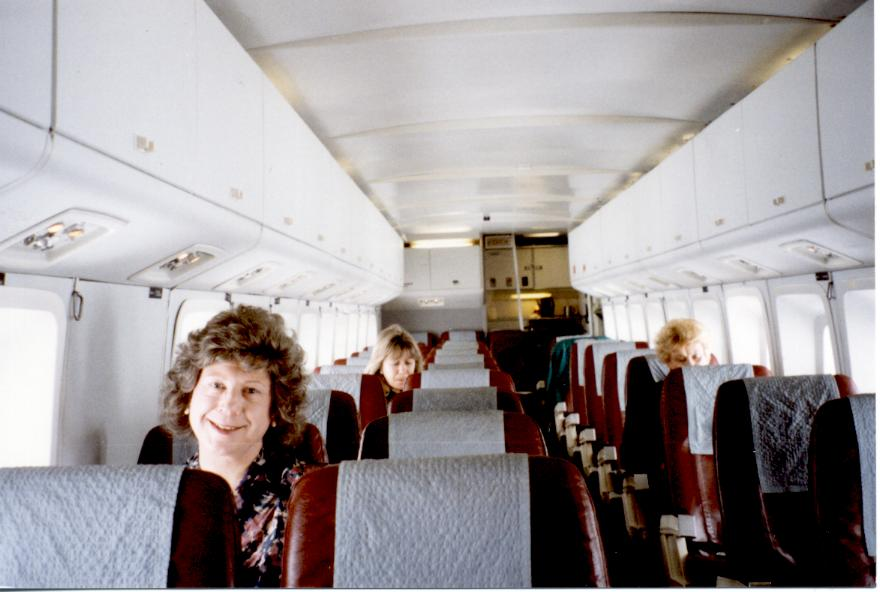
Three-abreast seating of aircraft

Data from Flight International

General characteristics

- Crew: Three (Two pilots plus one cabin crew)
- Capacity: 36 passengers
- Length: 21.58 m (70 ft 10 in)
- Wingspan: 22.81 m (74 ft 10 in)
- Height: 7.21 m (23 ft 8 in)
- Wing area: 42.09 m^{2} (454 sq ft)
- Airfoil: NACA 63A modified
- Empty weight: 7,870 kg (17,350 lb)
- Max takeoff weight: 12,292 kg (27,099 lb)
- Fuel capacity: 2,182 L (480 imp gal; 576 US gal)
- Powerplant: 2 × Pratt & Whitney Canada PT6A-65AR turboprop, 1,062 kW (1,424 shp) each

Performance

- Maximum speed: 404 km/h (251 mph, 218 kn) (max cruise at FL 100)
- Cruise speed: 330 km/h (210 mph, 180 kn) (Long range cruise at FL100)
- Range: 1,595 km (991 mi, 861 nmi) full tanks, 2,569 kg (5,664 lb) payload
- Service ceiling: 6,100 m (20,000 ft) MSL
- Rate of climb: 4.84 m/s (952 ft/min)
- Fuel consumption: 1.01 kg/km (3.57 lb/mi) 820 lb (370 kg)/h at 200 kn (230 mph; 370 km/h) TAS

== See also ==
Related development

- Short 330
- Short C-23 Sherpa
- Short SC.7 Skyvan

Related lists

- List of civil aircraft
