= Pacific Island Aviation =

Airline of the Northern Mariana Islands (1987–2005)

IATA	ICAO	Call sign
9J	PSA	PACIFIC ISLE
- Founded: 1987; 39 years ago
- Commenced operations: August 1988; 38 years ago
- Ceased operations: 9 February 2005; 21 years ago
- Hubs: Saipan International Airport
- Frequent-flyer program: WorldPerks
- Headquarters: Garapan, Saipan, Northern Mariana Islands
- Key people: Robert Christian, owner

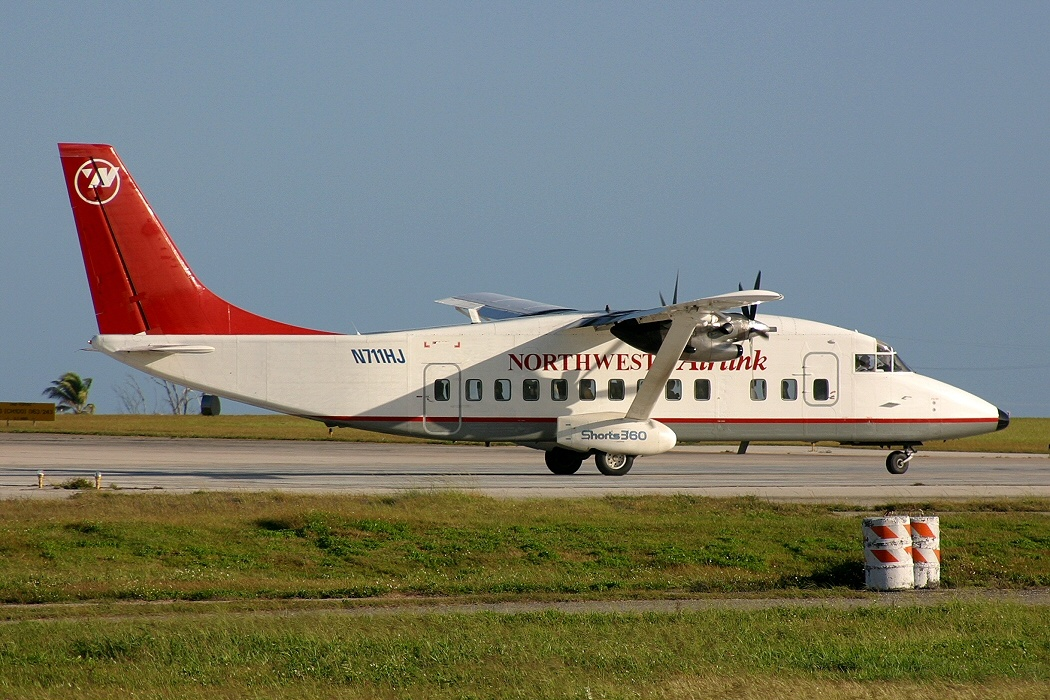
Short 360 at Antonio B. Won Pat International Airport in 2004

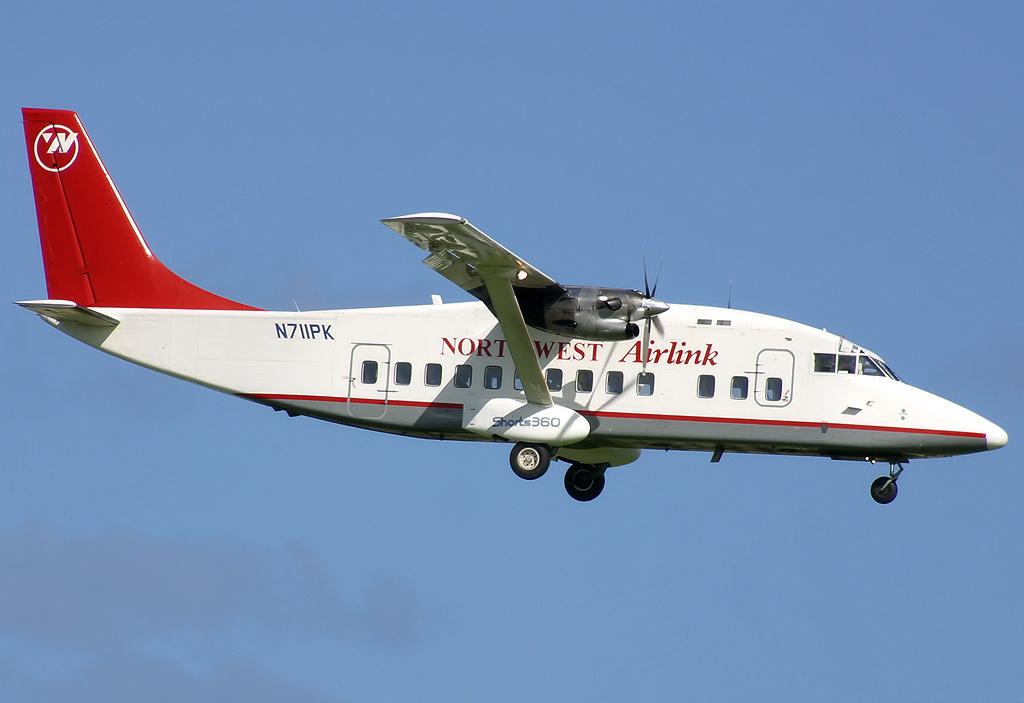
Short 360 in 2004

Pacific Island Aviation (PIA) was a commuter airline headquartered on the second floor of the Cabrera Center in Garapan, Saipan, Northern Mariana Islands. It operated passenger and cargo services. Its main base was Saipan International Airport. PIA's last flight was February 9, 2005.

== History ==
The airline was established in 1987 and began helicopter operations in August 1988. It secured commuter airline status in February 1992 and started operations as such on 21 March 1992. It became a codeshare partner with Continental Micronesia in December 1992 and took over flights to Guam, Rota and Saipan. In February 1995 Continental discontinued its service to Rota and Pacific Island Aviation began codesharing with Northwest Airlines, becoming a Northwest Airlink carrier in February 1998. It was wholly owned by Robert Christian.

After it discontinued service in Saipan, the airline attempted to restart its operations, but base itself out of Texas, providing flights from Dallas to Lake Charles and Beaumont. It planned to operate as Tri-Star Airways.

== Services ==
As of January 2005 Pacific Island Aviation operated the following services:

- Guam (U.S.)
  - Antonio B. Won Pat International Airport
- Northern Mariana Islands (U.S.)
  - Rota (Rota International Airport)
  - Saipan (Saipan International Airport)

(Services to Tinian International Airport on Tinian were suspended before the airline went out of business.)

== Incidents and accidents ==
- 27 October 1992 - Pacific Island Aviation Cessna 310R aircraft, at Saipan, two fatalities.

== Fleet ==
As of March 2005 the Pacific Island Aviation fleet included:

Type	Total	Passengers				Operation
Type	Total	F	Y+	Y	Total	Operation
Short 360	3	—	—	30	30	All operated for Northwest Airlink

== See also ==
- List of defunct airlines of the United States
- Freedom Air (Guam), another defunct airline operated from 1974 to 2013
