= Nightexpress =

German cargo airline

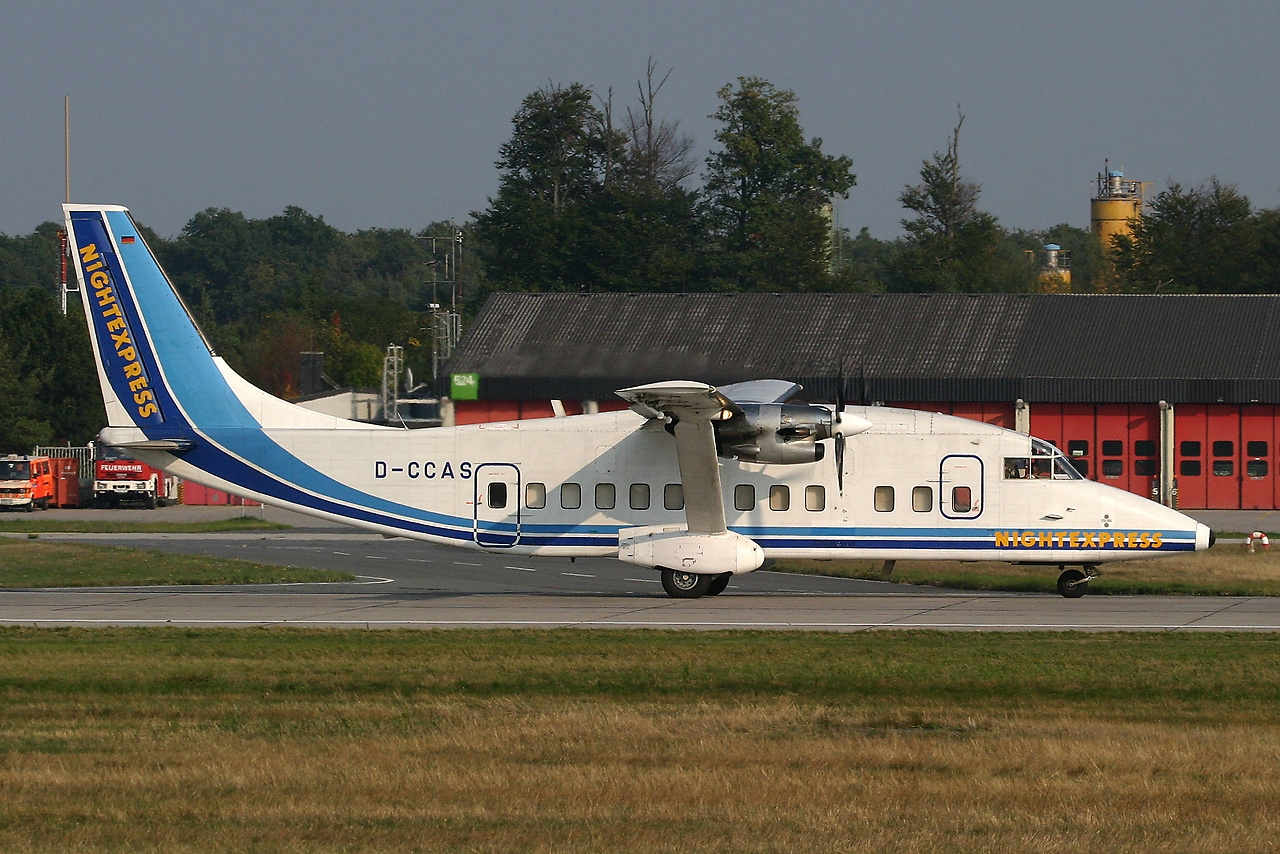
- Short 360
IATA	ICAO	Call sign
-	EXT	EXECUTIVE
- Founded: 1984
- Commenced operations: 1984
- Ceased operations: 2017
- Operating bases: Frankfurt Airport
- Fleet size: 2
- Headquarters: Frankfurt, Germany
- Key people: Yvonne Boag, Managing Director
- Website: nightexpress.de

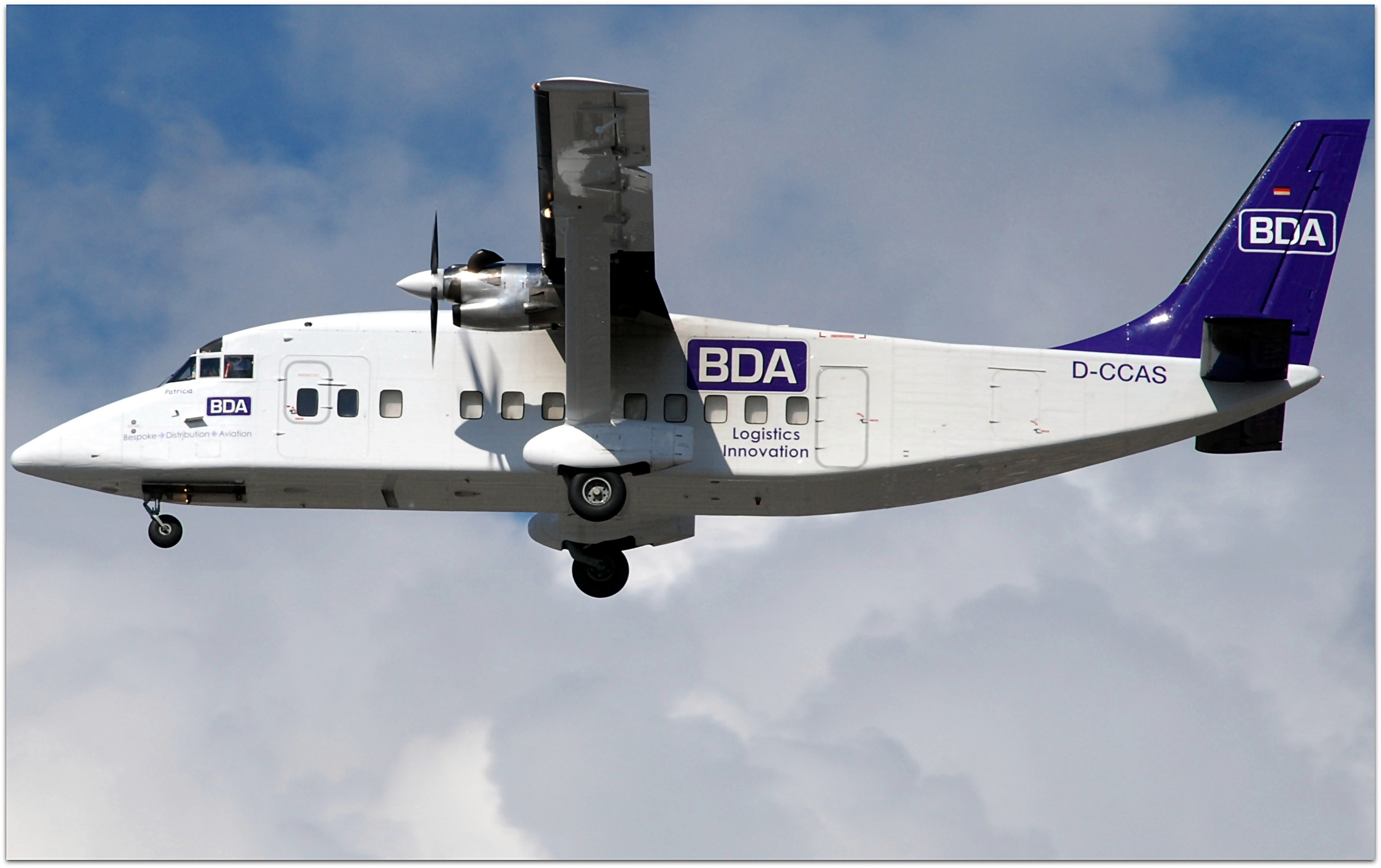
A Short 360 with BDA titles

Nightexpress Luftverkehrsgesellschaft mbH was a small German cargo airline based at Frankfurt Airport. In 2013, the company was bought by BDA (Bespoke Distribution Aviation). The company ceased operations in late 2017.

== Destinations ==
Nightexpress operated scheduled and chartered cargo flights from Frankfurt Airport, most of which were either to Birmingham Airport or Coventry Airport.

== Fleet ==
As of December 2015, the Nightexpress fleet consisted of the following aircraft:

Aircraft	Total	Notes
Short 360	2	
Total	2	

== Accidents and incidents ==
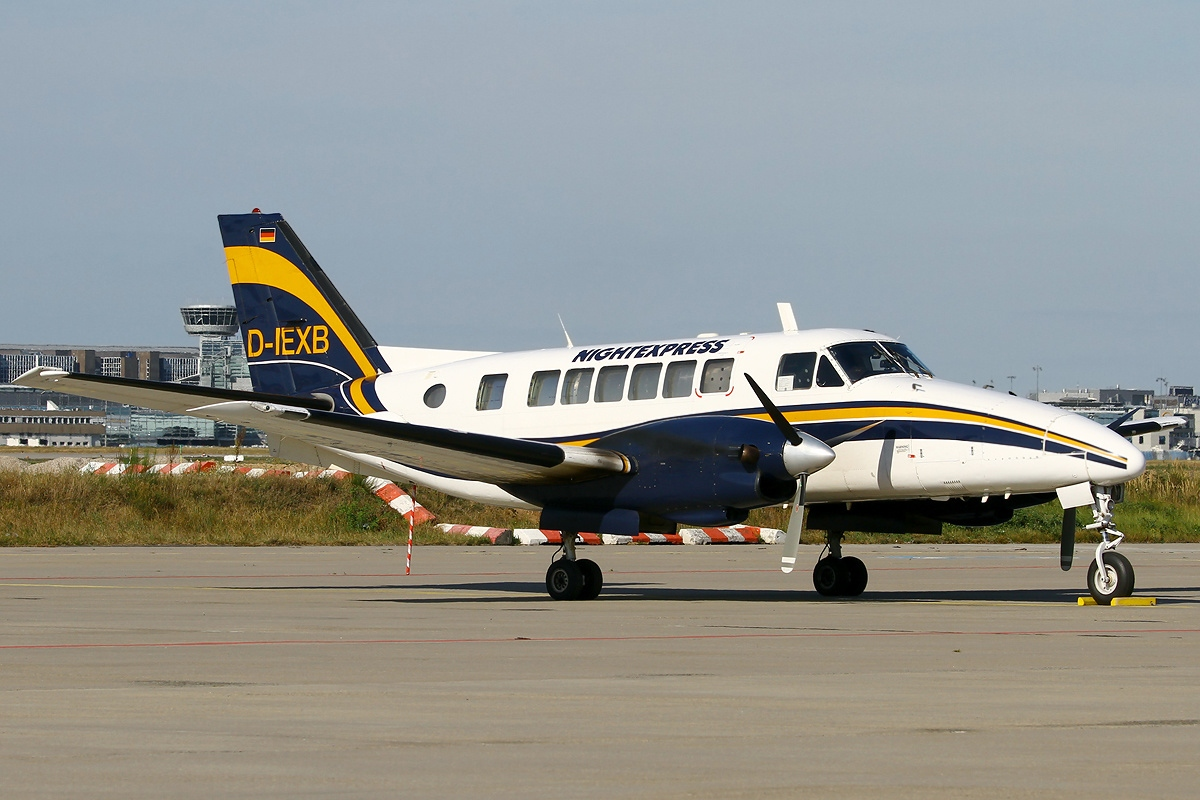
Beechcraft 99 which crased in 1999

- On 30 June 1999 at 02:41 UTC, Nightexpress Flight 114, a Beechcraft Model 99 (registered D-IBEX) crashed near Liège Airport, Belgium, killing the two pilots on board. The aircraft had left Luton Airport at 01:25 UTC for a cargo flight to Frankfurt Airport, when the pilots reported failures in both engines at 02:34 UTC. The aircraft was cleared to perform an emergency landing at either Brussels Airport or Liège Airport, but ultimately crashed 5 nautical miles short of the latter's runway.
