= HD Air Ltd =

British cargo airline, 1992–2009

IATA	ICAO	Call sign
-	RPX	RAPEX
- Founded: September 1992 (as BAC Aircraft)
- Commenced operations: September 1992 (as BAC Aircraft)
- Ceased operations: 2015 (as HD Air)
- Hubs: Birmingham
- Fleet size: 1
- Parent company: Jutlandia Group
- Headquarters: Birmingham, United Kingdom
- Key people: David O'Brien Robert Davies, Terry Dixon
- Website: http://www.hdair.com/

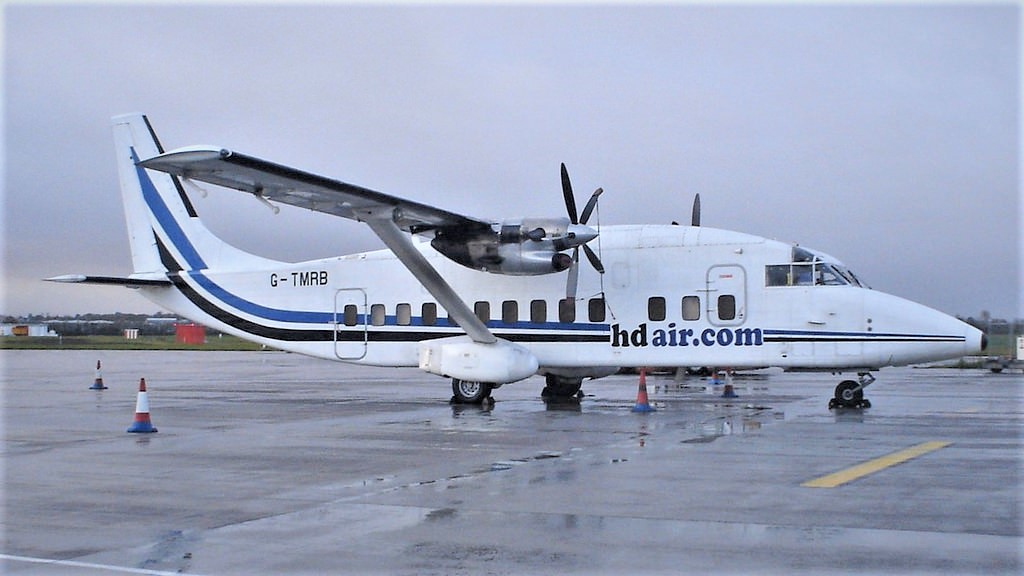
Shorts 360 on runway.

HD Air Ltd. - formerly BAC Aircraft and BAC Express Airlines brand - was a British cargo airline based in Oxfordshire, United Kingdom. It operated contract services for the Royal Mail and other express courier companies, as well as ad hoc freight charters throughout Europe. The main operating bases were Aberdeen Airport, Coventry Airport, Inverness Airport and Luton Airport. HD Air Limited held a United Kingdom Civil Aviation Authority Type A Operating Licence, permitting it to carry cargo and mail.

== History ==
The airline was established in September 1992 as BAC Aircraft Ltd. and started operations on third-parties behalf. It was formed as part of the BAC Group (established in 1982) and was rebranded BAC Express Airlines in 1995. Own operations were launched in December 1993.

A majority holding (75%) was acquired by Air Contractors of Ireland on 27 February 2004 and in the following months BAC Aircraft merged operations with those of Irish Air contractors airline. In 2005 it was sold to the 2morrow Group. In December 2007, the airline was renamed HD Air to bring it into line with 2morrow Group sister company HD Ferries. In 2009 the company was sold to Jutlandia Holdings and in 2019 halted all operations.

== Fleet ==
HD Air fleet consisted of a single Shorts 360 at Oct 2009.

== See also ==
- List of defunct airlines of the United Kingdom
