= 1999 in aviation =

This is a list of aviation-related events from 1999.

== Events ==
=== January ===
- January 1 – The Government of Zimbabwe establishes the Civil Aviation Authority of Zimbabwe as Zimbabwe′s national civil aviation authority. It replaces the Department of Civil Aviation in this role.
- January 5
  - In two separate incidents, four Iraqi Air Force Mikoyan-Gurevich MiG-25s violate the no-fly zone over southern Iraq. Two United States Air Force McDonnell Douglas F-15 Eagles and two United States Navy Grumman F-14 Tomcats participating in Operation Southern Watch fire a total of six air-to-air missiles at the MiG-25s but score no hits.
  - Rio de Janeiro–Galeão International Airport in Rio de Janeiro, Brazil, is renamed Rio de Janeiro/RIOgaleão–Antonio Carlos Jobim International Airport.

Five Iraqi Air Force jets violate the no-fly zone over southern Iraq and two others violate the no-fly zone over northern Iraq. The United States claims that Iraqi aircraft have violated the two no-fly zones a total of 70 times since Operation Desert Fox took place in mid-December 1998.

=== February ===
- February 1 – The Oneworld airline alliance begins operations. Its founding members are American Airlines, British Airways, Canadian Airlines, Cathay Pacific, and Qantas.
- February 24 – China Southwest Airlines Flight 4509, a Tupolev Tu-154, crashes into a field in Ruian, China, while descending to land at Wenzhou Airport in Wenzhou. All 61 passengers and crew members are killed.
- February 25 – The Government of Italy creates the Agenzia Nazionale per la Sicurezza del Volo (ANSV) – "National Agency for the Safety of Flight" – Italy's first agency responsible for aviation accident investigations, concentrating responsibility for such investigations in one agency for the first time. Previously, two investigations of each aviation accident in Italy took place, a perfunctory investigation by the director of the airport where the accident occurred and a formal and technical investigation by an ad hoc committee appointed by the Minister of Infrastructure and Transport.

=== March ===
- March 1 – The hot-air balloon Breitling Orbiter 3, with pilots Bertrand Piccard and Brian Jones, begins the first non-stop, round-the-world balloon flight. They will complete the flight on March 19, setting a new distance record for any type of aircraft of 40,804 kilometers (25,360 miles).
- March 10 – Peru's flag carrier, Aeroperú, ceases operations due to financial difficulties. The airline will be liquidated in August.
- March 24–25 (overnight)
  - At dusk, F/A-18 Hornets of the Spanish Air Force are the first North Atlantic Treaty Organization (NATO) planes to bomb Belgrade and perform suppression of enemy air defenses operations as NATO begins Operation Allied Force, a bombing campaign against the Federal Republic of Yugoslavia in the Kosovo War involving 1,000 aircraft operating from air bases in Italy and Germany and from the U.S. Navy aircraft carrier USS Theodore Roosevelt (CVN-71) in the Adriatic Sea.
  - Five Yugoslav MiG-29 (NATO reporting name "Fulcrum") fighters get airborne to oppose the NATO attack. U.S. Air Force fighters – one of them an F-15C Eagle – shoot down two of them, and a Royal Netherlands Air Force F-16AM Fighting Falcon damages a third MiG-29, which never flies again. Yugoslav air defense forces mistakenly shoot down a MiG-29 with a 2K12 Kub (NATO reporting name "SA-6 Gainful") surface-to-air missile in a friendly fire incident, and only one of the MiG-29s returns to base safely.
- March 25
  - During a low-level attack on Kosovo Liberation Army positions in Kosovo, a Yugoslav J-22 Orao crashes into a hill, killing its pilot. Yugoslavia also loses a MiG-29 destroyed in a landing accident at Ponikve Airbase.
  - Two U.S. Air Force F-15 Eagles intercept two Yugoslav MiG-29s; one of the F-15s shoots down both MiG-29s.
- March 27 – After Yugoslav air defense operators find that they can detect U.S. Air Force F-117 Nighthawk stealth attack aircraft using supposedly obsolete Soviet-made radars operating on long wavelengths, the 3rd Battalion of the Yugoslav 250th Missile Brigade shoots down an F-117 with an S-125 Neva/Pechora (NATO reporting name "SA-3 Goa") surface-to-air missile; its pilot ejects and is rescued by search-and-rescue forces near Belgrade. It is the first, and so far the only, time a stealth aircraft has been shot down.

=== April ===
- April 7 – Flying in bad weather, the Turkish Airlines Boeing 737-4Q8 Trakya, operating as Flight 5904, a repositioning flight with no passengers aboard, crashes near Hamdilli in the Ceyhan district of Adana Province, Turkey, killing the entire crew of six.

=== May ===
- May 2
  - The 3rd Battalion of the Yugoslav 250th Missile Brigade shoots down a U.S. Air Force F-16 Fighting Falcon near Šabac, Yugoslavia, with an S-125 Neva/Pechora (NATO reporting name "SA-3 Goa") surface-to-air missile. Its pilot is rescued.
  - A Yugoslav Strela 2 (NATO reporting name "SA-7 Grail") shoulder-launched surface-to-air missile heavily damages a U.S. Air Force A-10 Thunderbolt II over Kosovo, forcing it to make an emergency landing at Skopje "Alexander the Great" Airport in Skopje, Macedonia.
- May 3 – Ansett Australia and Air New Zealand join the Star Alliance. They increase the Star Alliance's service to a total of 720 destinations in 110 countries with a combined fleet of 1,650 aircraft.
- May 4 – Two U.S. Air Force F-16 Fighting Falcons shoot down a Yugoslav MiG-29 (NATO reporting name "Fulcrum") at low altitude over Valjevo, Yugoslavia.
- May 7–8 (overnight) – U.S. Air Force B-2 Spirit bombers of the 509th Bomb Wing flying directly from Whiteman Air Force Base, Missouri, attempt to bomb a Yugoslav warehouse in the Belgrade district of Novi Beograd with JDAM bombs but, because the Central Intelligence Agency has provided incorrect coordinates, instead hit the nearby embassy of the People's Republic of China with five JDAMs, killing three Chinese journalists and injuring 20 people. The United States apologizes for the attack, which outrages China.
- May 23 – Austin–Bergstrom International Airport opens in Austin, Texas, and all commercial air carriers move to the new airport, having vacated Robert Mueller Municipal Airport on May 21. Mueller is permanently closed and subsequently redeveloped for non-aviation uses.

=== June ===
- June 1 – American Airlines Flight 1420, a McDonnell Douglas MD-82, overruns the runway and crashes upon landing in Little Rock, Arkansas, killing 11 and injuring 110.
- June 10 – Operation Allied Force, the North Atlantic Treaty Organization (NATO) bombing campaign in the Federal Republic of Yugoslavia during the Kosovo War, comes to an end after 78 days. NATO aircraft have flown over 38,000 sorties without the loss of any personnel to enemy action.

=== July ===
- July 1
  - Australia′s Bureau of Air Safety Investigation merges with the Marine Incident Investigation Unit and parts of the Federal Office of Road Safety to form the Australian Transport Safety Bureau.
  - The Netherlands Aviation Safety Board merges into the Dutch Transport Safety Board, which takes over the responsibility for aviation accident investigations in the Netherlands.
  - Norway reorganizes its Accident Investigation Board for Civil Aviation – the future Accident Investigation Board Norway – splitting it from the Ministry of Transport and Communications and making it an independent agency of the Government of Norway.
- July 9 – A fire that breaks out in the shashlik kitchen of Almaty International Airport in Almaty, Kazakhstan, burns down the entire passenger terminal, in a few hours. A new terminal will open in 2004.
- July 16 – A Piper Saratoga piloted by John F. Kennedy Jr. – the son of President John F. Kennedy – crashes into the Atlantic Ocean off Martha's Vineyard, Massachusetts, killing all three people on board: Kennedy, his wife Carolyn Bessette-Kennedy, and her sister, Lauren Bessette.
- July 20 – Rio de Janeiro–Galeão International Airport in Rio de Janeiro, Brazil, opens its second terminal, Passenger Terminal 2. The airport's two terminals can handle 7.5 million passengers per year.
- July 23 – Wielding a knife, passenger Yuji Nishizawa hijacks All Nippon Airways Flight 61, a Boeing 747. After he fatally stabs the captain, he is overpowered by the crew and the co-pilot lands the plane safely at Haneda, Japan.
- July 28 – Trans World Airlines and Trans States Airlines renew their marketing and codeshare agreement, under which Trans State provides Trans World Express regional service from TWA's hub at St. Louis, Missouri.

=== August ===
- Sammy Popov and Chuck "Da Kine" Raggs showcase their wingsuit designs side by side at the World Freefall Convention at Quincy, Illinois; both designs perform well. At the same event, multiple-formation wingsuit skydives including wingsuits designed by Patrick de Gayardon, Popov, and Raggs take place.
- August 7 – Cabo Verde Airlines Flight 5002, a Dornier 228 chartered from the Cape Verde Coast Guard, crashes into a cliff on Santo Antão, Cape Verde, during poor weather. All 18 people on board die.
- August 10 – Two Indian Air Force MiG-21 fighters shoot down a Pakistan Naval Air Arm Breguet Atlantique maritime patrol aircraft, killing all 16 men aboard the Atlantique. The Atlantique crashes in the Great Rann of Kutch inside Pakistan, although India claims it had violated Indian airspace.
- August 18 – Peru′s flag carrier, Aeroperú, is liquidated. It had ceased operations in March due to financial difficulties.
- August 22 – Mandarin Airlines Flight 642, a McDonnell Douglas MD-11, crashes on landing at Hong Kong during Tropical Storm Sam. Of the 315 people on board, three die and 208 are injured, 44 of them seriously.
- August 24 – Onboard Uni Air Flight 873, after landing at Hualien Airport, a fire starts in an overhead luggage compartment after fumes from a bottle of household cleaner accidentally ignite. One person dies.
- August 31 – LAPA Flight 3142, Boeing 737 overshoots the runway in Buenos Aires, Argentina, and crashes into a golf course. Of the 103 people on board, 64 are killed, as are 10 people on the ground.

=== September ===
- September 1
  - Air Nostrum, Finnair, and Iberia join the Oneworld airline alliance.
  - Iberia absorbs the Spanish airline Aviaco, which had operated since February 1948.
- September 4–12 – The 11th FAI World Rally Flying Championship takes place in Ravenna, Italy. Individual winners are: 1st, Krzysztof Wieczorek and Wacław Wieczorek (Poland); 2nd, Janusz Darocha and Zbigniew Chrząszcz (Poland); 3rd, Nigel Hopkins and Dale de Klerk (South Africa). Team winners are: 1st, Poland; 2nd, Czech Republic; 3rd, France.
- September 14
  - Britannia Airways Flight 226A, a chartered Boeing 757-204 with 245 people on board, crashes on landing at Girona-Costa Brava Airport in Girona, Spain, killing one person and injuring 43, two of them seriously.
  - Olympic Airways Flight 3838, a Dassault Falcon 900B, experiences several pilot-induced oscillations while descending into Bucharest Henri Coandă International Airport, killing seven people including Greek deputy foreign minister Giannos Kranidiotis.
- September 23 – Qantas Flight 1, a Boeing 747, overshoots the runway upon landing in Bangkok, Thailand. None of the 410 people on board are seriously injured.

=== October ===
- October 11 – Chris Phatswe, a disgruntled and suicidal Air Botswana pilot, commandeers an empty ATR-42 airliner belonging to the airline and circles Sir Seretse Khama International Airport in Gaborone, Botswana, for two hours before crashing his plane into the airline's other two ATR-42s, which are parked on the ground, killing himself and destroying all three airliners. The incident destroys three of Air Botswana's four planes and leaves it with no operational aircraft.
- October 15 – All Nippon Airways joins the Star Alliance.
- October 17 – FedEx Express Flight 087, a McDonnell Douglas MD-11F, crashed after landing at Subic Bay International Airport. Both pilots survived with minor injuries.
- October 19 – The Indonesian airline Lion Air is founded. it will begin flight operations in June 2000.
- October 25 – A Learjet 35 loses cabin pressure in flight, incapacitating everyone on board. It flies for almost four more hours, covering almost 1,500 miles (2,415 km), on autopilot before crashing due to fuel exhaustion near Aberdeen, South Dakota. All six people on board die, including professional golfer and 1999 U.S. Open winner Payne Stewart and golf course architect Bruce Borland.
- October 31 – EgyptAir Flight 990, a Boeing 767 on its way Cairo, Egypt, crashes into the Atlantic Ocean off Nantucket, Massachusetts. All 217 people on board die, including Canadian journalist Claude Masson, in the deadliest aviation disaster of 1999.

=== November ===
- November 1 – Trans World Airlines (TWA) makes San Juan, Puerto Rico, its first "focus city." Under the "focus city" concept, TWA increases its service at San Juan to 15 flights per day to eight destinations, and Gulfstream International Airlines flies Trans World Connection turboprop service from San Juan to six Caribbean destinations.
- November 3 – Trans World Airlines announces a marketing and codeshare agreement with Indianapolis, Indiana-based Chatauqua Airlines under which Chatauqua will begin Trans World Express regional jet service in the summer of 2000.
- November 9 – TAESA Lineas Aéreas Flight 725, a McDonnell Douglas DC-9, crashes near Uruapan, Mexico killing all 18 on board.
- November 12 – Si Fly Flight 3275, an ATR 42-300 operating on behalf as the United Nations, crashed shortly before landing at Pristina International Airport, Pristina, Kosovo. All 24 occupants on board were killed.
- November 13 – The longest missing-aircraft search in New Hampshire's history ends after almost three years when the wreckage of an Aircraft Charter Group, Inc., Learjet 35A that had disappeared in fog and rain near Dorchester, New Hampshire, on December 24, 1996, finally is found near Smarts Mountain in Grafton County, New Hampshire, about 20 miles (32 km) from where it took off at Sikorsky Memorial Airport in Bridgeport, Connecticut. Its two-person crew had died in the 1996 crash.
- November 18 – Trans World Airlines (TWA) announces a major service expansion in which it adds 46 roundtrip flights per week. The expansion includes new or expanded service to Mexico, the Caribbean, Hawaii, and the Middle East.

=== December ===
- December 1 – Trans World Airlines (TWA) and Kuwait Airways begin codeshare service on Kuwait Airways flights between Kuwait City and John F. Kennedy International Airport in Queens, New York, and between Kuwait City and Chicago and on TWA flights between John F. Kennedy International Airport and Chicago.
- December 7 – Asian Spirit Flight 100, a Let L-410 Turbolet, crashes into a mountainside between the municipalities of Kasibu, Nueva Vizcaya, and Cabarroguis, Quirino in the Philippines, killing all 17 people on board. The wreckage is not found until the next day.
- December 11 – A SATA International British Aerospace ATP (Advanced Turbo-Prop) crashes on São Jorge Island in the Azores. All 35 people on board die.
- December 14 – The United States Border Patrol arrests the would-be "Millennium Bomber," Ahmed Ressam, when he arrives from Canada by ferry at Port Angeles, Washington, with timing devices and 130 pounds (59 kg) of explosives in his car. He had planned to bomb Los Angeles International Airport in Los Angeles, California, on the upcoming New Year's Eve.
- December 21
  - Cubana de Aviación Flight 1216, a McDonnell Douglas DC-10, overshoots the runway in Guatemala City, Guatemala, and crashes into homes, killing 16 of the 314 people on board and two people in the homes.
  - Trans World Airlines (TWA) takes delivery from Boeing of its last aircraft bearing the corporate name "Douglas," a McDonnell Douglas MD-83 named Spirit of Long Beach. The delivery brings a symbolic end to TWA's 67-year relationship with Douglas Aircraft, which began with the airline's order of the Douglas DC-1 airliner in 1932 and had continued through the McDonnell Douglas era and after McDonnell Douglas's 1997 merger with Boeing.
- December 22 – Korean Air Cargo Flight 8509, a Boeing 747-2B5F cargo aircraft, crashes into Hatfield Forest near Great Hallingbury, England, shortly after takeoff from London Stansted Airport, killing its entire crew of four.
- December 24 – Five gunmen hijack Indian Airlines Flight 814, an Airbus A300 with 188 other people on board, over India during a flight from Kathmandu, Nepal, to Delhi, India. The plane lands at Amritsar, India, to refuel, but takes off again without refueling before security forces can immobilize it. It then refuels at Lahore, Pakistan, and flies on to Dubai, where the hijackers release a mortally wounded man they had stabbed and 27 other passengers. The hijackers then force the plane to fly to Kandahar International Airport in Kandahar, Afghanistan, where, after several days of negotiations, they release all the remaining hostages on December 31 in exchange for the release of three senior Islamic fighters held by India.
- December 25 – Cubana de Aviación Flight 310, a Yakovlev Yak-42, crashes into a mountain near Bejuma, Venezuela, killing all 22 people on board.
- December 31 – Fear of the Y2K computer bug and possible in-flight consequences for those planes flying during the night of December 31, 1999, and the early morning of January 1, 2000, spreads around the airline industry.

== First flights ==
=== January ===
- January 26 – Ilyushin Il-114-100

=== February ===
- February 8 – Tupolev Tu-334

=== March ===
- March 9 – "Bort 501 Blue," prototype of the Sukhoi Su-30MKK

=== May ===
- May 27 – Bombardier CRJ700

=== July ===
- July 28 – Rotary Rocket Roton ATV

=== September ===
- September 8 – NASA Helios Prototype
- September 24 – Alenia C-27J Spartan

== Deadliest crash ==
The deadliest crash of this year was EgyptAir Flight 990, a Boeing 767 which crashed in the Atlantic Ocean near Nantucket, Massachusetts, U.S. on 31 October, killing all 217 people on board.
