= Eizaguirre =

Eizaguirre is a surname of Basque origins. Notable people with the surname include:

- Agustín Eizaguirre (1897–1961), Spanish footballer
- Guillermo Eizaguirre (1909–1986), Spanish football goalkeeper and manager
- Ignacio Eizaguirre (1920–2013), Spanish football goalkeeper
- Jose Echegaray y Eizaguirre (1832–1916), Spanish civil engineer, mathematician, statesman, and dramatist
- Unai Osa Eizaguirre (born 1975), Spanish former road bicycle racer

== See also ==
- Aguirre (disambiguation)
- Eyzaguirre (disambiguation)
- Izaguirre
