= Cubana de Aviación accidents and incidents =

Cubana de Aviación, the national carrier of Cuba, has been involved in 51 incidents and accidents between 1934 and 2018, 27 of which had one fatality or more, with 708 fatalities. Included are ground and collision fatalities and hijackings.

== List ==
Date	Location	Aircraft	Tail number	Aircraft damage	Fatalities	Description	Refs
10 December 1934	(Cuba) Palma Soriano	Ford Trimotor	NM-7	W/O	4/8	Crashed into mountain in heavy rain.	
25 November 1950	(Cuba) Holguín	DC-3A	CU-T7	W/O	0	Crashed in fog at Frank País Airport.	
25 April 1951	(United States) Key West	DC-4	CU-T188	W/O	43/43	The aircraft was due to operate an international scheduled Miami–Havana passenger service as Flight 493 when it experienced a mid-air collision at about 4,000 feet (1,200 m), shortly after it departed Miami International Airport, with a US Navy SNB-1 Kansan. There were 39 occupants aboard the Cuban airliner, whereas the military aircraft had four people on board. All of them died in the accident.	
6 December 1952	Bermuda	DC-4	CU-T397	W/O	37/41	Crashed into the sea, 4.5 kilometres (2.8 mi) northeast of Kindley Field, during initial climbout. The aircraft was due to operate the last leg of an international scheduled Madrid–Santa Maria–Bermuda–Havana passenger service, with Bermuda being a refuelling stop.	
17 May 1954	(Cuba) Havana	Curtiss C-46A	CU-C556	W/O	0	Landing gear collapsed on landing at Rancho-Boyeros Airport.	
9 April 1958	(Mexico) Mérida	Vickers Viscount	Unknown	Unknown	0/13	Hijacked to Mexico.	
1 November 1958	(Cuba) Preston	Viscount 755D	CU-T603	W/O	17/20	The aircraft was due to operate an international scheduled Miami–Varadero passenger service as Flight 495, but did not arrive to the destination. It apparently ran out of fuel, crashing into the sea in Nipe Bay, 3 kilometres (1.9 mi) off Preston Airport. The aircraft was apparently hijacked to Preston (now Guatemala, Cuba).	
29 October 1960	(United States) Key West	DC-3	Unknown	Minor	1/37	The aircraft was initially scheduled to fly a Havana–Nueva Gerona passenger service as Flight 905, but it was hijacked shortly after takeoff from José Martí International Airport by the copilot, who forced the captain at gunpoint to fly to Key West, Florida; the air marshal was killed during a shootout. Nine people were involved in the hijacking and all nine requested political asylum in the US along with two additional passengers.	
8 December 1960	(Cuba) Cienfuegos	Unknown	Unknown	Unknown	1/17	Shortly after the aircraft departed Cienfuegos Airport bound for Havana, five hijackers attempted to take control to get it diverted to the United States. A gunfire on board killed one occupant. The aircraft crash-landed.	
15 April 1961	(Cuba) Santiago Airport	DC-3A	CU-T172	W/O	0/0	Destroyed by a United States air raid at the beginning of the Bay of Pigs Invasion.	
15 April 1961	Unknown	DC-3A-228C	CU-T138	W/O	0/0	Destroyed by a United States air raid at the beginning of the Bay of Pigs Invasion.	
9 August 1961	(Cuba) Near Havana	Curtiss C-46	Unknown	Substantial	3/53	Shortly after takeoff from Havana, five hijackers attempted to enter the flight deck. Two guards tried to stop the hijackers and shots were fired, killing the captain, one hijacker and a guard. The co-pilot made an emergency landing in a sugar cane field, collapsing the undercarriage. Four hijackers then escaped.	
27 March 1962	Off Santiago de Cuba	Il-14	CU-T819	W/O	22/22	Crashed into the sea shortly after departing Santiago de Cuba bound for Havana.	
27 March 1966	(Cuba) Havana	Il-18B	CU-T831	Unknown	2	The aircraft was operating a Santiago de Cuba–Havana flight when it was hijacked by the flight engineer and the plane was demanded to be flown to Florida, but the pilot flew the aircraft to Havana instead. When the hijacker saw an Aeroflot aircraft on the tarmac, he realized he had been tricked and shot the pilot dead, and attempted to take off. The copilot shut down the engines. The hijacker jumped out of the aircraft and fled, but was caught days later.	
10 July 1966	(Cuba) near Cienfuegos	Il-18V	CU-T830	W/O	2/93	Force-landed due to multiple engine failures.	
9 February 1967	Mexico City	An-12BP	CU-T827	W/O	10/10	Crashed on approach to Benito Juárez International Airport. The aircraft was completing a Havana–Mexico City cargo service.	
11 July 1971	Unknown	Unknown	Unknown	Unknown	1	Two passengers attempted to hijack the aircraft, operating a Havana–Cienfuegos service. One passenger was killed when a hand grenade detonated.	
14 May 1973	(Cuba) José Martí International Airport	An-24V	CU-T876	W/O	3	Crashed on landing in bad weather due to crew error. The aircraft was completing a Nueva Gerona–Havana passenger service as Flight 707.	
18 March 1976	(Cuba) Near Havana	An-24B	CU-T879	W/O	5/5	Both aircraft were involved in a mid-air collision. The An-24B was on a training flight, while the DC-8 was on a scheduled Montreal–Havana passenger flight as Flight 455. The first aircraft crashed, killing all five occupants on board; the DC-8 landed safely, despite having the outer portion of a wing and an engine sheared off.	
18 March 1976	(Cuba) Near Havana	DC-8-43	CU-T1200	W/O	0/29	Both aircraft were involved in a mid-air collision. The An-24B was on a training flight, while the DC-8 was on a scheduled Montreal–Havana passenger flight as Flight 455. The first aircraft crashed, killing all five occupants on board; the DC-8 landed safely, despite having the outer portion of a wing and an engine sheared off.	
6 October 1976	(Barbados) Bridgetown	DC-8-43	CU-T1201	W/O	73/73	Lost height and crashed into the sea, 8 kilometres (5.0 mi) west of Grantley Adams International Airport, following an explosion minutes after takeoff. The aircraft was due to operate an international scheduled Bridgetown–Kingston passenger service as Flight 455.	
3 February 1980	(Cuba) Baracoa	Yak-40	CU-T1219	W/O	1/37	Crashed on landing at Baracoa Airport.	
13 May 1980	(Cuba) Off Varadero	Il-14	CU-T822 (Note: Also reported as CU-T322.)	W/O	3/3	Entered a spin and crashed during a training flight.	
19 January 1985	(Cuba) San José de las Lajas	Il-18D	CU-T899	W/O	38/38	1985 Cubana de Aviación Ilyushin Il-18 crash — Lost control and crashed while en route an international scheduled Havana–Managua passenger service.	
11 March 1987	(Cuba) Havana	An-24RV	CU-T1262	Unknown	1/48	Before operating a Havana–Nueva Gerona passenger service as Flight 706, the aircraft was hijacked by three passengers who demanded to be flown to the United States. The hijackers struggled with the passengers and in the ensuing chaos, a hand grenade detonated, injuring 13 people. A policeman on board the aircraft shot dead one hijacker and arrested the other two.	
3 September 1989	(Cuba) Havana	Il-62M	CU-T1281	W/O	150/150	Crashed into a residential area shortly after takeoff from José Martí International Airport in adverse weather conditions. All 126 occupants aboard the aircraft died in the accident, along with another 24 people on the ground. The aircraft was due to operate a non-scheduled international Havana–Milan–Cologne passenger service as Flight 9046.	
23 March 1990	Santiago de Cuba	An-26	CU-T1436	W/O	4/46	Overran the runway following an aborted takeoff at Antonio Maceo Airport as Flight 7406.	
24 October 1990	Santiago de Cuba	Yak-40S2	CU-T1202	W/O	11/11 (Note: The number of casualties for this crash varies, depending upon the source: it was stated that the number of occupants was eleven and all of them died, and that there were ten casualties, out of 36 occupants of the aircraft.)	Crashed on approach to Antonio Maceo Airport, 4 kilometres (2.5 mi) short of the runway . The aircraft was completing a domestic non-scheduled Camagüey–Santiago de Cuba passenger service as Flight 2886.	
14 September 1991	Mexico City	Tu-154B-2	CU-T1227	W/O	0/112	Overran the runway on landing at Benito Juárez International Airport. The aircraft was completing an international scheduled Havana–Mexico City passenger service as Flight 464.	
2 January 1992	(Cuba) Varadero	Mi-8	CU-H407	Undamaged	0/34	Commandeered by German Pompa and compatriots, flown to an area outside the base where 30 passengers were picked up, and flown to Tamiami Airport in southern Florida, US, where all crew and passengers sought asylum	
11 July 1997	Santiago de Cuba	An-24RV	CU-T1262	W/O	44/44	Shortly after departing from Antonio Maceo Airport, at 500 feet (150 m), the aircraft banked to the left and descended until it crashed into the sea, 5 kilometres (3.1 mi) off the airport. Due to operate a domestic scheduled Santiago–Havana passenger service as Flight 787.	
29 August 1998	(Ecuador) Quito	Tu-154M	CU-T1264	W/O	80	Aborted takeoff at Mariscal Sucre International Airport, 800 metres (2,600 ft) of the runway end, overrunning it. Seventy occupants of the aircraft lost their lives along with another ten casualties on the ground. Due to operate the first leg of an international scheduled Quito–Guayaquil–Havana passenger service as Flight 389.	
21 December 1999	Guatemala City	DC-10-30	F-GTDI	W/O	18	Inbound from Havana as Flight 1216, the aircraft –leased from AOM French Airlines and operating a non-scheduled service– overran the runway on landing at La Aurora Airport and continued down a slope before coming to rest in a residential area. Sixteen occupants of the aircraft and two people on the ground lost their lives in the accident.	
25 December 1999	(Venezuela) Bejuma	Yak-42D	CU-T1285	W/O	22/22	Crashed on approach to Arturo Michelena International Airport. Was completing an international scheduled Havana–Valencia passenger service as Flight 310.	
14 June 2003	(Cuba) Nueva Gerona	An-24RV	CU-T1295	W/O	0/52	Following touchdown at Rafael Cabrera Airport, the aircraft ran off the runway because of insufficient hydraulic pressure.	
20 April 2008	(Dominican Republic) Santo Domingo	Il-62M	CU-T1283	W/O	0/117	Made an emergency landing at Las Américas International Airport. The aircraft had departed from the same airport bound for Havana on an international scheduled passenger service as Flight 201. At 25,000 feet (7,600 m), an uncontained failure in the inner port engine caused the fuel line for the outer one to get damaged as well. A small fire started, while debris damaged the fuselage and a decompression occurred, prompting the crew to return to the airport of departure. The aircraft landed safely, but the airframe was damaged beyond economical repair.	
18 May 2018	(Cuba) Havana	737-200	XA-UHZ	W/O	112/113	Crashed upon takeoff from José Martí International Airport in Havana, Cuba as a domestic flight Flight 0972 from Havana to Holguin. There were 107 passengers and 6 crew aboard, the latter being of Mexican nationality, due arrangement (wet lease) with Global Air, owner of the aircraft. The investigation found that the pilots miscalculated the aircraft's weight.	

== See also ==
- List of Cuba–United States aircraft hijackings
