= Aguirre =

Aguirre may refer to:

== Media ==
- Aguirre, the Wrath of God, a 1972 film by Werner Herzog, loosely based on the career of Lope de Aguirre (1510–1561)
- Aguirre (soundtrack), the soundtrack to Herzog's film, composed and performed by Popol Vuh

== Places ==
- Aguirre, Salinas, Puerto Rico, a barrio in the municipality of Salinas, Puerto Rico
- Aguirre Department, Santiago del Estero Province, Argentina
- Aguirre, Venezuela, a village in Carabobo state, Venezuela
- Lo Aguirre, a closed copper mine near Santiago, Chile

== People ==
- Aguirre (surname)
- Lope de Aguirre

== Other uses ==
- BAP Aguirre, several Peruvian Navy ships commissioned between 1951 and 2005

== See also ==
- Agirre, a surname
