= Cubana de Aviación Flight 0972 =

2018 aviation accident in Cuba

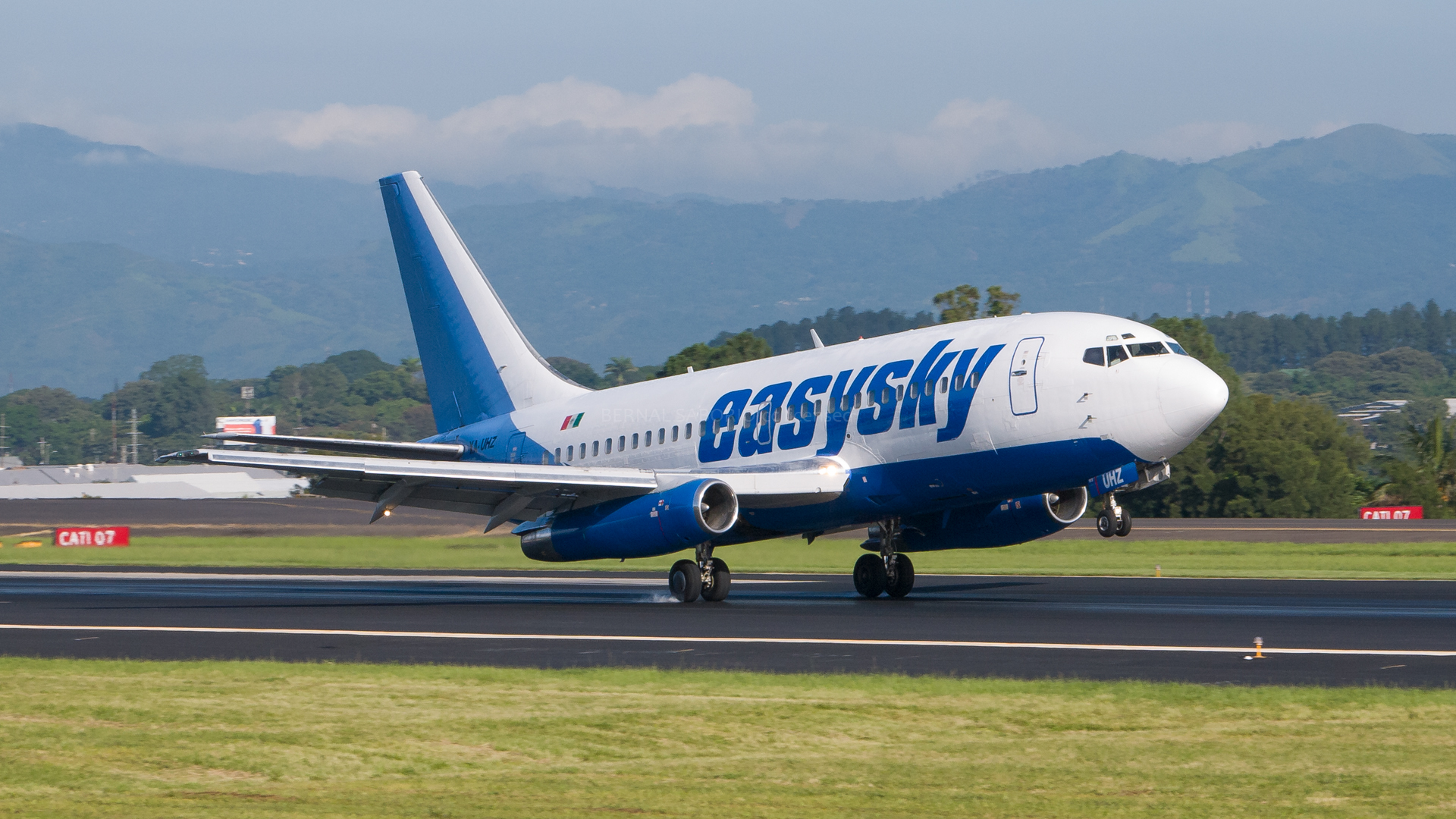
- XA-UHZ, the aircraft involved in the accident, seen in 2016 while operating with EasySky

Accident
- Date: 18 May 2018
- Summary: Crashed during climb out; weight miscalculation and pilot error
- Site: José Martí International Airport, Havana, Cuba; 22°59′29″N 82°23′28″W

Aircraft
- Aircraft type: Boeing 737-201 Adv.
- Operator: Global Air on behalf of Cubana de Aviación
- ICAO flight No.: DMJ0972
- Call sign: DELTA MIKE JULIET 0972
- Registration: XA-UHZ
- Flight origin: José Martí International Airport; Havana, Cuba
- Destination: Frank País Airport; Holguín, Cuba
- Occupants: 113
- Passengers: 107
- Crew: 6
- Fatalities: 112
- Injuries: 1
- Survivors: 1

Cubana de Aviación Flight 0972 was a scheduled domestic flight operated by Mexican charter airline Global Air on behalf of Cubana de Aviación, from José Martí International Airport, Havana, Cuba, to Frank País Airport in Holguín, Cuba. On 18 May 2018, the 39-year-old Boeing 737-200 operating the route crashed shortly after takeoff, near Santiago de las Vegas, 19 kilometres (12 mi; 10 nmi) from Havana city centre. Of those on board, 112 died and one passenger survived with critical injuries. There were initially four survivors, but three of them later died at a local hospital. Most of the passengers on board were Cuban nationals, although the crew was entirely Mexican.

The incident was investigated by Cuban safety investigators, with assistance from the United States and Mexico. While the Federal Aviation Administration has no official jurisdiction in Cuba, their assistance was voluntary and welcomed by Cuban officials due to the local investigators' general lack of experience with American-built aircraft. Additional assistance was provided by Mexico, where the aircraft was registered, and also where the airline and flight crew that owned and operated the aircraft were based. In September 2019, the multinational investigation determined that the aircraft's centre of gravity was outside the permissible limits, and the pilots were unsuccessful in an attempt to remedy issues related to the plane's loading/weight imbalance.

== Aircraft ==
The aircraft was a leased Boeing 737-201 Adv. aircraft, operated by Mexican charter airline Global Air (Aerolíneas Damojh, S.A. de C.V.), on a scheduled domestic flight from Havana to Holguín on behalf of Cubana de Aviación. The aircraft was manufactured in August 1979, and after being owned by a number of different airlines, it was acquired in July 2011 by Global Air, who began to operate the plane for Cubana de Aviación in 2018.

A statement by Global Air said that its aircraft had passed a November 2017 Mexican government inspection and that it was up-to-date with its permits to operate and lease aircraft.

== Passengers and crew ==
The all-Mexican crew consisted of two pilots and four flight attendants, and there were 107 passengers on board. Mexico's Secretariat of Communications and Transportation released a statement identifying the crew members.

The captain was 53-year-old Jorge Nuñez Santos, who had logged 16,655 flight hours. The first officer was 40-year-old Miguel Arreola Ramírez, who had 2,314 flight hours.

== Accident ==
Flight 0972 was on a domestic flight to Frank País Airport in Holguín, eastern Cuba. It was carrying a total of 113 people – 107 passengers and six crew members. All but five of the passengers were Cuban nationals and all of the flight crew were Mexican.

The aircraft crashed close to the airport at 12:08 pm, shortly after taking off. Eyewitnesses said that the plane made an unusual turn after leaving the runway; one witness on the ground said that she saw one of the plane's engines on fire. The plane crashed into train tracks and a farm, and a fire erupted from the wreckage. No one on the ground was injured. First responders, including firefighters and emergency medical crews, rushed to the scene to assist with the rescue efforts.

Security camera footage of the accident was released on 25 May, showing the moment the aircraft crashed, from a nearby location.

== Response ==
President Miguel Díaz-Canel, Health Minister Roberto Morales, and other local authorities arrived at the site to observe and monitor the rescue efforts. Family and relatives of those aboard also gathered at the site and were later taken to the airport.

The country declared an official period of mourning from 6 am on 19 May to 12 midnight on 20 May, with flags to fly at half-mast outside government and military installations.

Relatives were called to Havana to identify the dead, with the National Revolutionary Police escorting them to clear the way.

== Victims ==
All but four of the 113 people on board perished in the crash; however, three of the four survivors later died in hospital. One passenger who initially survived the crash died three days later, on 21 May, and another died on 25 May. In total, 112 people, including all crew members, were killed in the accident. A Cuban national remained as the sole survivor of the crash. She suffered from severe burns, fragmentation of memory, a cervical spinal injury that left her paraplegic, amputation of her left lower leg, among other injuries and complications that required prolonged hospitalization. She was released from the hospital for the first time in March 2019.

Nationality	Passengers	Crew	Total	Fatalities
Cuba	102	0	102	101
Mexico	1	6	7	7
Argentina	2	0	2	2
Sahrawi Republic (Note: Includes 1 passenger with dual Sahrawi Republic-Spain citizenship.)	2	0	2	2
Total	107	6	113	112

The president of Cuba's Church of the Nazarene confirmed that ten pastors from the church, and their spouses, were among the passengers that were killed in the crash. Flight 0972 is the second deadliest aircraft accident in Cuba, surpassed only by the crash of Cubana de Aviación Flight 9046 in 1989, which killed 150 people. The previous major commercial aircraft accident in Cuba was Aero Caribbean Flight 883 in 2010.

== Investigation ==
President Miguel Díaz-Canel announced that a special commission had been formed to find the cause of the crash. Both the United States' National Transportation Safety Board and Federal Aviation Administration have stated they would be able to offer assistance in the investigation, if requested. The aircraft manufacturer Boeing said it was ready to send a technical team to Cuba "as permitted under US law and at the direction of the US National Transportation Safety Board and Cuban authorities".

Transport Minister Adel Yzquierdo reported the recovery of the flight data recorder from the crash site on 19 May. The cockpit voice recorder was located on 24 May. Both were sent to the National Transportation Safety Board for analysis.

On 19 May, the Mexican government announced that its National Civil Aviation Authority (DGAC) was to begin an operational audit of Global Air to see if the airline was in compliance with regulations, and subsequently, on 21 May, the Mexican authorities temporarily suspended Global Air's operations.

In the days following the crash, allegations were made by former workers and Cubana employees relating to Global Air's airworthiness, maintenance and safety record. Incidents involving the Guyana Civil Aviation Authority and Chilean Directorate General of Civil Aviation were reported: in 2017, for instance, XA-UHZ had been banned from Guyanese airspace due to its crew overloading the plane with luggage and stowing it improperly.

Ovidio Martínez López, a pilot for Cubana for over 40 years until he retired in 2012, wrote in a Facebook post that a plane rented from the Mexican company by Cubana briefly dropped off radar while over the city of Santa Clara in 2010 or 2011, triggering an immediate response by Cuban aviation security officials. As a result, Cuban officials suspended a captain and co-pilot for "serious technical knowledge issues", and Cuba's Aviation Security authority issued a formal recommendation that Cubana stop renting planes and crews from Global Air, Martínez wrote.

On 17 July, the aircraft owner Global Air released a statement that, following studies of the aircraft flight recorders by international experts, the cause of the accident had been determined as pilot error, explaining that the pilots had climbed at too high a rate, resulting in the aircraft stalling. Mexico's civil aviation authority (DGAC) said it would not lift a suspension of Global Air's operations that the company was fighting to have removed, and that its counterpart in Cuba, the Civil Aviation Institute of Cuba (IACC), which was leading the investigation, had yet to issue any findings. Mexico's pilots union, Aviation Pilots Union Association (Spanish: Asociación Sindical de Pilotos Aviadores; ASPA), said Global Air was "irresponsible" in releasing its statement before the investigation had been concluded, and that it did not take into account factors such as distribution of weight on the aircraft or possible equipment failures. ASPA's spokesman, Mauricio Aguilera, told domestic news outlet Milenio, "They're just looking to defend their interests."

On 16 May 2019, the Cuban Institute of Civil Aeronautics released a statement which said "The most probable cause of the accident were the actions of the crew and their errors in the calculations of weight and balance that led to loss of control of the plane and its fall during the takeoff phase." They point out that the number of passengers in the forward cabin was given as 62 when it had capacity for 54, and the weight in the cargo compartments was "incorrect". Calculations also show that the fuel weight at take-off exceeded the plan by some 5,000 pounds (2,300 kg).

The load sheet presented to the crew put the take-off weight at about 99,900 pounds (45,300 kg), but recalculation by investigators produced a figure of just over 104,000 pounds (47,000 kg), while the zero-fuel weight was wrong because the weight of luggage was lower than planned.

=== Final report ===
IACC published its final report on the crash on 12 September 2019. IACC determined that the most probable cause of the crash "was the collapse of the aircraft as a result of its entry into abnormal positions immediately after liftoff during the takeoff, which led to the loss of control of the plane due to a chain of errors, with a predominance of the human factor". The report stated that the contributing human factors to this were "mostly due to inconsistencies in the crew's training, errors in weight and balance calculations and the low operational standards that were revealed during the flight", according to the translations by OnCuba News and Havana Times.

== See also ==
- Cubana de Aviación accidents and incidents
- List of accidents and incidents involving the Boeing 737
- List of aviation accidents and incidents with a sole survivor
