= Flight 56 =

Flight 56 or Flight 056 may refer to:

- Air Afrique Flight 056, hijacked on 24 July 1987
- Bristow Helicopters Flight 56C, crashed on 19 January 1995
- Azerbaijan Airlines Flight 56, crashed on 5 December 1995
- Med Jets Flight 056, crashed on 31 January 2025
