= Vicente Gerbasi =

Venezuelan poet

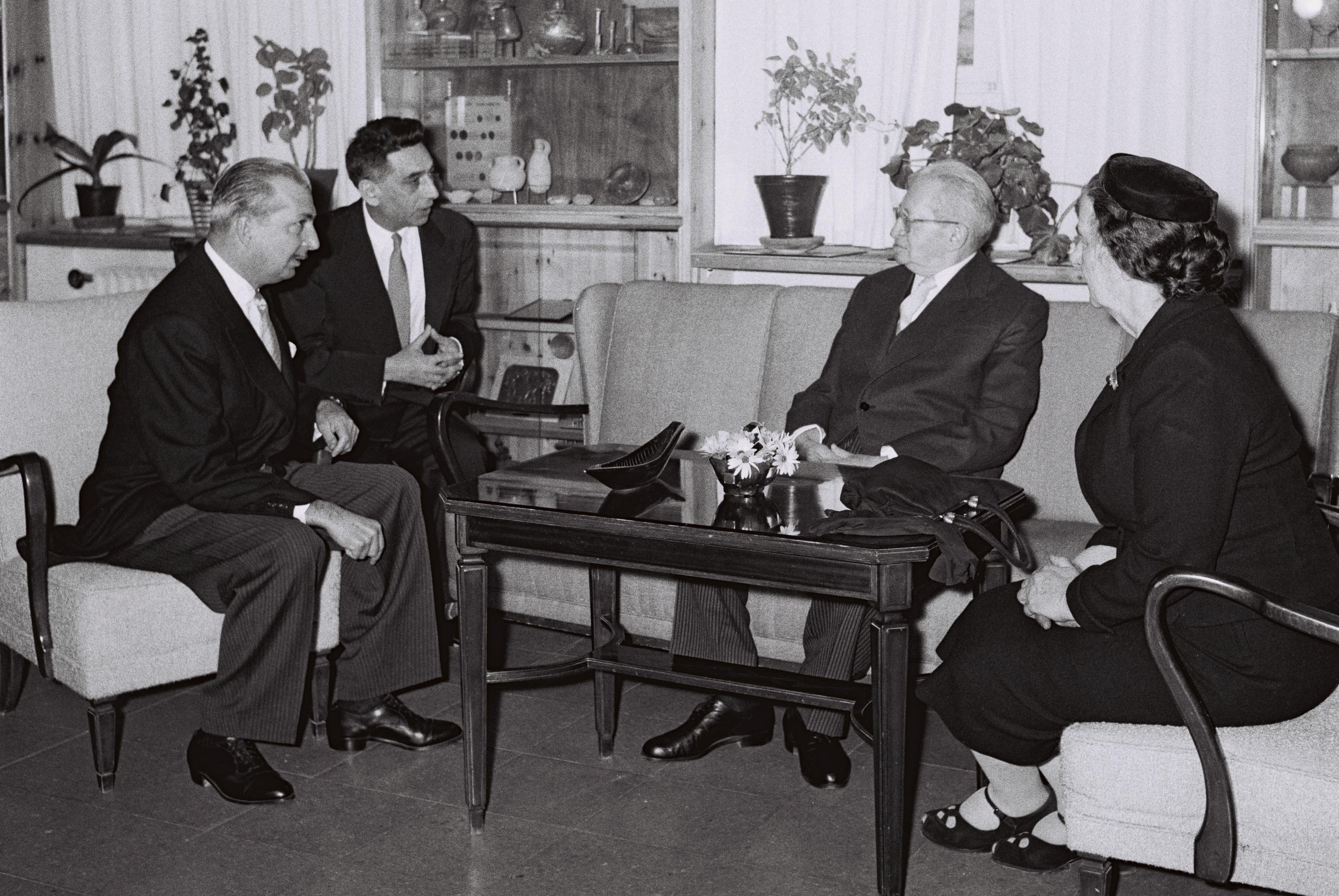
Ambassador Vicente Gerbasi after presenting his credentials to the President of Israel Yitzhak Ben-Zvi, with Golda Meir, February 18, 1960

Vicente Gerbasi (June 2, 1913 in Canaobo, Carabobo – December 28, 1992 in Caracas) was a representative poet of Venezuelan 20th century.

== Biography ==
Vicente Gerbasi was born in Canoabo, a small city in Carabobo in Northern Venezuela as a child of Italian immigrants. He was part of the "Grupo Viernes", and published many books of poetry; in later years, many were published by Monte Ávila Editores.

Gerbasi was also ambassador of Venezuela for many years: Haiti (1959), Israel (1960–1964), Denmark and Norway, Poland (1969–1971).

He received an honorary doctorate from the University of Carabobo in 1984. In 1986 Biblioteca Ayacucho published his Obra Poética.

== Works ==
- Vigilia del náufrago, 1937
- Bosque doliente, 1940
- Liras, 1943
- Poemas de la noche y de la tierra, 1943
- Mi padre, el inmigrante, 1945
- Tres nocturnos, 1947
- Poemas, 1947
- Los espacios cálidos, 1952
- Círculos del trueno, 1953
- La rama del relámpago, 1953
- Tirano de sombra y fuego, 1955
- Por arte del sol, 1958
- Olivos de eternidad, 1961
- Retumba como un sótano del cielo, 1977
- Edades perdidas, 1981
- Los colores ocultos, 1985
- Un día muy distante, 1987
- El solitario viento de las hojas, 1990
- Iniciación a la intemperie, 1990
