= USS Waterman =

Cannon-class destroyer escort

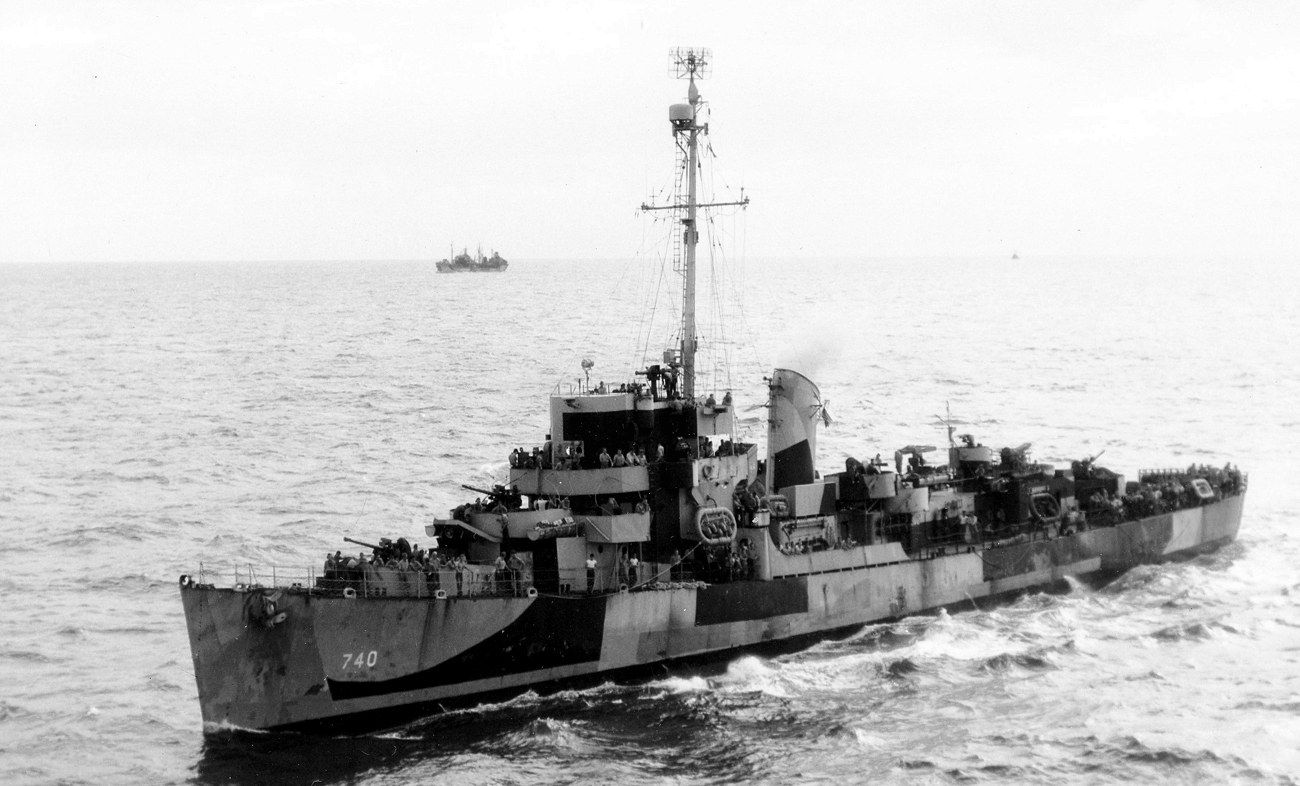

History

United States
- Name: USS Waterman
- Namesake: Andrew Kenneth Waterman
- Builder: Western Pipe and Steel Company, Los Angeles, California
- Laid down: 24 February 1943
- Launched: 20 June 1943
- Commissioned: 30 November 1943
- Decommissioned: 31 May 1946
- Stricken: 18 April 1952
- Honors and awards: 8 battle stars (World War II)
- Fate: Transferred to Peru, 21 February 1952

Peru
- Name: BAP Aguirre (D-2)
- Acquired: 21 February 1952
- Reclassified: DE-2, 1959; DE-62, 1960
- Fate: Sunk as target ship, 1974

General characteristics
- Class & type: Cannon-class destroyer escort
- Displacement: 1,240 long tons (1,260 t) standard; 1,620 long tons (1,646 t) full
- Length: 306 ft (93 m) o/a; 300 ft (91 m) w/l
- Beam: 36 ft 10 in (11.23 m)
- Draft: 11 ft 8 in (3.56 m)
- Propulsion: 4 × GM Mod. 16-278A diesel engines with electric drive, 6,000 shp (4,474 kW), 2 screws
- Speed: 21 knots (39 km/h; 24 mph)
- Range: 10,800 nmi (20,000 km) at 12 kn (22 km/h; 14 mph)
- Complement: 15 officers and 201 enlisted
- Armament: 3 × single Mk.22 3"/50 caliber guns; 1 × twin 40 mm Mk.1 AA gun; 8 × 20 mm Mk.4 AA guns; 3 × 21-inch (533 mm) torpedo tubes; 1 × Hedgehog Mk.10 anti-submarine mortar (144 rounds); 8 × Mk.6 depth charge projectors; 2 × Mk.9 depth charge tracks

USS Waterman (DE-740) was a Cannon-class destroyer escort in service with the United States Navy from 1943 to 1946. She was sold to Peru in 1952, where she served as BAP Aguirre (D-2/DE-62) until being sunk as a target, in 1974.

== Namesake ==
Andrew Kenneth Waterman was born on 20 December 1913 in Lewis County, Kentucky. He enlisted in the United States Navy on 21 November 1932 at Buffalo, New York. After instruction at the Naval Training Station, Newport, Rhode Island, he served successive tours of sea duty on the USS Nitro, USS New Mexico and USS Relief before he underwent aviation training at the Fleet Air Base, Coco Solo, Panama Canal Zone. After he attained the rate of aviation machinist's mate 3d class in December 1935 and extended his enlistment in November 1936, he served with Utility Squadron 1 into mid-1939. Transferred to Patrol Squadron 21 (VP-21) in August 1939, he joined that unit in time to make the transpacific flight from Hawaii to the Philippines of VP-21's PBY-4's to reinforce the Asiatic Fleet's patrols out of Cavite and Olongapo. For his role in that movement he received a commendation from Commander, Patrol Wing (PatWing) 2, Rear Admiral Arthur L. Bristol, Jr., on 2 October 1939. The Admiral praised Waterman's "through planning, attention to detail, and exceptional ability" that indicated a "high degree of efficiency" instrumental in the success of that important mission.

Transferred to VP-1 in September 1940, PatWing 10 flew reconnaissance and patrol missions from Cavite's Sangley Point seaplane base or from tender-supported Olongapo up to the outbreak of war with Japan on 8 December 1941. Before midnight on 26 December 1941, a six-plane attack group of PBY's from VP-101 (the redesignated VP-1) departed their advance base at Ambon, Netherlands East Indies, and set course for the Philippines. The PBYs were slated to hit Japanese shipping reportedly in Jolo harbor, in the Sulu Archipelago. Waterman by now an aviation machinist's mate 1st class, was flying as waist gunner and first mechanic in the PBY-4 flown by Ens. Elwyn L. Christman. Soon after the PBY's arrived over Jolo Harbor, antiaircraft fire from shore emplacements greeted them with gunfire assessed by Ens. Christman as "very accurate." Gunfire from the enemy ships below proved less troublesome, but soon the guns stopped firing when attacking Japanese fighter aircraft hove into view. Waterman and Aviation Machinist's Mate 2nd Class Joseph Bangust, the waist gunners, stood by their machine guns and downed the first attacker. While in a 60-degree dive aimed at a cruiser below, Christman released his bombs at 5,000 feet before heading the lumbering PBY westward to clear the area. One fighter, however, pursued doggedly. In the ensuing running fight the fighter's cannon shells tore into the plane's gasoline tank; and the volatile fuel spilled from the ruptured area. On another pass, the fighter's fire ignited the gasoline and set the Catalina ablaze. Christman headed for the water to land and abandon ship; two men, Radiomen 2 Class Landers and Bangust, bailed out at 300 feet (91 m) while Christman and his second and third pilots rode the plane down. Waterman had been mortally wounded, probably in the fighter's last pass. The burning PBY made a landing, and the remaining living crewman abandoned the aircraft and struck out for shore. There was no time to extricate Waterman's body from the blazing Catalina. He was posthumously awarded the Navy Cross.

== History ==
The ship was laid down on 24 February 1943 at San Pedro, Los Angeles, by the Western Pipe and Steel Company; launched on 20 June 1943; sponsored by Mrs. June M. Waterman, the widow of Aviation Machinist's Mate 1st Class Waterman; and commissioned on 30 November 1943.

=== 1944 ===
After shakedown out of San Diego, California, and post-shakedown availability at her builder's yard, Waterman departed San Pedro, California, on 12 February 1944 and proceeded independently to Pearl Harbor, where she arrived six days later. Once in Hawaiian waters, the new escort vessel underwent further training in anti-submarine warfare and gunnery.

Waterman departed Pearl Harbor on 6 March and screened the escort carrier Nassau (CVE-16) as she ferried replacement aircraft, passengers, and cargo to Kwajalein, Majuro, Tarawa, and Makin in the Marshalls and Gilberts. The destroyer escort returned to Pearl Harbor on 24 March.

Continuing in her role as an escort vessel, Waterman sailed from Hawaiian waters on 9 April, bound again for the Marshalls in company with Bowers (DE-637) and escorting Convoy 4152-A which was made up of merchant tankers. Waterman arrived at Majuro one week later and then performed local escort missions out of that base through May.

On 1 June, Waterman joined Task Group (TG) 50.17, a fleet service group made up of vital support ships – particularly fleet oilers, tugs, ammunition ships, supply ships, and the like – that allowed the fast carrier task forces to remain at sea for prolonged periods of time. Those ships provided the carriers and their escorts with the vital necessities of life – food, fuel, ammunition, mail, etc. – anything the fleet needed to keep up the pressure on the Japanese.

Waterman's first assignment in that role was operating in support of the Marianas operation. She departed Majuro on 6 June and protected the task group for a fortnight before completing her mission at Eniwetok on the 20th. She then steamed to the Marianas and picked up an oiler at Saipan – while fighting was still in progress ashore – and screened her back to the Marshalls.

Underway again from Eniwetok on 26 July, Waterman rendezvoused with the fleet service group east of the Marianas and protected the oilers as they refueled the ships supporting the landings on Guam.

After returning to the Marshalls, the destroyer escort sailed from Eniwetok on 26 August, bound for the Admiralties, and arrived at Manus five days later. Soon thereafter, she returned to the open sea with a Service Force unit, TU 30.8.7, supporting the invasion of the Western Carolines. During that time, the destroyer escort operated west of the Philippine Islands, supporting carrier strikes. Waterman – operating out of Manus through September – weighed anchor on 4 October and stood out to sea, escorting the fleet service group to points east of the Philippines, where they replenished carriers launching air strikes smashing Japanese positions on the island of Leyte.

After escorting Service Force units which were supporting the Leyte landings, Waterman operated between 2 November and 23 December with TG 30.8 – the task group servicing carrier forces operating east of the Philippine Islands; planes from those fast carriers largely neutralized Japanese air and sea power in the Philippines and Formosa.

While operating with TG 30.8, Waterman encountered the worst weather of her career – the infamous Typhoon Cobra of 18 December 1944. For approximately 36 hours, the fierce storm battered Admiral Halsey's fleet – large and small ships alike. Winds of 120 knots (220 km/h; 140 mph) threw almost solid clouds of spume and spray and whipped up waves of about 80 feet in height, making life aboard Waterman decidedly "uncomfortable." Upon occasion, the ship rolled as much as 65 degrees. As her commanding officer recounted: "This day was a never to be forgotten one and was indelibly impressed in the minds of the crew."

Before the typhoon had spent itself, three ships – all lightly loaded destroyers, low on fuel – had been sunk and others damaged. On 23 December, two days before Christmas, Waterman steamed back to Ulithi "somewhat battered but in much better condition than a majority of the larger ships."

=== 1945 ===
One week later, the destroyer escort was at sea again, bound for Guam. From 4 January 1945 to 3 March, Waterman saw continuous service screening the fleet service group. She spent much of January supporting the occupation of Luzon from the fueling areas east of the Philippines and, in February, escorted the vital auxiliaries to a rendezvous with the fleet that soon commenced the pre-invasion bombardment of Iwo Jima.

While thus engaged, Waterman distinguished herself. On 17 February, an internal explosion ripped through the forward section of the oiler Patuxent (AO-44), leaving gaping holes in her bow and fires that raged over the forward part of the ship, endangering part of the cargo of volatile aviation gas. Waterman promptly left her screening station and was the first of two escorts to come alongside and lend a hand. She closed the endangered ship from one side while Dewey (DD-349) approached her from the other. The destroyer escort's repair parties, operating under extremely hazardous conditions, streamed thousands of gallons of water on Patuxent's blaze and finally extinguished it. For his part in directing the destroyer escort's effort, Lt. Comdr. J. H. Stahle, USNR, the ship's commanding officer, received the Bronze Star Medal.

After upkeep and logistics back at Ulithi, Waterman departed the Carolines on 22 March for a fueling area east of Okinawa. During the first two weeks of April, Waterman escorted Attu (CVE-102) as she ferried replacement planes to the fast carrier task forces on two round trips between Okinawa and Guam.

For the remainder of the war in the Pacific, Waterman screened Fleet Service Force units steaming a few hundred miles off the Japanese homeland while the fleet's carriers, battleships, and cruisers carried out devastating attacks on the enemy's very doorstep.

On 21 August, less than a week after Japan capitulated, Waterman was assigned to TG 35.80, a special support group set up to enter Tokyo Bay as part of the initial occupation force. With their "battle colors" flying, she and Kyne (DE-744) – the first destroyer escorts to reach Sagami Wan – entered that body of water just southwest of the erstwhile enemy's capital city of Tokyo on 28 August and dropped anchor less than a mile off shore from the town of Katase. On 31 August, she moved into Tokyo Bay proper and, two days later, hauled down her "battle flag" as surrender terms were signed on board the battleship USS Missouri.

On 4 September, Waterman was assigned to TG 30.6, whose duty it was to evacuate Allied prisoners of war (POW's) from nearby prison camps. That afternoon, the destroyer escort entered the harbor at Yokohama and transported POW's to nearby hospital ships, receiving ships, and Kizarazu airfield. Waterman continued that work of mercy until 10 September, when she departed the Tokyo area with TU 30.6.3—four LSM's and sister ship Weaver (DE-741) – bound for Shiogama, on the eastern coast of Honshū, through which port the POW's from the Sendai camp were being evacuated.

The following morning, Waterman entered Shiogama harbor and joined other units of TG 30.6 who were already in the process of evacuating the Allied POW's there. On 14 September, the destroyer escort sailed for Kamaishi, arriving there the following morning for further evacuation of POW's.

Upon completion of that operation, TG 30.6 returned to Tokyo Bay where it was dissolved; Waterman was assigned to escort duties with TG 16.5 (of Service Squadron 6) for duty. In that role, the destroyer escort remained moored in Yokosuka harbor from 19 to 29 September.

On the afternoon of 29 September, Waterman received homeward-bound orders after 20 months of duty in the Pacific war zone; and she stood out of Tokyo Bay on 2 October.

After steaming via Pearl Harbor, she arrived at San Pedro, California, on 20 October and remained there until 6 November, when she got underway for the Panama Canal Zone and Philadelphia, Pennsylvania. Arriving there on 22 November, the ship remained at Philadelphia until 10 December, undergoing availability. Soon thereafter, Waterman shifted to Green Cove Springs, Florida, where she was laid-up in reserve at the Atlantic Reserve Fleet berthing area on 31 May 1946.

=== Transfer to Peru ===
Waterman never again saw active service under the Stars and Stripes. She was transferred to the government of Peru on 21 February 1952 under the Mutual Defense Assistance Pact (MDAP) and was struck from the Navy List on 18 April of that same year.

Arriving in Peruvian waters on 24 May 1952, Waterman was renamed Aguirre and classified as a destroyer, D-2. Reclassified a destroyer escort, DE-2 in 1959 and DE-62 in 1960, Aguirre served the Peruvian Navy until she was disposed of in 1974 by being used as a target during an Exocet missile test.

== Awards ==
Waterman received eight battle stars for her World War II service.
