= Izagirre =

Izaguirre is a surname of Basque origin with roots in the Basque Country. It is a variant of the surname Eyzaguirre.

The name may refer to:

- Gorka Izagirre (born 1987), Spanish cyclist, brother of Ion
- Ion Izagirre (born 1989), Spanish cyclist, brother of Gorka
- Koldo Izagirre (born 1953), Spanish writer
