= Thairo Estrada =

Venezuelan baseball player (born 1996)

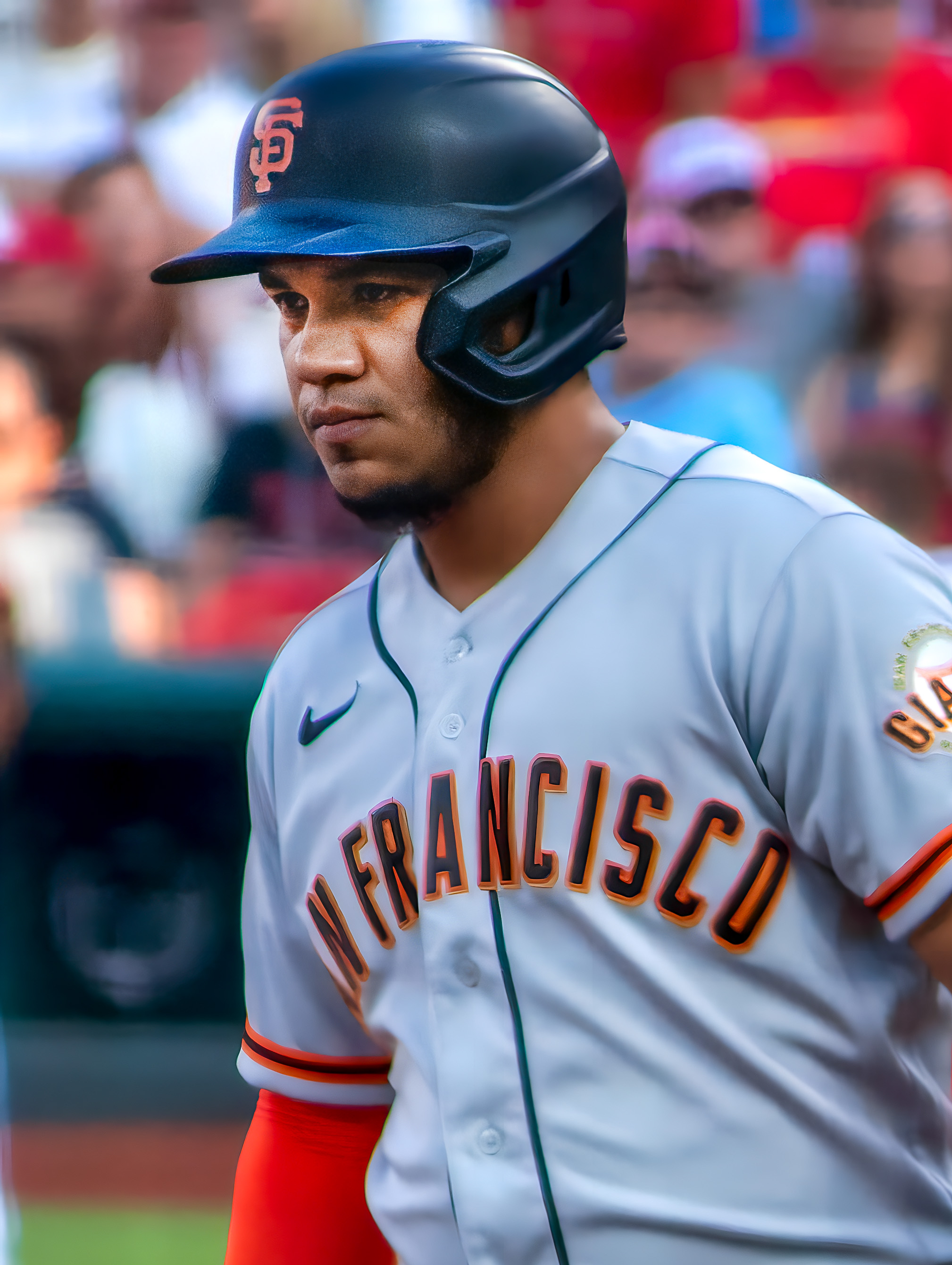
- Estrada with the Giants in 2023

Saraperos de Saltillo – No. 29
- Second baseman
- Born: February 22, 1996 (age 30); Bejuma, Venezuela
- Bats: Right Throws: Right

MLB debut
- April 21, 2019, for the New York Yankees

MLB statistics (through 2025 season)
- Batting average: .251
- Home runs: 51
- Runs batted in: 216
- Stats at Baseball Reference

Teams
- New York Yankees (2019–2020); San Francisco Giants (2021–2024); Colorado Rockies (2025)

Thairo Jose Estrada Villegas (born February 22, 1996) is a Venezuelan professional baseball second baseman for the Saraperos de Saltillo of the Mexican League. He has previously played in Major League Baseball (MLB) for the New York Yankees, San Francisco Giants, and Colorado Rockies.

Estrada signed with the Yankees as an international free agent in 2012. He was shot in early 2018 by robbers, with his recovery delaying the start of his season, in which he played with a bullet still lodged in his hip. He made his MLB debut in 2019 with the Yankees.

== Early life ==
Thairo Jose Estrada Villegas was born on February 22, 1996, in Bejuma, Venezuela.

== Professional career ==
=== New York Yankees (2012-2020) ===
==== Minor leagues ====
Estrada signed with the New York Yankees as an international free agent on August 2, 2012, receiving a $49,000 signing bonus. He made his professional debut in 2013 with the Rookie-level Gulf Coast League (GCL) Yankees and spent the whole season there, batting .278/.350/.432 with five triples, two home runs, 8 hit by pitch, and 17 runs batted in (RBI) in 176 at bats over 50 games. At 17, he was one of the youngest players in the GCL, 2.6 years younger than the average player in the league. Baseball America rated him the 20th-best player in the league.

Estrada played 2014 with the GCL Yankees and Low-A Staten Island Yankees (and was 3 years younger than the average New York–Penn League player). He batted a combined .272/.337/.309 in 81 at-bats over 23 games, with his season cut short by a leg injury he suffered while running the bases in July.

Estrada played in 2015 with Staten Island. He slashed .267/.338/.360 with two home runs and 23 RBI in 247 at-bats over 63 games, and was named a league mid-season All Star.

Estrada then played in 2016 for the Single-A Charleston RiverDogs of the South Atlantic League and the High-A Tampa Yankees of the Florida State League (where Estrada was 2.8 years younger than the average player in the league). He batted a combined .290/.346/.391 with eight home runs, 49 RBI, and a career-high 18 stolen bases in 495 at-bats over 118 total games between the two affiliates and was named an MiLB Organization All Star.

Estrada spent 2017 with the Double-A Trenton Thunder, and was 3.2 years younger than the average player in the Eastern League. He batted .301 (6th in the league)/.353/.392 with 72 runs (3rd), four triples (7th), six home runs, nine hit-by-pitch (6th), and 48 RBI in 495 at-bats over 122 games, with a low strikeout rate of 10.3%. He was the 7th-youngest player in the league to start the season. He was named a league mid-season and postseason All-Star and an MiLB Organization All-Star.

On November 20, 2017, the Yankees added Estrada to their 40-man roster to protect him from the Rule 5 draft. He then played for the Scottsdale Scorpions of the Arizona Fall League, batting .342/.381/.430 in 79 at-bats. He was named to the AFL All-Prospect Team, and named an AFL Rising Star. Baseball America rated him the Yankees' #9 prospect. MLB.com rated him the Yankees' #8 prospect, and assessed his defense as follows: "there's no question that Estrada is a big league shortstop. He covers a lot of ground thanks to his smooth actions and keen instincts, and he has the plus arm to make all of the throws. He's also an asset at second and third base, and he's athletic enough to handle the outfield if asked."

In January 2018, while in his hometown in Venezuela, Estrada was shot in his right hip by robbers in a robbery attempt. Doctors who performed surgery upon him were unable to remove the bullet from his hip, but he was cleared to play with the small caliber bullet lodged in his hip; it was only removed in July six months later, in the United States.

After a delayed start to his season as he missed spring training, Estrada suffered a season-ending lower back injury in June 2018. He played in 18 regular season games in the minor leagues for Tampa and the Triple-A Scranton/Wilkes-Barre RailRiders of the International League combined, batting .192/.210/.231 in 78 at-bats. Estrada played for the Glendale Desert Dogs of the Arizona Fall League after the regular season, batting .238/.282/.263 in 80 at-bats.

==== Major leagues ====
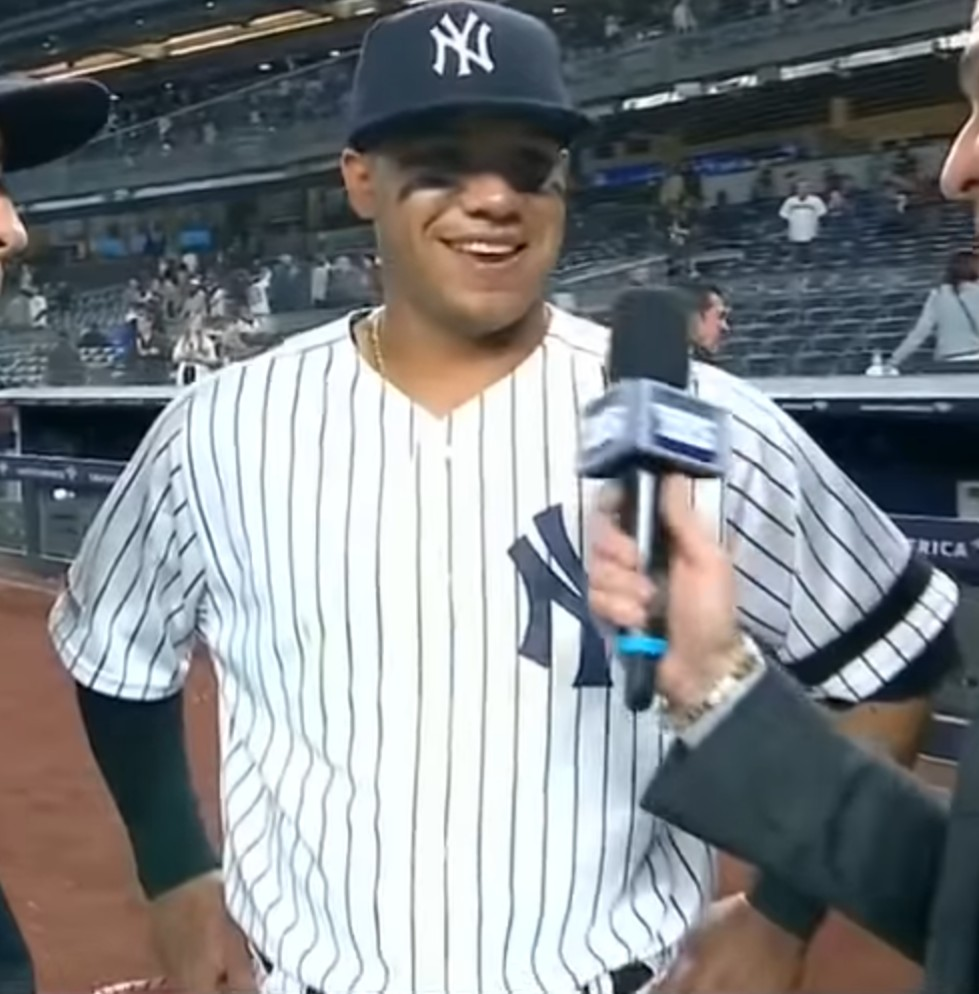
Estrada talk about his first career home run.

The Yankees promoted Estrada to the major leagues on April 4, 2019, but optioned him back to Scranton/Wilkes-Barre on April 6 without Estrada appearing in a major league game. He was again promoted to the Yankees on April 21 and made his major league debut that day. He laid down a sacrifice bunt that set up a walk-off single by Austin Romine. He recorded his first two major league hits on April 23. In 64 at bats for the Yankees he batted .250/.294/.438. For the Yankees, he played 17 games at second base, 9 at shortstop, and 2 each in left field and right field. In Triple-A, he batted .266/.313/.452 with 8 home runs in 241 at-bats, playing 33 games at shortstop, 24 at second base, and 2 at third base.

In his minor league career through 2019, Estrada had played 225 games at shortstop, 161 games at second base, and 52 games at third base.

In 2020 for the Yankees, Estrada batted .167/.231/.229 with one home run and three RBI in 48 at bats across 26 games, playing 20 games at second base, 6 games at third base, and 3 games at shortstop.

On April 6, 2021, Estrada was designated for assignment following the acquisition of Rougned Odor.

=== San Francisco Giants (2021–2024) ===
On April 11, 2021, the Yankees traded Estrada to the San Francisco Giants for cash considerations. Estrada played first for the Sacramento River Cats of the Triple-A West, and batted .385 (4th in the league at the time of his call-up)/.448(9th)/.609 with 12 doubles (10th) in 156 at bats, while striking out only 14% of the time. He played 26 games at shortstop, seven at second base, two at third base, and one in left field.

He was called up to the Giants on June 6, following an injury to third baseman Evan Longoria, who had collided with shortstop Brandon Crawford. In Estrada's debut with the Giants on July 2 against the Arizona Diamondbacks, he went 3-for-5 with five RBIs, a double, and a grand slam. Crawford's oblique injury in July shifted Estrada to start at shortstop in his place.

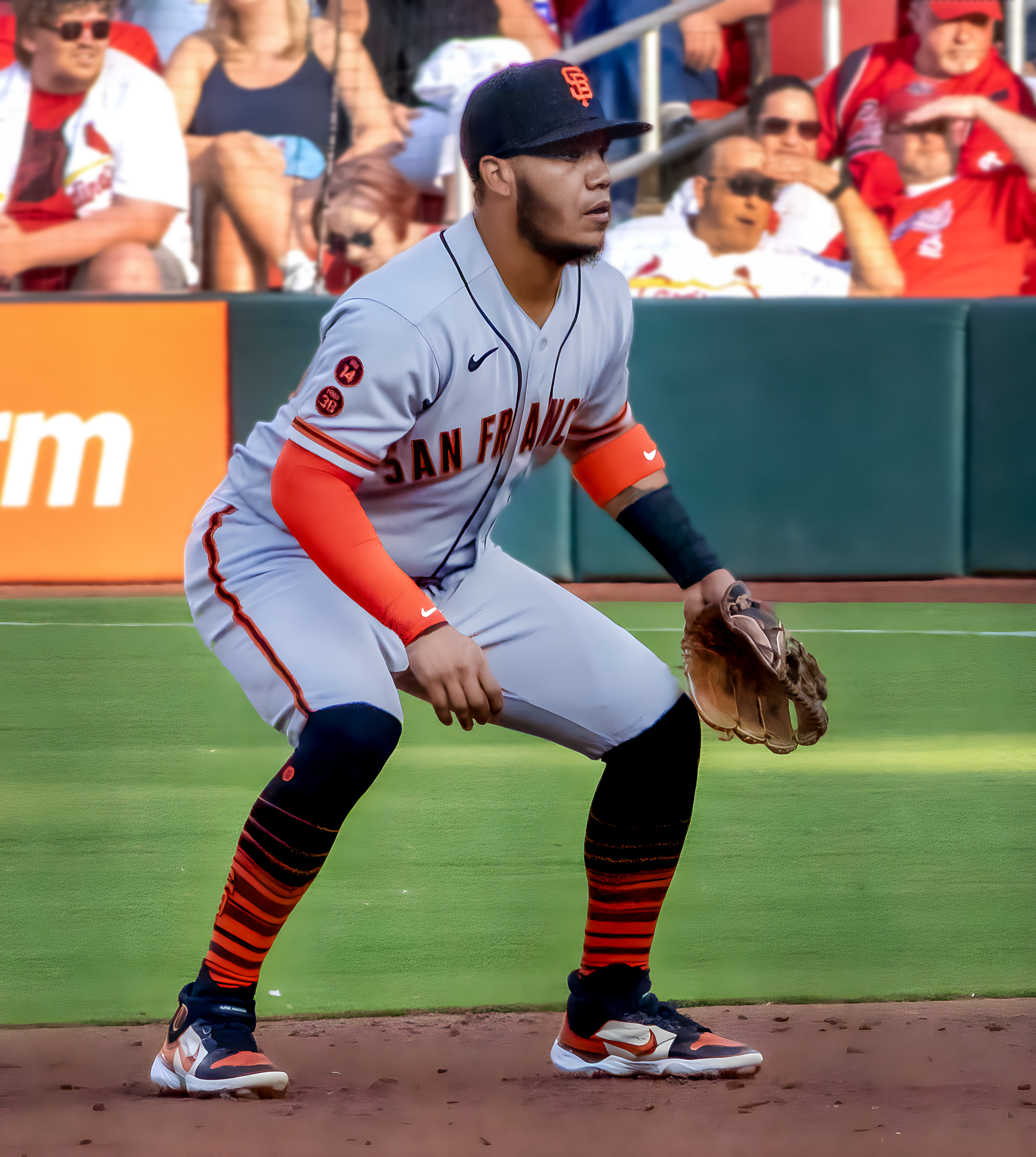
Estrada playing second base in 2023

In 2021 with the Giants, Estrada batted .273/.333/.479 with seven home runs and 22 RBIs in 121 at bats. He played 19 games at shortstop, 16 games at second base, four games at third base, four games in left field, and one game in right field. At TlSacramento, he batted .333/.399/.538 with nine home runs and 40 RBI in 210 at-bats.

In 2022, Estrada batted .260/.322/.402 with 71 runs, 14 home runs, 62 RBI, 21 stolen bases (7th in the NL) in 27 attempts, 5.5 at bats per strikeout (8th), and 14 hit by pitch (7th), and had the fastest sprint speed of all Giants players, at 28.3 feet per second. On defense he had a range factor per 9 innings at second base of 4.22 (3rd). He was placed on the seven-day concussion injured list after being hit in the head by a Mark Leiter Jr. changeup.

On January 13, 2023, Estrada agreed to a one-year, $2.25 million contract with the Giants for the 2023 season, avoiding salary arbitration. In 120 games for the Giants, he slashed .271/.315/.416 with 14 home runs, 49 RBI, and 23 stolen bases.

Estrada played in 96 games for San Francisco in 2024, slashing .217/.247/.343 with nine home runs and 47 RBI. On August 30, he was removed from the 40-man roster and sent outright to Triple-A Sacramento. He elected free agency on October 1.

=== Colorado Rockies (2025) ===
On January 9, 2025, Estrada signed a one-year, $3.25 million contract with the Colorado Rockies that included a 2026 mutual option. Estrada was slated to start the year as Colorado's starting second baseman but suffered a broken right wrist following a hit by pitch, which ruled him out for four-to-eight weeks. He was transferred to the 60-day injured list on April 25. Estrada was activated on May 30. He returned to the injured list on July 11 due to a sprained left thumb, and was reactivated on July 25. In 39 games for the Rockies, Estrada batted .253/.285/.370 with three home runs, 21 RBI, and one stolen base. On August 6, Estrada was placed on the injured list for the third time after suffering a right hamstring strain during a game against the Toronto Blue Jays. He was transferred to the 60-day injured list two days later, ending his season. The Rockies turned down his mutual option on November 3. After being removed from the 40-man roster and sent outright to the Triple-A Albuquerque Isotopes on November 6, Estrada elected free agency.

=== Saraperos de Saltillo ===
On February 23, 2026, Estrada signed a minor league contract with the Baltimore Orioles. The Orioles granted Estrada his release on March 23, after he failed to make the team's Opening Day roster.

On April 25, 2026, Estrada signed with the Saraperos de Saltillo of the Mexican League.

== Personal life ==
In January 2018, Estrada was shot in his right hip/thigh by a pair of teenagers in a robbery attempt in his hometown of Bejuma in Venezuela, while he and his wife were in a cafe and he was at the counter. The bullet was not removed until six months later, in July 2018 in a hospital in Tampa, Florida. He said, "The situation [in Venezuela] is not very good, not very safe... it makes you think about [not] even going back anymore."

Estrada married his wife on September 19, 2017. Their daughter was born on January 5, 2019. He also had a son from a previous relationship.

Estrada's first name is based on Jairo, his father's and uncle's first name. It begins with a "T" to sound different and "more American."
