= 1985 Cubana de Aviación Ilyushin Il-18 crash =

1985 aviation accident in Cuba

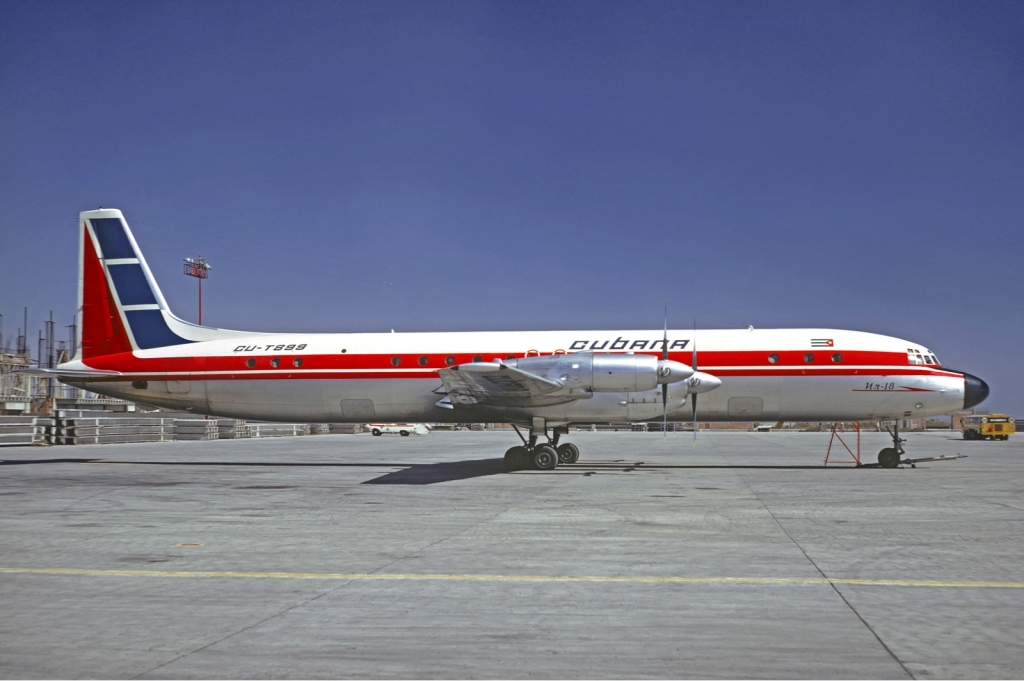
- CU-T899, the aircraft involved in the accident, photographed in 1971

Accident
- Date: 19 January 1985
- Site: San José de las Lajas, Cuba; 22°58′10″N 82°11′36″W

Aircraft
- Aircraft type: Ilyushin Il-18D
- Operator: Cubana de Aviación
- Registration: CU-T899
- Flight origin: José Martí International Airport, Havana, Cuba
- Destination: Augusto C. Sandino International Airport, Managua, Nicaragua
- Occupants: 38
- Passengers: 33
- Crew: 5
- Fatalities: 38
- Survivors: 0

On 19 January 1985, a Cubana de Aviación Ilyushin Il-18D, operating a scheduled international flight from José Martí International Airport, Cuba, to Augusto C. Sandino International Airport, Nicaragua. It crashed near San José de las Lajas, Cuba, killing all 38 people on board. The crash was attributed to a malfunctioning artificial horizon or shifting of the aircraft's cargo.

There were a large number of Nicaraguan government officials killed in the crash, including the vice president of the Central Bank of Nicaragua, the secretary of international relations of the Sandinista Workers' Centre and the American secretary of the Committee for Peace.

The crash was one of the worst aviation accidents in Cuba.

== Accident ==
The flight was operated by Cubana de Aviación with a 1968 Soviet-build Ilyushin Il-18D registered as CU-T899 (MSN: 188011102). The aircraft took off from José Martí International Airport in Havana, heading to Managua, Nicaragua, at around 8 am local time. Shortly after takeoff the aircraft banked 30 degrees right two times, then baked left with a sharper angle and eventually crashed into a highway near San José de las Lajas, southwest of Havana. According to witnessess the aircraft was in trouble directly after take-off. All 38 people on board were killed.

== Victims ==
On board there were 38 people, five crew members and 33 passengers. Initial reports stated a total of 40 people (32 passengers and 8 crew members). In total, victims included 10 people from Nicaragua, one from United States, Argentina, Guatemala, Costa Rica and Mexico and the others, 17 passengers and all eight crew members, were from Cuba.

The ten Nicaraguan people onboard included multiple government officials. One of them was Noel Gonzalez, the vice president of the Central Bank of Nicaragua, Francisco Gonzalez, the secretary of international relations of the Sandinista Workers' Centre and Hanz Gutierrez, an official in a Nicaraguan government's planning and budget ministry and embassy worker Marcos Valle. Next to them the daughter and of the Nicaraguan Ambassador in Cuba and the daughter of Doris Maria Tijerino who is the deputy interior minister were killed.

The American onboard was Sandy Pollack, secretary of the 'Committee for Peace' in the United States.

== Investigation ==
Initial reports stated a technical malfunction of the aircraft caused the crash. It was also stated the aircraft couldn't make contact with a control tower on the Isle of Youth, south of the western coast of Cuba.

Cuba investigated the crash. The final investigation couldn't determine the exact cause of the crash. Two possible reaseons were indicated. At first failure of the artificial horizon; the flight instrument that indicates the orientation; could have cause the crash. It is also possible that the cargo shifted during the turn to the right, modifying the Center of Gravity and resulting in the loss of control of the aircraft. The main finding of the investigation indicated that a fire broke out in one of the engines.

=== Postponing events ===
The ceremony of the awarding of the "Augusto Cesar Sandino medal" to the chatolic priest Ernesto Cardenal, which was scheduled to take place in Nicaragua, was postponed due to the crash.

=== Nicaraguan bodies return ===
On 21 January, the ten Nicaraguans who were killed in the crash, where transported with a special flight to Managua. The return ceremony of this return was attended by among others Cuban President Fidel Castro.
