= Eyzaguirre =

Eyzaguirre is a surname of Basque origin. Spelling variants include Eizaguirre, attested specially in Spain, or Eizagirre, modern Basque spelling. Other historically attested forms are "Aizaguirre" (Gipuzkoa, 1782), "Aiçaguer", "Aizagerri" (placename in Pamplona, 1574).

Many Eizag(u)irre surnames come from the coastal area of Getaria and Zarautz, in the province of Gipuzkoa (Spain), where it is popular nowadays. It probably means 'place exposed to wind': (h)aize ('wind') + agirre ('exposed place, hill').

It may refer to:

== Notable People ==
- Agustín Eyzaguirre, Provisional President of Chile (1826–1827)
- Domingo Eyzaguirre, Chilean politician and philanthropist
- Francisca Eyzaguirre, Chilean actress
- Ignacio Eizaguirre, Basque footballer
- Jaime Eyzaguirre, Chilean historian
- Luis Eyzaguirre, Chilean soccer player
- Nicolás Eyzaguirre, Chilean Minister of Finance (2000–2006)
- Sebastián Eyzaguirre, Chilean journalist
- Xabier Eizagirre, Basque footballer
- Delfín Eyzaguirre Sanjinés, Renown Bolivian Lawyer (1889–1963)
- Fermín Eyzaguirre, Bolivian Signee of the Declaration of Independence of Bolivia

== See also ==
- Izaguirre
- Izagirre
