= Cubana de Aviación Flight 493 =

1951 mid-air collision

Coordinates: 24.5352°N 81.7943°W

Cubana de Aviación Flight 493 US Navy SNB-1 Kansan
Accident
- Date: April 25, 1951
- Summary: Mid-air collision
- Site: Key West, Florida
- Total fatalities: 43
- Total survivors: 0

First aircraft
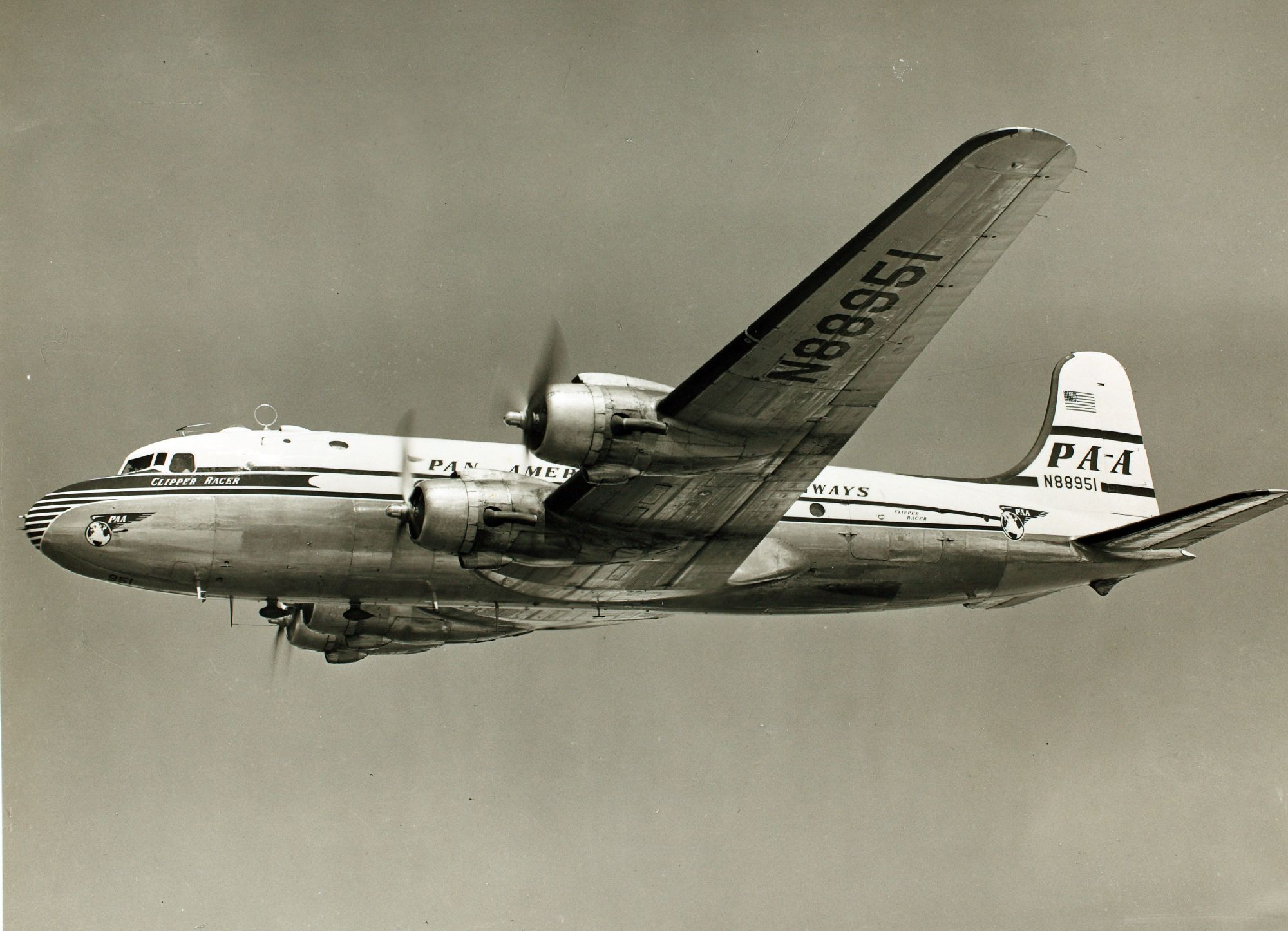
- A DC-4 similar to the accident aircraft
- Type: Douglas DC-4
- Operator: Cubana de Aviación
- Registration: CU-T188
- Passengers: 34
- Crew: 5
- Fatalities: 39
- Survivors: 0

Second aircraft
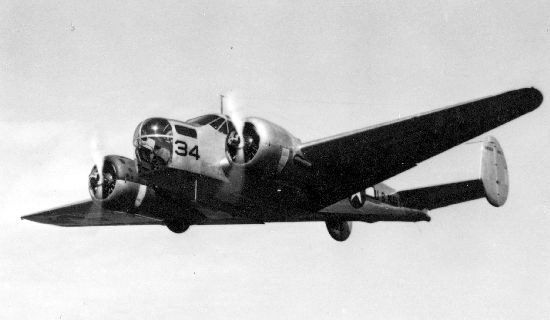
- A Beechcraft SNB-1 Kansan similar to the accident aircraft
- Type: Beechcraft SNB-1 Kansan
- Operator: United States Navy
- Registration: 39939
- Passengers: 0
- Crew: 4
- Survivors: 0

Cubana de Aviación Flight 493, registration CU-T188, was a Douglas DC-4 en route from Miami, Florida, to Havana, Cuba, on April 25, 1951. A US Navy Beechcraft SNB-1 Kansan, BuNo 39939, was on an instrument training flight in the vicinity of Naval Air Station Key West, Florida, at the same time. The two aircraft collided in mid-air over Key West, killing all 43 aboard both aircraft.

== Flight history ==
Flight 493 departed Miami at 11:09 a.m. that day and was cleared to climb to 4,000 feet on a direct heading to Key West. Approximately ten minutes later, the SNB-1 took off from Key West NAS for simulated instrument training. Although the flight was not cleared to a specific altitude or heading, standard instrument training procedures were in place. At 11:49 a.m. Flight 493, heading south, and the SNB-1, heading west, collided over the Key West NAS at an estimated altitude of 4,000 feet.

The four-motored transport, with 34 passengers and five crewmen, power-dived into the ocean a half-mile offshore at a speed estimated by onlookers at 600 miles an hour and sank in water 20 feet deep. The Navy plane, a twin-engined Beechcraft with a crew of four on a routine instrument-training flight, went to pieces as it fell and crashed two miles west of the transport.

Witnesses' accounts of the collision varied. Mrs. Lucille Cleary, wife of a Navy pilot, said she believed the tail of the transport was on fire before the planes rammed. Other spectators said they saw no fire on either plane. George and Charles Faraldo, operators of a Key West Flying Service, looked up as they heard the noise of the collision. They said the left wing of the transport had been sheared off opposite the outer engine.

The plane then went into a tight spiral, the Faraldos related, but the pilot managed to pull out with full power. Then it went into a straight nose-dive. As it crashed, water spewed so high into the air that they could see it over the treetops at the airport.

Although the Navy plane was engaged in blind flying practice, Capt. R. S. Quackenbush Jr., commanding officer of the Boca Chica Naval Air Station here, said that in such cases "one of the pilots has clear visual observation at all times." The DC-4 fell just offshore from the "Little White House" where President Truman sometimes vacations. He spent three weeks here last month.

Hundreds of sunbathers on the beaches were shocked to attention by the explosive noise of the collision and saw the planes plummet into the sea. The transport splashed columns of water fifty feet into the air. There was no hope from the beginning that anybody on either plane had survived.

Rescue boats swarmed to the scene so quickly that the first body from the Navy plane was recovered within ten minutes and the first from the airliner within 15 minutes. By 11 p.m., Navy divers had brought up 19 bodies from the submerged wreckage of the transport. Shortly before dark, diving operations were halted temporarily and efforts were started to raise the wreckage to the surface. The engines came up first. The fuselage, which rolled up like a ball on impact with the water, will not be raised until morning, but the Navy craft used searchlights to continue the hunt for more bodies through the night.

An investigation of the crash was started immediately by a naval board of inquiry headed by Captain Quackenbush. Officials also were here from the Civil Aeronautics Authority.

— The New York Times, April 26, 1951

== Investigation ==
Civil Aeronautics Authority (CAA) investigators determined that there were no mechanical problems with either aircraft. Both were operating under visual flight rules, as the weather at the time of the crash was clear and calm. The probable cause of the accident was given by the CAA as a failure on the parts of both air crews to exercise due vigilance in looking for and avoiding conflicting traffic. The CAA also called for a review of air traffic control procedures.

== See also ==
- Aviation safety
- Cubana de Aviación accidents and incidents
- List of accidents and incidents involving commercial aircraft

== External links and references ==
- Civil Aeronautics Board Aircraft Accident Report on the collision (Archive)
- Accident description at the Aviation Safety Network
- "Airliner and Navy Plane Collide; 43 Persons Die". St. Petersburg Times. St. Petersburg, FL. UP. April 26, 1951. p. 1. Archived from the original (PDF) on January 24, 2013. (plaintext)
- "Airliner in Collision" (PDF). The Sydney Morning Herald. Sydney, Australia. AP. April 27, 1951. p. 3. (plaintext)
- "Raising Shattered Plane Which Claimed 39 in Atlantic Collision" (PDF). Rome News-Tribune. Rome, GA. INS. April 26, 1951. p. 1. (plaintext)
