= Aguirre, Venezuela =

Aguirre
- Village
- Location within Venezuela
- Coordinates: maps 10.229535°N 68.273131°W
- Country: Venezuela
- State: Carabobo
- Municipality: Bejuma
- Time zone: UTC−4 (VET)

Aguirre is a little village in the municipality of Bejuma in Carabobo state, Venezuela. This village is very religious, handcrafts, agriculture, poultry and removal of lime.
