= Fragmentation of memory =

Psychological disorder

Fragmentation of types and aspects of memory can be understood as a memory disorder that includes subjective and phenomenonological facets directly impacting the ability of an individual to recall memories in an integrated and holistic way. A person has difficulty in associating the context of the memories to their autobiographical (episodic) memory. While the explicit facts and details of the events may be known to the person (semantic memory), the facts of the events retrieve none of the affective and somatic elements of the experience. Therefore, the emotional and personal content of the memories can't be associated with the rest of the memory. Fragmentation of memory can occur for relatively recent events as well.

The impaired person usually has physical damage to or underdevelopment of the hippocampus. This may be due to a genetic disorder or be the result of trauma, such as post-traumatic stress disorder. Brain dysfunction often has other related consequences, such as oversensitivity to some stimuli, impulsiveness, lack of direction in life, occasional aggressiveness, a distorted perception of oneself, and impaired ability to empathize with others, which is usually masked.

== Definition ==
Fragmentation of memory is a type of memory disruption pertaining to the flaws or irregularities in sequences of memories, "coherence, and content" in the narrative or story of the event. During a traumatic experience, memories can be encoded irregularly which creates imperfections in the memory. It is also described as a memory that has been jumbled, confused, or repeated unnecessarily.

== Causes ==
Memories of trauma are often fragmented because these memories aren't usually put together properly. Instead, they include intense emotions, sensations, and perceptions. Memories of traumatic events can eventually be constructed into a narrative but usually remain fragmented. In peri-traumatic dissociation, where individuals separate memories from their emotional experiences, there is a "data-driven" processing style and "conceptually driven" processing occurs less. This leads to fragmentation of memory relating to the events of the trauma, meaning that the individual encoded the trauma based on facts of what they saw but they are missing the structure that pieces this together into one synthesized memory. Fragmentation of memory is claimed to happen in posttraumatic stress disorder victims often. During the traumatic event, dissociation occurs and this leads to irregularities in the encoding process. This then leads to lapses in the memory and therefore fragmentation of memory. Therefore, it is important to understand fragmentation of memory in order to treat posttraumatic stress disorder.

== Experimentation ==
Most experiments involving memory fragmentation have been based on empirical studies where individuals were asked to recall memories. These individuals were asked to recall a traumatic event and explain their memories of the event. Their responses were then analysed for "cohesiveness and semantic structure". While experimentation has found results relating to fragmentation of memory, these findings aren't always very clear or conclusive because there are limitations regarding the methods used in experiments. These can be attributed to examples such as the fact that there isn't a definite way to test for posttraumatic stress disorder.

== Dissociation and Fragmentation of Memory ==
Dissociation has been linked to fragmentation of memory. Dissociation of traumatic events is often associated with fragmentation of memory. After a traumatic event, people often dissociate from the experience by separating memories from the emotions involved. In peri-traumatic dissociation, the memory of the trauma is fragmented because of how the information is encoded. It is encoded with mostly a "data-driven" processing style and less of a "conceptually driven" processing style. This means that the data of the surroundings are encoded, such as the details of the individual's surroundings but many of the more complex and conceptual information isn't properly encoded in the memory.

These two terms are commonly used together but it is also stated that a solid review of the findings for this link has not yet been completed.

Fragmentation of memory is common in two dissociative disorders.

- Dissociative or Psychogenic Amnesia is not to be confused with general amnesia, in which the sufferer is unable to recall whole periods of time, perhaps of several years' duration. In the dissociative version, there a disruption in recalling specific events, usually involving memories pertaining to the trauma itself. The disorder also relates to the person's emotional state while experiencing the trauma. While the person may be able to remember the verbal details of the events, the emotional and somatosensory sensations tied to the experience break down during the processing of the memory.
- Dissociative Fugue normally revolves around a specific journey taken by the person suffering from the disorder. They can travel great distances and have no recollection of having done so. These unremembered trips are usually the result of the individual trying to escape an unbearable situation, and many times while traveling, the person unknowingly suffers some degree of identity distortion or even assumes a completely new identity. One of the unique characteristics of this disorder is that upon completing the trip, the sufferer normally remembers it and all the details associated with it, but while the events are happening, s/he has no recollection of time passing or where s/he physically is.

== Notable cases ==
- Maylen Díaz Almaguer- sole survivor of the Cubana de Aviación Flight 972 crash. She suffered from fragmentation of memory in which she stated that she had suffered an automobile accident and denied having been involved in an airplane crash.

== See also ==
- Short-term memory
- Long-term memory
