= Sandinista Workers' Centre =

CST
- Sandinista Workers' Centre
- Central Sandinista de Trabajadores
- Headquarters: Managua, Nicaragua
- Location: Nicaragua
- Affiliations: ITUC

1980 CST May Day poster

The Sandinista Workers' Centre (Spanish: Central Sandinista de Trabajadores, CST) is the dominant national trade union center in Nicaragua. It was formed following the Sandinista National Liberation Front (FSLN) revolution of 1979. The CST is closely linked with the FSLN, and was previously affiliated with the World Federation of Trade Unions.

The CST later affiliated with the International Confederation of Free Trade Unions, which went on to form the International Trade Union Confederation
