= 11th FAI World Rally Flying Championship =

11th FAI World Rally Flying Championship took place between September 4–12, 1999 in Ravenna in Italy.

There were 48 crews from 16 countries: Poland (5), South Africa (5), Italy (5), France (4), Czech Republic (4), Slovakia (4), Austria (4), Germany (4), United Kingdom (2), Greece (2), Russia (2), Spain (2), Chile (2), Republic of Macedonia (2), Slovenia (1), Cyprus (1).

== Contest ==
First navigation competition:

1. Nigel Hopkins / Dale de Klerk ZAF - 96 penal points
2. Janusz Darocha / Zbigniew Chrząszcz POL - 102 pts
3. Krzysztof Wieczorek / Wacław Wieczorek POL - 124 pts

Second navigation competition:

1. Włodzimierz Skalik / Ryszard Michalski POL - 166 pts
2. Jiři Jakes / Lubomir Šťovíček CZE - 106 pts
3. Janusz Darocha / Zbigniew Chrząszcz POL - 120 pts

Third navigation competition:

1. Krzysztof Wieczorek / Wacław Wieczorek POL - 4 pts
2. Jerzy Markiewicz / Dariusz Zawłocki POL - 65 pts
3. Joël Tremblet / Jose Bertanier FRA - 71 pts

== Results ==
=== Individual (10 best) ===
#	Pilot / navigator	Country	Aircraft	Penal points for 1st / 2nd / 3rd competition = total
1.	Krzysztof Wieczorek / Wacław Wieczorek	POL		124 + 128 + 4	256
2.	Janusz Darocha / Zbigniew Chrząszcz	POL		102 + 120 + 200	422
3.	Nigel Hopkins / Dale de Klerk	ZAF		96 + 192 + 332	620
4.	František Cihlář / Petr Toužimský	CZE		306 + 126 + 194	626
5.	Włodzimierz Skalik / Ryszard Michalski	POL		225 + 94 + 312	631
6.	Jiři Jakes / Lubomir Šťovíček	CZE		276 + 106 + 260	642
7.	Joël Tremblet / Jose Bertanier	FRA		166 + 464 + 71	701
8.	Marek Kachaniak / Sławomir Własiuk	POL		267 + 236 + 310	813
9.	Philippe Odeon / Jean-Pierre Delmas	FRA		244 + 276 + 320	840
10.	Jerzy Markiewicz / Dariusz Zawłocki	POL		320 + 476 + 65	861

=== Team ===
Two best crews were counted (number of penal points):

1. POL - 678
2. CZE - 1268
3. FRA - 1541
4. ZAF - 2178
5. AUT - 2554
6. DEU - 2570
7. GBR - 3459
8. ITA - 3972
9. SVK - 4752
10. ESP - 6629
11. MKD - 9198
12. RUS - 9295
13. GRC - 9876
14. CHL - 11952
15. CYP - 12740

== Trivia ==
All five Polish crews took places in the best ten.
