= Cubana de Aviación Flight 9046 =

1989 aviation accident

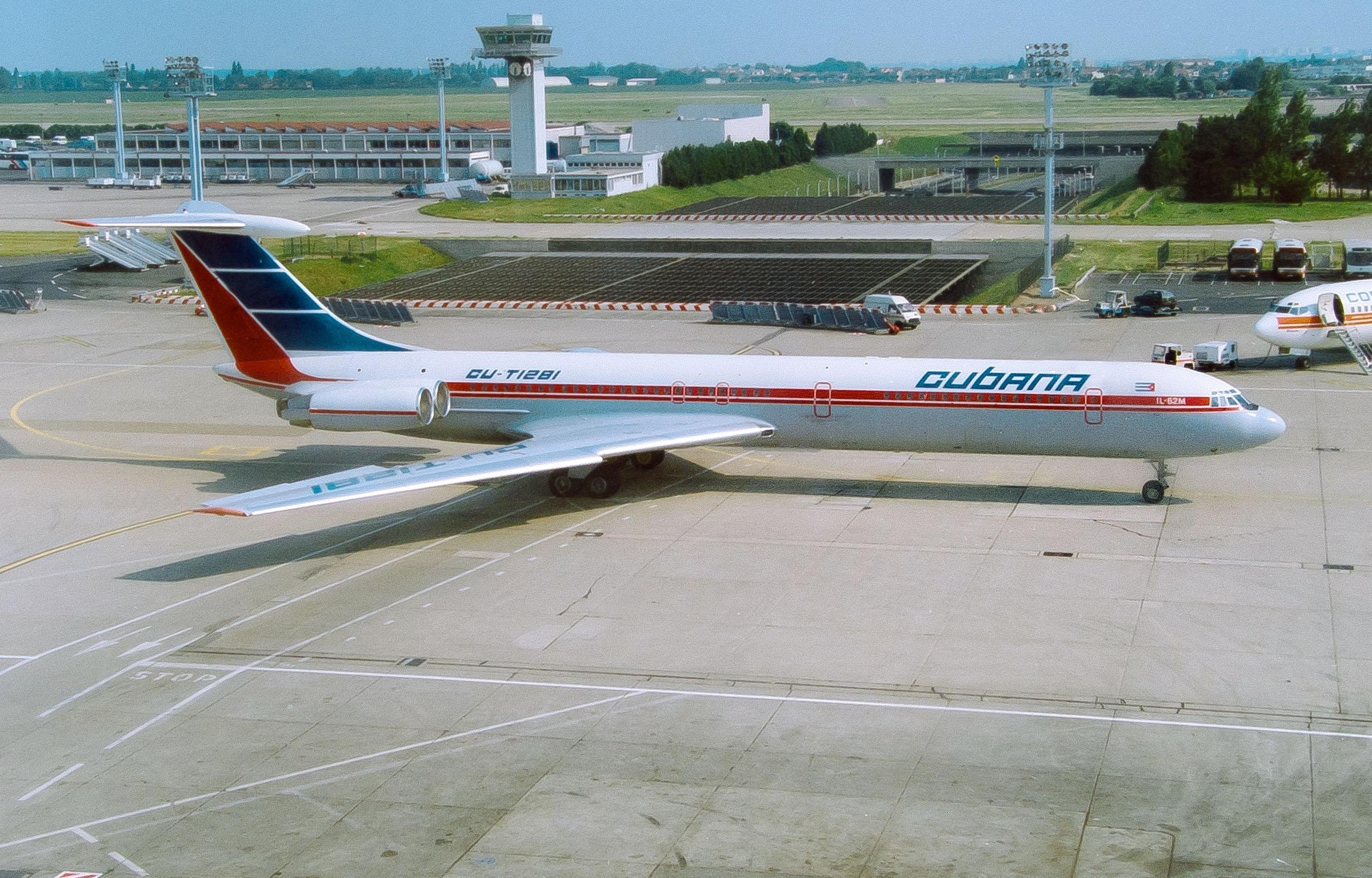
- CU-T1281, the aircraft involved in the accident, seen in June 1989

Accident
- Date: 3 September 1989
- Summary: Crashed on takeoff, due to low altitude windshear and pilot error
- Site: Near José Martí International Airport, Havana, Cuba; 23.012°N 82.380°W
- Total fatalities: 150

Aircraft
- Aircraft type: Ilyushin Il-62M
- Operator: Cubana
- IATA flight No.: CU9046
- ICAO flight No.: CUB9046
- Call sign: CUBANA 9046
- Registration: CU-T1281
- Flight origin: José Martí International Airport
- Stopover: Cologne Bonn Airport
- Destination: Malpensa Airport
- Occupants: 126
- Passengers: 115
- Crew: 11
- Fatalities: 126
- Survivors: 0

Ground casualties
- Ground fatalities: 24
- Ground injuries: 16

Cubana de Aviación Flight 9046 was a chartered Ilyushin Il-62M airliner (registered CU-T1281) operated by Cubana, which crashed on 3 September 1989, shortly after takeoff from José Martí International Airport.

Flight 9046 was due to operate a non-scheduled international Havana-Cologne-Milan passenger service. The crash resulted in the deaths of all 126 occupants of the aircraft plus 24 people on the ground. It is the worst aviation disaster to have ever occurred in Cuba.

== Crew ==
The pilot-in-command was 50-year-old Captain Armando Oliveros Arguelles, he had accumulated a total of 12,790 hours of flight time, including 6,487 hours on the Il-62M. The co-pilot was 40-year-old First Officer Miguel Ruiz Ravelo, with 7,559 hours of flight time, 2,872 hours were on the Il-62M. The navigator, 55-year-old Tomas Estrada Garcia, had a total of 17,675 hours of flight time, with 6,917 on the Il-62M. There were two mechanics: 45-year-old Fernando Diaz de los Arcos had a total of 11,554 flight hours, including 5,191 hours on the Il-62M; while 42-year-old Luis Herrera Altuna had a total of 1,249 flight hours.

== Accident ==
The aircraft took off in heavy rain and wind gusts of 30–50 miles per hour (48–80 km/h). The crew retracted the flaps from their initial 30° position to 15°, in an attempt to gain speed, but this action reduced the ability of the wing to provide lift. The aircraft climbed to about 53 metres (174 ft), where it was hit by a downdraft that caused the airframe to strike the end of the runway, subsequently hitting a navigational facility and a small hill before crashing into a residential area, about one minute after takeoff. All 126 people on board —115 passengers, most of them Italian holidaymakers, and a crew of 11— perished in the accident. An additional 40 people on the ground were injured, including 24 fatally, as a result of the crash.

== Cause ==
Investigators attributed the crash of Flight 9046 to the pilot's decision to fly after an abrupt deterioration in the meteorological conditions. The pilot underestimated the risks of taking off and misjudged the aircraft's performance in poor weather.

== Victims ==
- 115 passengers
- 11 crew members
- 24 on the ground

Only one of the passengers survived the crash initially. He lived for nine days but succumbed to his injuries afterwards.

== See also ==
- Cubana de Aviación accidents and incidents
