= Izaguirre =

Izaguirre is a surname of Basque origin with roots in the Basque Country, especially Gipuzkoa and Navarre (Spain). It is a variant of the surname Eyzaguirre.

The name may refer to:

== Notable people ==
- Boris Izaguirre (born 1965), Venezuelan-Spanish screenwriter, journalist, and showman
- Emilio Izaguirre (born 1986), Honduran professional footballer
- Júnior Izaguirre (born 1979), Honduran professional footballer
- Leandro Izaguirre (1867–1941), Mexican painter, illustrator, and teacher
- María Izaguirre (1891–1979), First lady of Mexico while husband Adolfo Ruiz Cortines was President
- Pablo Alejandro Izaguirre (born 1970), Argentine professional footballer and coach
- Silverio Izaguirre (1898–1935), Spanish Olympic footballer
- Mary K. Izaguirre, US Army lieutenant general

== See also ==
- Gorka Izagirre
- Jon Izagirre
- Raul Yzaguirre, whose name is sometimes spelled Izaguirre
