= Air Afrique Flight 056 =

1987 airplane hijacking

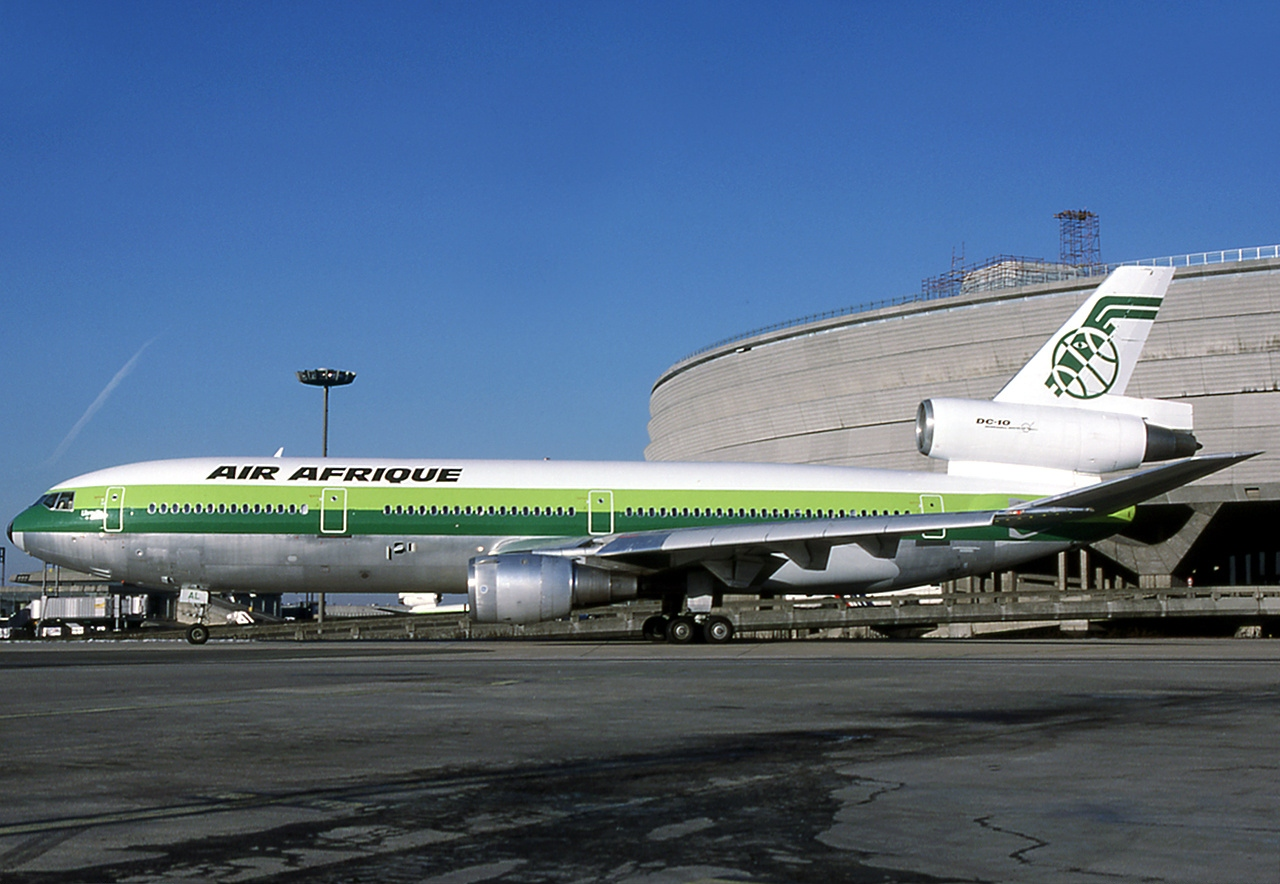
- TU-TAL, the aircraft involved in the hijacking

Hijacking
- Date: 24 July 1987
- Summary: Aircraft hijacking
- Site: Geneva Airport, Geneva, Switzerland; 46°14′11″N 6°06′26″E

Aircraft
- Aircraft type: McDonnell Douglas DC-10-30
- Aircraft name: Libreville
- Operator: Air Afrique
- Registration: TU-TAL
- Flight origin: Maya-Maya Airport, Brazzaville, Republic of the Congo
- 1st stopover: Bangui M'Poko International Airport, Bangui, Central African Republic
- Last stopover: Rome Fiumicino Airport, Rome, Italy
- Destination: Charles de Gaulle Airport, Paris, France
- Occupants: 158
- Passengers: 143
- Crew: 15
- Fatalities: 1
- Injuries: 30
- Survivors: 157

On 24 July 1987, Air Afrique Flight 056, a McDonnell Douglas DC-10-30 operating the Brazzaville–Bangui–Rome–Paris service was hijacked and diverted to Geneva Airport. One passenger was killed and 30 people were injured.

== Aircraft ==
The aircraft involved was a McDonnell Douglas DC-10-30, aircraft registration TU-TAL, that was manufactured in 1972. It would later be destroyed as Cubana de Aviación Flight 1216 on 21 December 1999 as F-GTDI due to a runway overrun.

== Background ==
The hijacker was 21-year-old Hussein Ali Mohammed Hariri, a Lebanese Shiite who had ties to Hezbollah and the Popular Front for the Liberation of Palestine (PFLP). He had been imprisoned in Israel in 1984 on terrorism charges, but was released in 1985 as part of an International Red Cross exchange for captured Israeli soldiers.

== Hijacking ==
Hariri boarded the flight carrying a pistol and an explosives belt with 500 grams of TNT. Hariri hijacked the flight after it departed Rome Fiumicino Airport and demanded the aircraft to be flown to Beirut. The captain, Eduard Artisu, responded that there was insufficient fuel for the aircraft to reach Beirut without a refueling stop and offered to make a refueling stop in Geneva,Switzerland, which Hariri accepted.

=== Raid ===
Flight 56 landed in Geneva at 8:08 AM. Hariri demanded the release of terrorists Mohammed Ali Hammadi, the lead hijacker of TWA Flight 847, and his brother Abbas Ali Hamadei, aged 22 and 26 respectively. Both were imprisoned in West Germany. Hariri also threatened to kill passengers if his demands were not met. Two hours later, Hariri shot and killed 28-year-old French passenger Xavier Beaulieu. Four hours after landing, passengers opened the emergency exits and began to evacuate the aircraft via the evacuation slides. One flight attendant attempted to overpower Hariri but was shot and injured. 29 people received injuries during the evacuation. The Swiss police then raided the aircraft and overpowered Hariri. The operation lasted eight minutes, while the entire hijacking had lasted for nearly four hours.

== Aftermath ==
Two years after the hijacking, Hussein Hariri was tried at the Federal Supreme Court of Switzerland Lausanne for hijacking, murder, and attempted murder. He was convicted and sentenced to life imprisonment.

In 2002, he escaped from prison and spent three months on the run. At the time, he had been allowed weekend furloughs from prison, in preparation for his release on parole in 2004.

Hariri was released in 2004 and deported to Lebanon.
