= Agirre =

Agirre is a Basque surname. Notable people with the surname include:

- Naroa Agirre (born 1979), Spanish pole vaulter
- Josu Agirre (born 1981), Spanish cyclist
- Jon Agirre (born 1997), Spanish cyclist

== See also ==
- Aguirre (surname)
