= BAP Aguirre =

Three ships of the Peruvian Navy have been named BAP Aguirre after Peruvian Commander Elías Aguirre:

- BAP Aguirre (DE-1), commissioned in 1951, was a Cannon-class destroyer escort
- BAP Aguirre (CH-84), commissioned in 1978, was a De Zeven Provinciën-class cruiser
- BAP Aguirre (FM-55), commissioned in 2005, is a Lupo-class frigate
