= Canoabo =

Parish in Carabobo, Venezuela

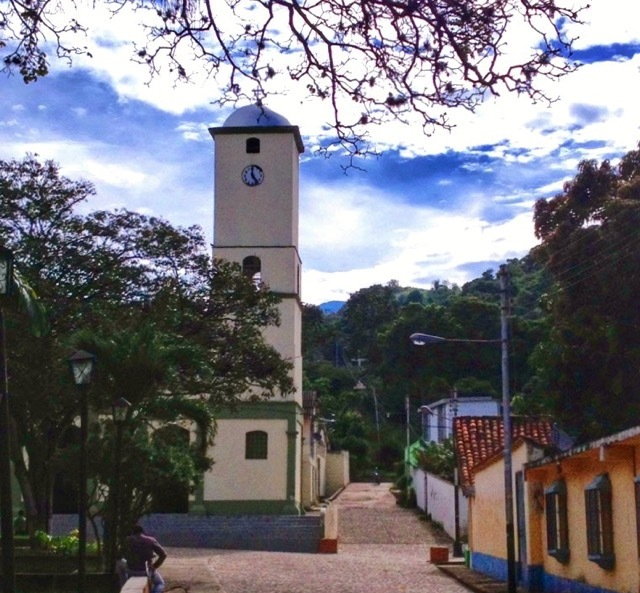
Church of San José in Canoabo

Canoabo is a parish in Bejuma Municipality, Carabobo, Venezuela. It was established on March 19, 1711, the year that the Church of San José was built. This church was destroyed in the Venezuela earthquake of 1812. The present Church of San José was built in the 19th century.
