= Bejuma Municipality =

Bejuma Municipality Municipio Bejuma
- Municipality
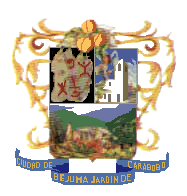
- Flag Coat of arms

- Location in Carabobo

- Location in Venezuela
- Coordinates: 10°14′48″N 68°12′04″W
- Country: Venezuela
- State: Carabobo
- Municipal seat: Bejuma

Government
  - Mayor: Lorenzo Remedios (PSUV)

Area
  - Total: 536.1 km^{2} (207.0 sq mi)

Population (2011)
  - Total: 48,538
  - Density: 90.54/km^{2} (234.5/sq mi)
- Time zone: UTC−4 (VET)
- Area code(s): 0249

The Bejuma Municipality is one of the 14 municipalities (municipios) that makes up the Venezuelan state of Carabobo and, according to the 2011 census by the National Institute of Statistics of Venezuela, the municipality has a population of 48,538. The town of Bejuma is the shire town of the Bejuma Municipality.

== Demographics ==
The Bejuma Municipality, according to a 2007 population estimate by the National Institute of Statistics of Venezuela, has a population of 45,306 (up from 39,945 in 2000). This amounts to 2% of the state's population. The municipality's population density is 96.6 inhabitants per square kilometre (250/sq mi).

== Government ==
The mayor of the Bejuma Municipality is Lorenzo Remedios, re-elected on November 23, 2008, with 46% of the vote. The municipality is divided into three parishes; Bejuma, Canoabo, and Simón Bolívar.

== Vegetation and natural resources ==
The municipality of Bejuma lies in the Cordillera La Costa Montane Forests ecoregion, and the major habitat type is tropical and subtropical moist broadleaf forests.

== See also ==
- Bejuma
- Carabobo
- Municipalities of Venezuela
