= Cubana de Aviación Flight 1216 =

1999 aviation accident

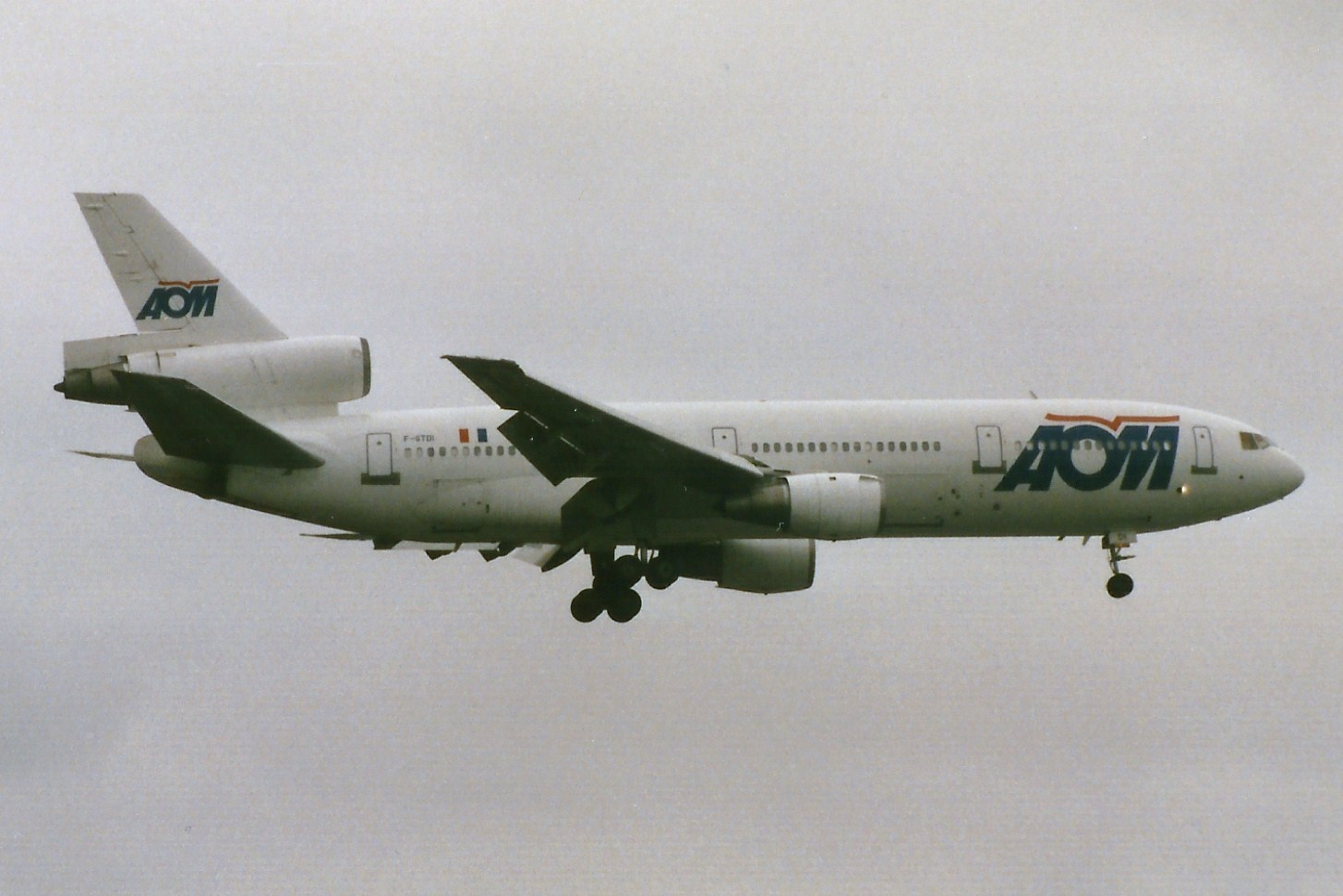
- F-GTDI, the aircraft involved in the accident, pictured in 1998

Accident
- Date: 21 December 1999
- Summary: Runway overrun
- Site: La Aurora International Airport, Guatemala City, Guatemala; 14°34.121′N 90°31.933′W
- Total fatalities: 18 (2 on ground)
- Total injuries: 57 (20 on ground)

Aircraft
- Aircraft type: McDonnell Douglas DC-10-30
- Operator: Cubana de Aviación leased from AOM French Airlines
- IATA flight No.: CU1216
- ICAO flight No.: CUB1216
- Call sign: CUBANA 1216
- Registration: F-GTDI
- Flight origin: José Martí International Airport, Havana, Cuba
- Destination: La Aurora International Airport, Guatemala City, Guatemala
- Occupants: 314
- Passengers: 296
- Crew: 18
- Fatalities: 16
- Injuries: 37
- Survivors: 298

Ground casualties
- Ground fatalities: 2
- Ground injuries: 20

Cubana de Aviación Flight 1216 was a McDonnell Douglas DC-10 that overran the runway at La Aurora International Airport, Guatemala City, on 21 December 1999. 8 passengers and 8 crew members on board were killed as well as 2 people on the ground.

== Aircraft and crew ==
The aircraft involved was a McDonell Douglas DC-10-30, registration F-GTDI, leased by Cubana de Aviación from AOM French Airlines. It was just over 27 years old and had flown 85,760 hours at the time of the accident. It had been previously owned by Air Afrique with registration TU-TAL and was involved in the hijacking of Air Afrique Flight 056.

The captain was 54-year-old Jorge Toledo, who had been a DC-10 captain since 1993 and was flying for Cubana de Aviación since 1972. He had 16,117 flight hours, including 4,872 hours on the DC-10. The first officer was 41-year-old Cecelio Hernandez, who had been a DC-10 first officer since 1993 and was flying for Cubana de Aviación since 1978. He had previously been a captain of the Yakovlev Yak-42 aircraft. Hernandez had 8,115 flight hours, with 4,156 of them on the DC-10. The 59-year-old flight engineer, Moises Borges, was the most experienced member of the crew. He had been a DC-10 flight engineer since 1992 and was flying for Cubana de Aviación since 1966. Borges logged 22,819 flight hours, including 4,939 on the DC-10.

== Accident ==
Flight 1216 was a special charter transporting Guatemalan students home from universities in Cuba. The aircraft took off from José Martí International Airport in Cuba with 296 passengers and 18 crew on board. After a two-hour flight, the aircraft was cleared to land on Runway 19 at La Aurora International Airport. On landing, the pilots were unable to stop the aircraft and it ran off the end of the runway and down a slope, crashing into ten houses. The accident killed 18 people in all: 8 passengers and 8 crew members on board the aircraft, and 2 occupants of the houses. There were 288 passengers and 10 crew who survived; however, 37 passengers and crew and another 20 people on the ground were injured in the accident. The aircraft was damaged beyond repair and written off.

The crash occurred in the La Libertad neighborhood. All three flight crew members were among the dead. Also among the dead was stewardess Johanna Toledo, who was the captain's daughter.

== Cause ==
The accident was investigated by the Accident Investigation Section (Spanish: Sección de Investigación de Accidentes) of Guatemala's Directorate General of Civil Aeronautics (Spanish: Dirección General de Aeronáutica Civil). The investigation found that the aircraft touched down too far along the wet runway with insufficient deceleration, and that the crew had failed to initiate a go-around. The spoilers were found in the down and locked position, while the flight data recorder (FDR) showed them deployed. The handle for the spoilers in the cockpit was found in an undefined position. The reason for this discrepancy was not determined by the accident investigation.

== See also ==
- Cubana de Aviación accidents and incidents
