= Xabier Eizagirre =

Spanish footballer

Personal information
- Full name: Xabier Eizagirre Aizpúrua
- Date of birth: 25 January 1984 (age 42)
- Place of birth: Mutriku, Spain
- Height: 1.88 m (6 ft 2 in)
- Position: Midfielder

Team information
- Current team: Gernika

Youth career
- 2000–2002: Real Sociedad

Senior career*
Years	Team	Apps	(Gls)
2001–2006	Real Sociedad B	76	(10)
2005–2006	→ Real Unión (loan)	23	(4)
2006–2008	Eibar	37	(3)
2008	Barakaldo	2	(0)
2009	Mirandés		
2009–2010	Sestao	28	(0)
2010–2011	Gernika		
Total		166	(17)

International career
2002–2003	Spain U19	3	(0)
- * Club domestic league appearances and goals

Xabier Eizagirre Aizpúrua (born 25 January 1984 in Mutriku, Gipuzkoa) is a Spanish retired footballer who played as a midfielder.
