= Cubana de Aviación Flight 310 =

1999 aircraft accident in Venezuela

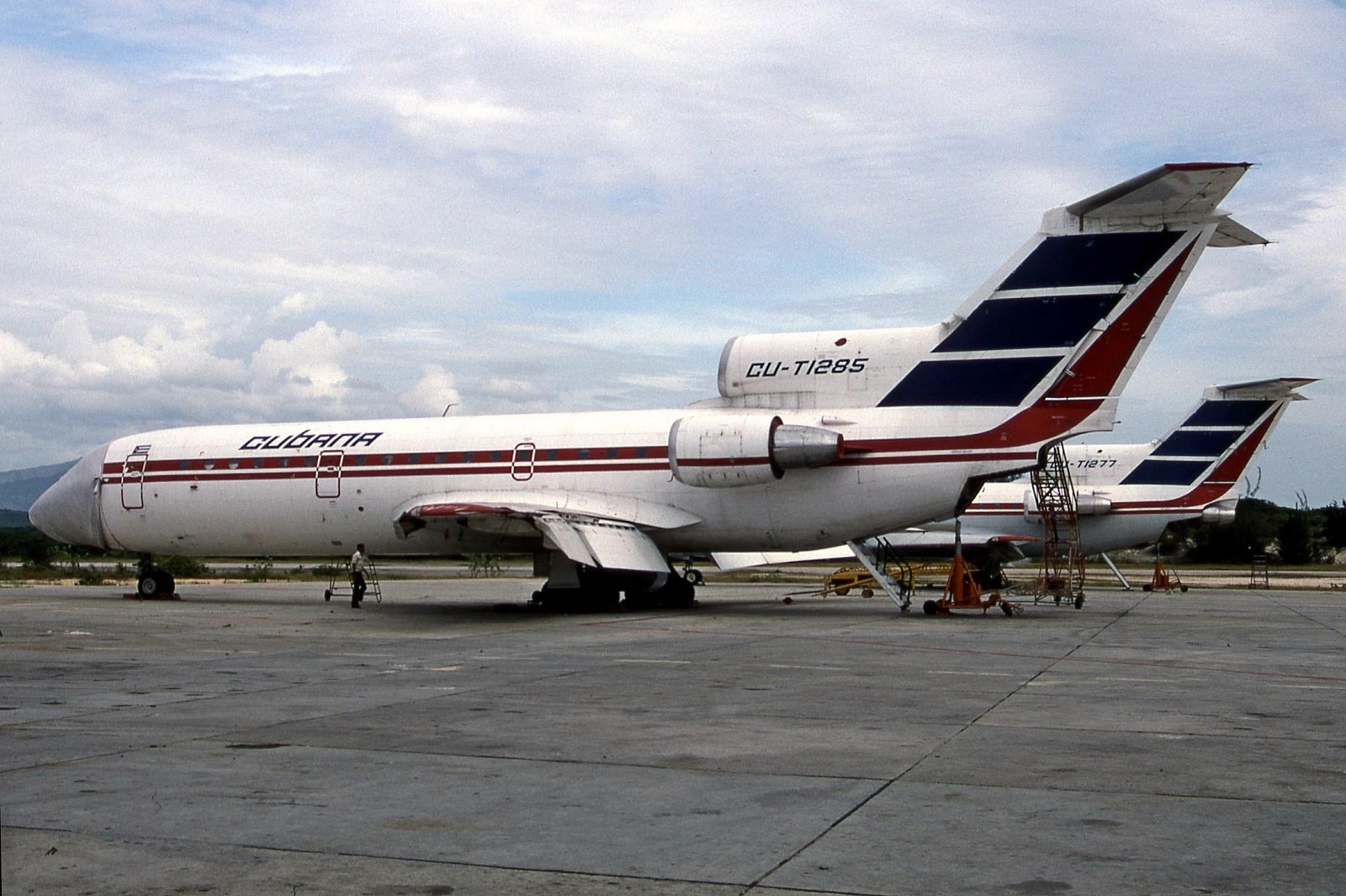
- CU-T1285, the aircraft involved in the accident, photographed in 1993 with a previous livery

Accident
- Date: 25 December 1999
- Summary: Controlled flight into terrain
- Site: Bejuma, Venezuela; 10°11.5′N 68°08.8′W

Aircraft
- Aircraft type: Yakovlev Yak-42
- Operator: Cubana de Aviación
- IATA flight No.: CU310
- ICAO flight No.: CUB310
- Call sign: CUBANA 310
- Registration: CU-T1285
- Flight origin: José Martí International Airport, Havana, Cuba
- Destination: Simón Bolívar International Airport, Caracas, Venezuela
- Occupants: 22
- Passengers: 10
- Crew: 12
- Fatalities: 22
- Survivors: 0

Cubana de Aviación Flight 310 was a scheduled international flight from José Martí International Airport, Havana, Cuba, to Arturo Michelena International Airport, Valencia, Venezuela, which crashed near Bejuma, Venezuela, on 25 December (Christmas Day) 1999. All 10 passengers and 12 crew on board were killed.

== Aircraft ==
The aircraft involved was a Yakovlev Yak-42D, registration CU-T1285. The aircraft was manufactured in 1991 as msn 4520424914068.

== Accident ==
The flight had departed José Martí International Airport, Havana, Cuba, bound for Simón Bolívar International Airport in Caracas, Venezuela. Due to mudslides and flooding, the flight was diverted to Arturo Michelena International Airport in Valencia. The aircraft was held for 40 minutes.

The pilots called Air Traffic Control at Valencia Airport to say that they were descending from 8,000 feet (2,400 m) to 4,000 feet (1,200 m) to get ready to approach. As Flight 310 started its approach to Valencia Airport, the aircraft struck the San Luis Hill. The aircraft crashed near the town of Bejuma. All 22 passengers and crew died in the crash, which happened at 20:18 local time (00:48, 26 December UTC). The location of the crash was 10°11.5′N 68°08.8′W.

== See also ==
- Cubana de Aviación accidents and incidents
