= Global Air (Mexico) =

Mexican airline

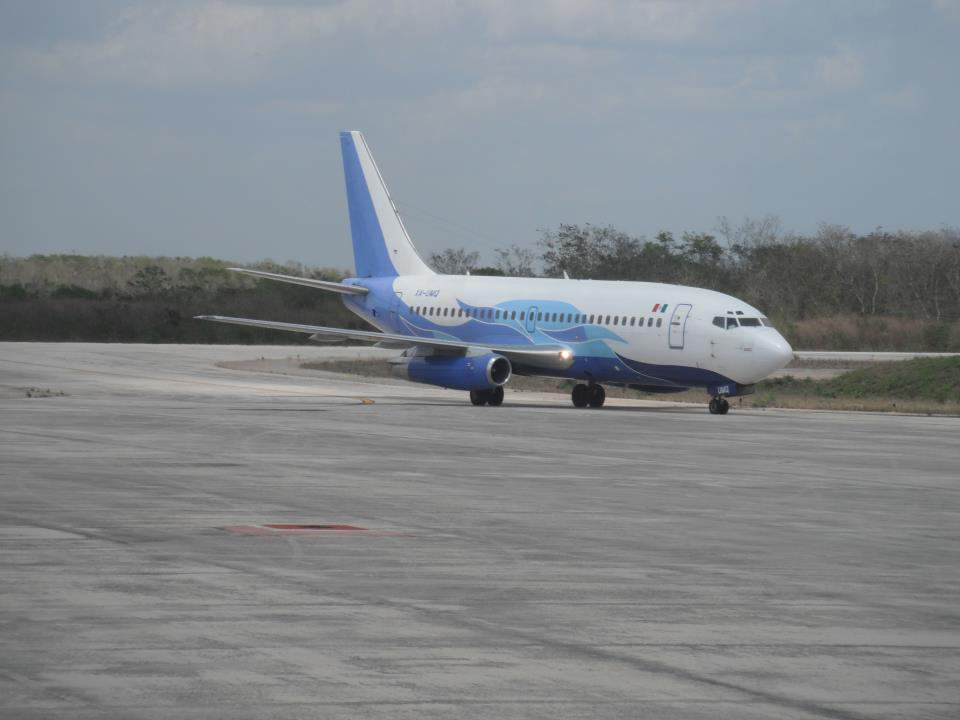
- Global Air 737-200 in 2012
IATA	ICAO	Call sign
-	DMJ	DAMOJH
- Founded: 1990; 36 years ago
- Ceased operations: 2018; 8 years ago
- Fleet size: 2
- Headquarters: Mexico City, Mexico
- Key people: Manuel Rodríguez Campo (Owner)
- Website: www.globalair.mx

Global Air (Damojh Aerolíneas, S.A. de C.V.) was a Mexican airline. Founded in Guadalajara, Jalisco, in 1990, it worked in the field of air transportation and executive business travel. It is a non-regular commercial aviation company, registered in Mexico, which provides charter services, charter and wet lease. This charter airline specialized in leasing and aircraft as well as in air rescue.

In 2018, as a result of the Cubana de Aviación Flight 972 accident, its operating certificates were rescinded and it had to declare bankruptcy.

== History ==
Global Air began operations in February 1990 under the name of Damojh Aerolíneas S.A. de C.V., based in Guadalajara. Until December 2011 it was based at the Mexico City International Airport; it subsequently built new hangars and an apron at the Capitán Rogelio Castillo National Airport located in Celaya, Guanajuato. The company slogan is Spanish: En Global Air le damos la bienvenida y lo invitamos a viajar con nosotros ya que llegará confortablemente a su destino.

On May 19, 2018, the Mexican government announced that its national civil aviation authority was to begin an operational audit of Global Air to see if the airline was in compliance with regulations, on May 21, 2018, the Mexican Directorate General of Civil Aviation temporarily revoked the company's airworthiness licence both following a fatal air accident in Cuba when one of their aircraft, a Boeing 737-200 Adv. wet-leased to Cubana de Aviación, crashed shortly after takeoff from Havana, killing 112 of the 113 people on board.

== Destinations ==
The company operated national and international charter flights within Mexico and to the Caribbean, Central and South America.

== Fleet ==
Before declaring bankruptcy, Global Air (Damojh Aerolíneas, S.A. de C.V.) operated two Boeing 737s:

- 1 Boeing 737-200, registration XA-UMQ. Stored.
- 1 Boeing 737-500, registration XA-UZK. Sold to Aeroregional, reregistered as HC-CUH

== Accidents and incidents ==
- On November 4, 2010, a Global Air Boeing 737-200, registration XA-UHY, had to make an emergency landing in the Mexican city of Puerto Vallarta due to a technical failure. That landing resulted in a suspension of activities for the airline between November and December of that year.
- Another aircraft was suspended between October 2013 and January 2014 as a result of the demand made by Marco Aurelio Hernández, captain of the company, who denounced technical irregularities in the operation of the aircraft.
- On May 18, 2018, a Global Air Boeing 737-200 Adv., registration XA-UHZ, operating on wet lease as Cubana de Aviación Flight 0972, crashed shortly after takeoff from José Martí International Airport in Havana, Cuba. The crash killed 112 of the 113 people on board.
