= Bejuma =

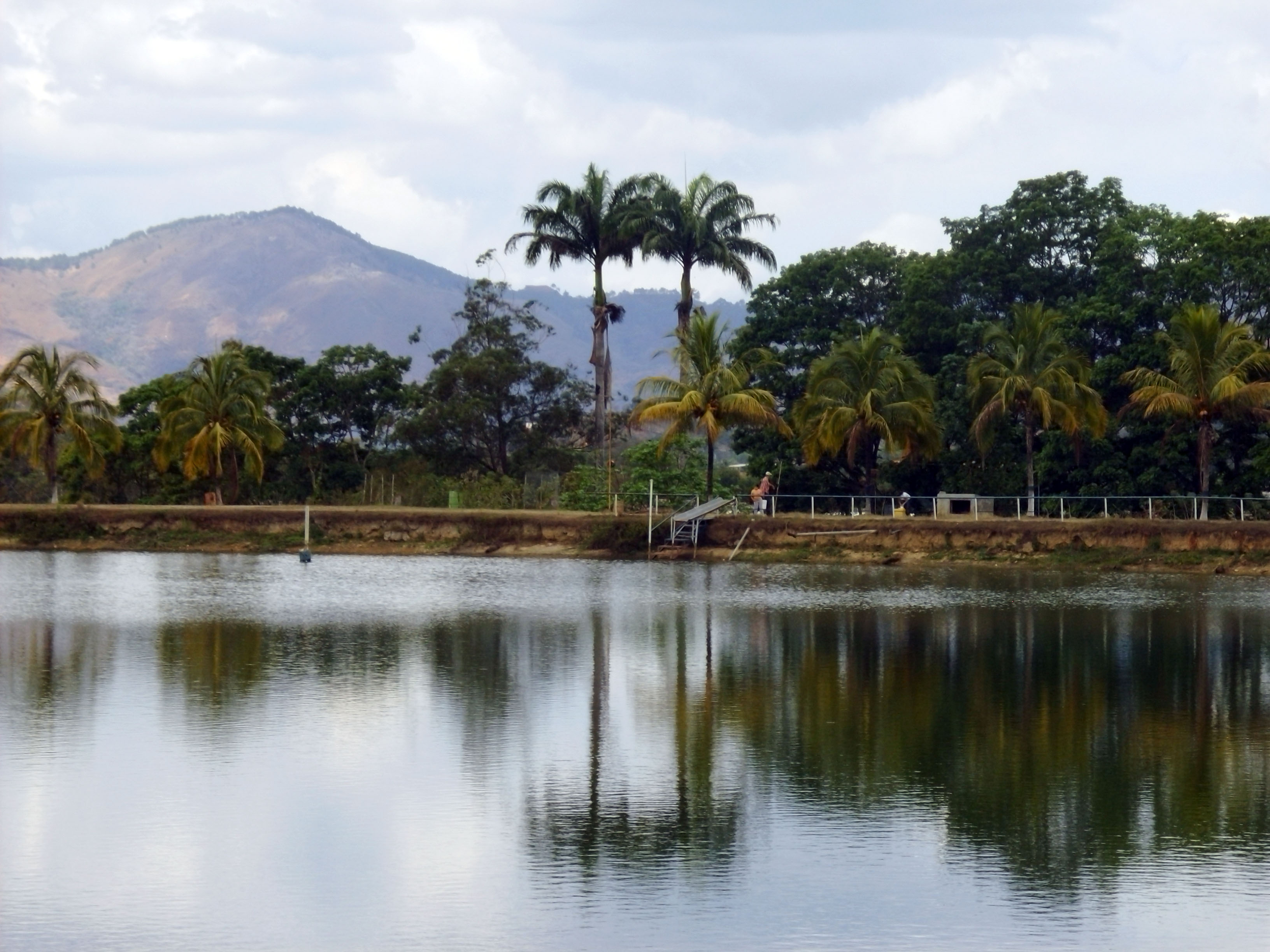
- La Esperanza Lake in Bejuma

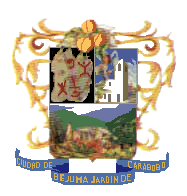
- Flag Coat of arms

- Location within Venezuela
- Coordinates: 10°11′N 68°15′W
- Country: Venezuela
- State: Carabobo
- Municipality: Bejuma Municipality
- Founded: 1843
- Elevation: 667 m (2,188 ft)
- Time zone: UTC−4 (VET)

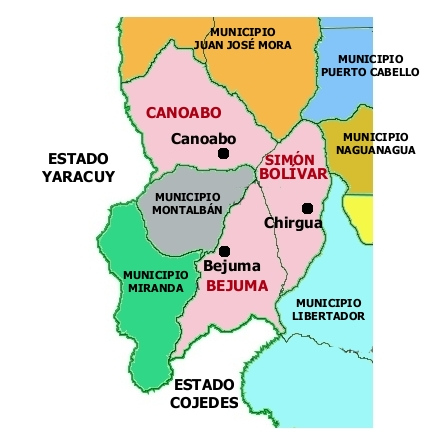
Bejuma

Bejuma is a small town in Carabobo State, Venezuela, seat of the Bejuma Municipality.

== Geography ==
Bejuma is located at 667 metres over sea level.

The municipality of Bejuma lies in the Cordillera La Costa Montane Forests ecoregion, and the major habitat type is tropical and subtropical moist broadleaf forests.

== History ==
The town of Bejuma was founded in 1843 by the landowners of the "Fundo Bejuma" hacienda.

Cubana de Aviación Flight 310, a Yakovlev Yak-42, crashed near Bejuma on 25 December 1999. The plane flew from Havana, Cuba to Simón Bolívar International Airport.

== Economy ==
The economy of the region is based on agriculture. There are also some minor food processing plants in the area.

== Culture ==
The Casa de la Cultura (Culture House) is a building that contains the Atheneum, the public library Manuel Pimentel Coronel and the city museum. The city museum (Museo Pueblos del Occidente de Carabobo or Museum of the Peoples of Western Carabobo) contains objects coming from the original Indian cultures as well as from different later periods of the history of Western Carabobo.

The city also has a theatre, Teatro Palermo, as well as a social centre, Centro Social Bejuma.

== Notable people ==
- Thairo Estrada (born 1996), Major League Baseball player for the Colorado Rockies.

== See also ==
- List of cities and towns in Venezuela
