= Hurricane Tomas =

Category 2 Atlantic hurricane in 2010

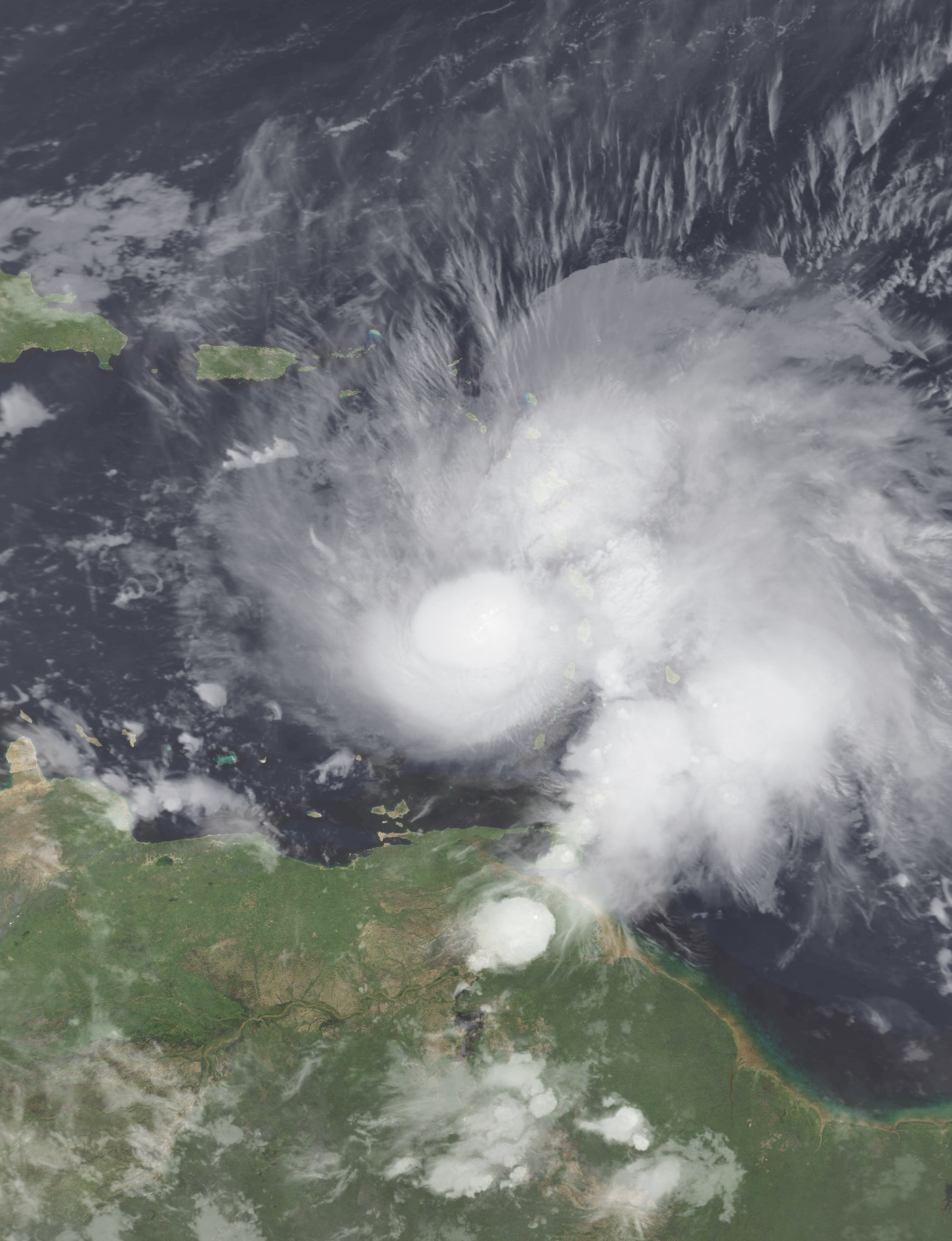
- Tomas at its peak intensity while moving away from Saint Vincent and the Grenadines early on October 31

Meteorological history
- Formed: October 29, 2010
- Extratropical: November 7, 2010
- Dissipated: November 11, 2010

Category 2 hurricane
- 1-minute sustained (SSHWS/NWS)
- Highest winds: 100 mph (155 km/h)
- Lowest pressure: 982 mbar (hPa); 29.00 inHg

Overall effects
- Fatalities: 44 total
- Damage: $463 million (2010 USD)
- Areas affected: Windward Islands, Lesser Antilles, Greater Antilles and Lucayan Archipelago
- IBTrACS
- Part of the 2010 Atlantic hurricane season

Hurricane Tomas was a moderately powerful late-season tropical cyclone which became the latest Atlantic hurricane on record in the calendar year to strike the Windward Islands. The nineteenth named storm and twelfth hurricane of the 2010 Atlantic hurricane season, Tomas developed from a tropical wave east of the Windward Islands on October 29. Quickly intensifying into a hurricane, it moved through the Windward Islands and passed over Saint Lucia. After reaching Category 2 status on the Saffir–Simpson scale, Tomas quickly weakened to a tropical storm in the central Caribbean Sea, due to strong wind shear and dry air. Tomas later reintensified into a hurricane near the Windward passage.

Along the hurricane's path, 44 fatalities occurred, 8 of whom were in Saint Lucia. In the wake of the storm in Haiti, flooding exacerbated a cholera outbreak, indirectly causing more fatalities. However, direct impacts from the hurricane in Haiti were less than anticipated. Overall damage from the storm was $463.4 million.

== Meteorological history ==
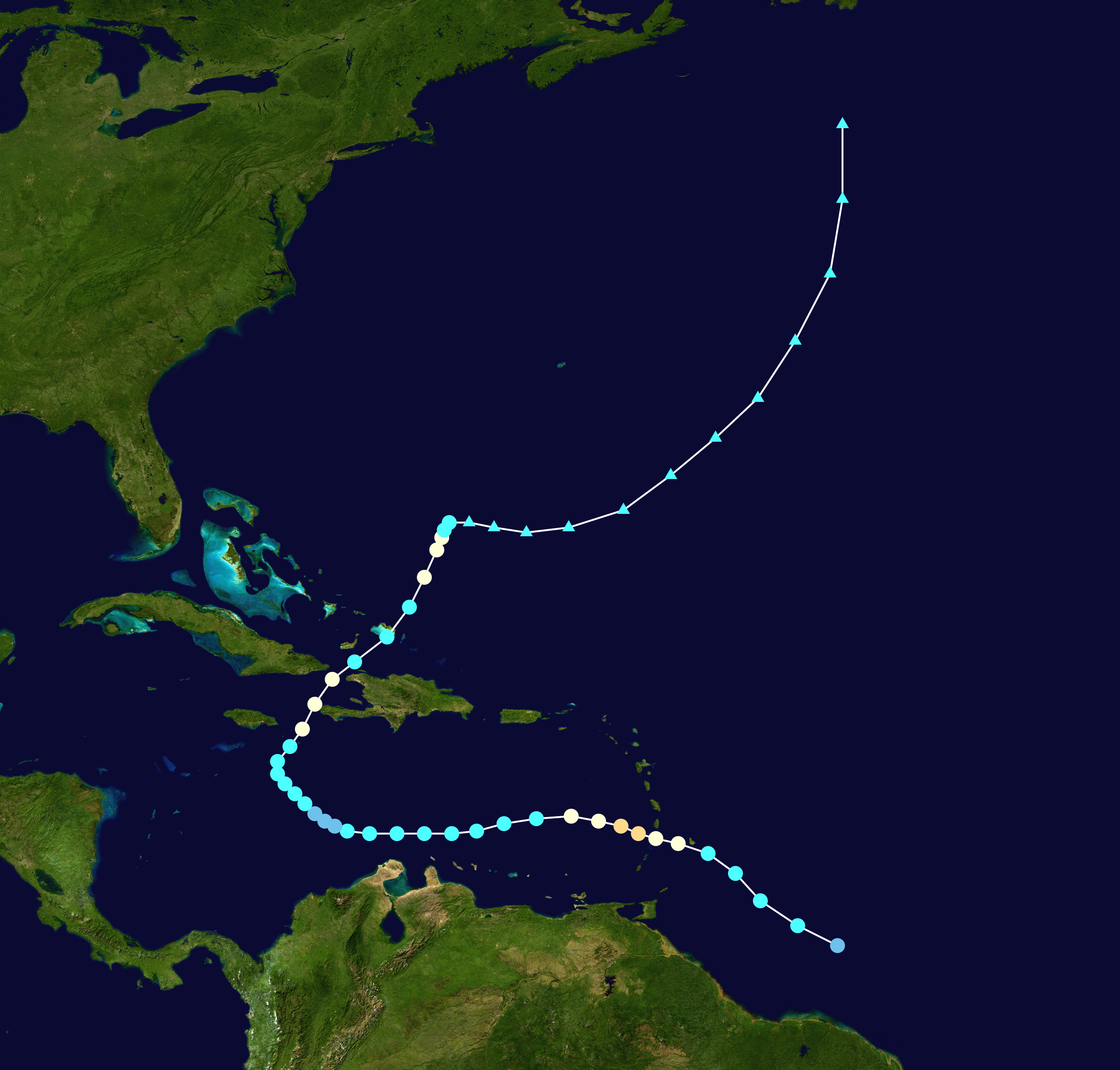
Map plotting the storm's track and intensity, according to the Saffir–Simpson scale Map key Saffir–Simpson scale Tropical depression (≤38 mph, ≤62 km/h) Tropical storm (39–73 mph, 63–118 km/h) Category 1 (74–95 mph, 119–153 km/h) Category 2 (96–110 mph, 154–177 km/h) Category 3 (111–129 mph, 178–208 km/h) Category 4 (130–156 mph, 209–251 km/h) Category 5 (≥157 mph, ≥252 km/h) Unknown Storm type Tropical cyclone Subtropical cyclone Extratropical cyclone, remnant low, tropical disturbance, or monsoon depression

A tropical wave exited the western coast of Africa on October 24. It moved hastily westward across the tropical Atlantic at a comparatively low latitude, becoming embedded within the Intertropical Convergence Zone. During this time the wave's structure retained a vigorous appearance; the western portion contained scattered convection, with strong thunderstorms, as well as a broad area of rotating winds. On October 27, when the system was about 1,200 miles (1,900 km) east-southeast of the Windward Islands, the National Hurricane Center (NHC) noted favorable atmospheric conditions for tropical cyclogenesis, namely light wind shear. The wave and its expansive convection amplified over the next two days, featuring hints of spiraling rainbands. A Hurricane Hunters aircraft investigating the disturbance on October 29 observed a developing circulation with tropical storm-force winds at sea level. In light of those features, the NHC estimated that the system became a tropical depression by 06:00 UTC that day, about 460 mi (740 km) southeast of Barbados, and further upgraded it to Tropical Storm Tomas six hours later.

On its inception, Tomas turned toward the northwest and decelerated within a region of low wind shear and high tropical moisture—two of the prime prerequisites of rapid intensification. A misalignment between the cyclone's low- and upper-level circulations impeded this strengthening potential, however, and at that time the NHC did not expect Tomas to attain hurricane status until 36 to 48 hours later. Steered along high pressure to its north, the storm retraced slightly west-northwestward on its approach to the Windward Islands. Despite the prior forecasts of moderated strengthening, Tomas' winds sharply increased to 60 mph (97 km/h) by late October 29; moreover, the outflow aloft became well established in all quadrants as the convection consolidated into a prominent rain band. The center of the intensifying storm crossed southern Barbados the next morning, around 09:00 UTC. Radar images from Martinique soon revealed the formation of an eye-like feature; Tomas attained hurricane status a couple of hours later, about 35 miles (56 km) east of Saint Vincent and the Grenadines, after Hurricane Hunters recorded surface winds of 75 mph (121 km/h). By that time, the eye measured 35–46 mi (56–74 km) in diameter.

Tomas continued to strengthen through October 30 as it moved generally west- to west-northwestward. Around 20:00 UTC, the eye traversed the northern shores of Saint Vincent, while the northernmost ring of the severest winds skirted Saint Lucia. Subsequent reports from Hurricane Hunters and post-storm reanalysis indicated that Tomas had reached a peak intensity with wind speeds of 100 mph (160 km/h) and a minimum pressure of 982 mbar (hPa; 29.00 inHg) during its trek across the islands, making it a Category 2 on the Saffir–Simpson hurricane scale. Although the NHC noted the potential for Tomas to become a major hurricane, the agency conversely observed that the hurricane had begun to suffer from southwesterly wind shear, which computer models forecast to increase in the long term. On October 31, a combination of this shear and pockets of dry air dispersed the convection surrounding the eye, initiating a weakening trend. Tomas diminished to a tropical storm early on November 1, when the strongest thunderstorms became dislocated from the low-level wind vortex by more than 115 mi (185 km). Tomas meandered slightly south of west for a while, passing north of the ABC Islands overnight. Although the upper wind regime relaxed into the next day, with an area of deep convection briefly reblossoming near Tomas' center, the shear appeared to have already taken its toll on the storm. With an increasingly diffuse and elongated structure, Tomas further weakened to a tropical depression at 00:00 UTC, November 3, about 325 miles (523 km) southeast of Kingston, Jamaica.

Hurricane Tomas moving through the Greater Antilles on November 5

Following its deterioration, Tomas diverged toward the northwest over the central Caribbean. The circulation lost further definition, adjoining a wide stretch of low pressures spanning the western Caribbean. A Hurricane Hunters mission to determine whether Tomas retained its status as a tropical cyclone found that the mean low-level circulation had reformed to the northeast of the previous center. Tomas reattained tropical storm strength late on November 3, and although the low- and mid-level centers were initially nonaligned, slow restrengthening ensued into the next day. Tomas turned northward ahead of an unseasonably strong deep-layered trough, circumnavigating the western periphery of the subtropical ridge. Over a six-hour period, the cyclone's core thunderstorm activity became much more concentrated, with a corresponding quick drop in central pressure. While turning northeastward into the Windward Passage, Tomas regained hurricane status around 0600 UTC on November 5, just 36 miles (58 km) west-southwest of the western tip of Haiti.

Over the course of November 5, the hurricane accelerated northeastward in response to the approaching trough, passing right between eastern Cuba and western Haiti. Due to its proximity to land, the convection became disrupted near the center; Tomas reweakened to a tropical storm near the Turks and Caicos Islands during a spell of moderate shear on November 6. After moving through that island nation, Tomas briefly became a hurricane for a final time before hostile wind shear from the nearby trough fully began to take effect. In conjunction with increasingly dry air, the cyclone steadily weakened to a tropical storm on November 7. Tomas lost its tropical characteristics the next day, though it retained gale-force winds as an extratropical cyclone. It turned sharply eastward before curving northward, accelerated by a broad cyclonic steering flow over the western Atlantic the next couple of days. Tomas' extratropical remnant subsequently raced off into the north Atlantic, until it was absorbed by another extratropical system a few hundred miles south of Newfoundland, Canada, on November 11.

== Preparations ==
Prior to the development of Tomas, the NHC noted the potential for heavy rainfall and strong wind gusts to spread across the Windward Islands, Venezuela, and northern Guyana, due to the tropical wave of which later developed into Hurricane Tomas. Upon development of Tropical Storm Tomas, most of the Windward Islands were put under a tropical storm warning, issued by their respective Governments; a tropical storm watch was also issued for Dominica. Six hours later as Tomas was nearly a hurricane, the tropical storm warning was replaced by a hurricane warning in Barbados, St. Vincent and the Grenadines, St. Lucia, and Martinique; the tropical storm watch in Dominica was also upgraded to a tropical storm warning.

In Barbados, people were able to evacuate to schools and shelters for safety during the storm. On St. Lucia, the government closed the island's two airports and ordered the closure of all businesses. Additionally, a large Creole festival was canceled due to the storm. Officials in Trinidad and Tobago closed beaches across the country. In St. Vincent, the National Emergency Management Organization (NEMO) issued advisories that a tropical system was approaching the country. The rapid intensification of Tomas caught many citizens in St. Vincent off guard. Early on October 30, the Prime Minister addressed the nation and informed the country of the situation it was facing.

Following the west-southwesterly motion of the storm, swells generated by Tomas produced breaking waves on coastal sections of the ABC islands during the morning of November 1. Consequently, a small craft advisory was issued at 1415 UTC for all three islands. In addition, a state of severe weather was declared for Bonaire and Curaçao during the passage of Tomas. In Haiti, the country which was devastated earlier in the year from a deadly January 12 earthquake, government officials began preparing for possible impact from Tomas by October 30. One United Nations spokesperson remarked that a hurricane strike would be "the last thing Haiti needs". The Haitian government issued an orange storm alert, one level short of the highest state of alert, and warned for the possibility of winds, thunderstorms, and flooding.

== Impact ==
Impact by country or region
County/Region	Deaths	Damage	Source
Barbados	None	$8.5 million	
Cuba	None	Unknown	
Curaçao	1	$115 million	
Haiti	35	Unknown	
Martinique	None	Minimal	
Saint Vincent and the Grenadines	None	$3.3 million	
Saint Lucia	8	$336 million	
Trinidad and Tobago	None	$629,000	
Total	44	$463 million	

=== Lesser Antilles ===
As Tomas passed 20 miles (32 km) to the south of Barbados, it produced a wind gust of 63 mph (101 km/h), which damaged homes and power lines on the island. There were also reports of blown off roofs, impassable roads and uprooted trees. Later, a station on Saint Lucia recorded sustained winds of 48 mph (77 km/h), with gusts to 69 mph (111 km/h). There was widespread damage to homes and power lines. The winds destroyed the roof of a hospital and a school, with several trees and power lines blown down. Additionally, a station on Martinique reported sustained winds of 72 mph (116 km/h), with gusts to 108 mph (174 km/h).

On Saint Vincent, there were no deaths but two persons sustained serious injuries while trying to effect repairs to house roofs and two persons were reported missing. The two persons reported missing were found on November 1, off the island of Balliceaux. The National Emergency Management Organization (NEMO) declared all areas from Park Hill to Owia on the eastern side and all areas from Belle Isle to Fitz Hughes on the western side disaster zones. It was also reported that the agriculture sector sustained over US$25 million(EC$67 million) worth of damage. Over 1200 people were forced to seek refuge in hurricane shelters across St. Vincent. About 600 houses lost their roofs. A lot of downed power lines, trees and landslides made some roads impassable but NEMO, the Bridges Roads and General Services Authority (BRAGSA) and the St. Vincent Electricity Services Company (VINLEC) were able to clear the main road by the November 1.

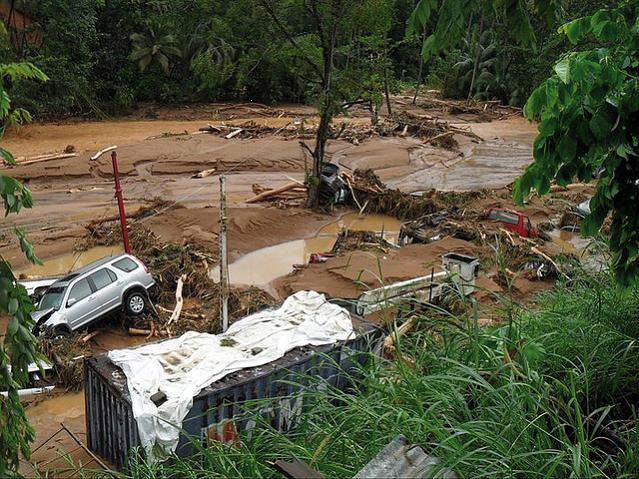
Flood damage along the Cul de Sac River in Saint Lucia

Saint Lucia arguably had sustained the worst damage from the storm overall. Throughout Saint Lucia, severe flooding and mudslides resulted in at least 7 fatalities confirmed by the Chief Medical Officer. According to a government minister, several other people were missing and buried in landslides. By the morning of November 2, two more fatalities were confirmed on the island.

Although the storm did not directly strike the ABC islands, one of its outer rainbands stalled over the region and intensified during the night of November 1 to 2. Curaçao experienced its most extreme rain event in 40 years; as many as 10.4 inches (260 mm) were recorded over a 24-hour period in the eastern part of the island. The majority of the rain fell overnight in a heavy downpour, accompanied by a severe thunderstorm that triggered large-scale power, TV and radio outages. Lightning strikes sparked three large fires in a major oil refinery in Willemstad. The fires inflicted severe damage to several tanks, estimated at US$10 million. Flights from Curaçao International Airport were delayed due to the hazardous conditions.

Following hours of heavy rainfall, widespread floods made most roads in the region impassable, with dozens of cars swept away or stranded. The rains filled dams and overwhelmed drains, causing them to overflow and exacerbating the flooding. The towns of Saliña, Brievengat and Mahaai were among the hardest hit; hundreds of homes, gardens and businesses were inundated. At the height of the rainstorm, a rescue worker assisting in the evacuation of a hospital was killed by the collapse of a wall. An elderly man suffering a heart attack drowned while unable to exit his flooded car. Overall, Curaçao suffered some of its worst flooding in history; insured losses across the island exceeded NAƒ110 million (US$63 million), though total damage costs from Tomas were estimated at NAƒ200 million (US$115 million).

Damage on the other two islands was much more limited. Parts of Bonaire experienced heavy but brief periods of rain, with a maximum of 3 inches (76 mm) at Flamingo International Airport, causing localized flooding of property. On Aruba, some thunder and moderate rainfall occurred, without significant consequences. All schools across the islands were closed on November 2 and 3 as a result of the storm.

While passing the Windward Islands into the Caribbean Sea, Tomas produced strong winds and heavy rainfall on Isla Aves, located off the northern coast of Venezuela.

=== Greater Antilles ===
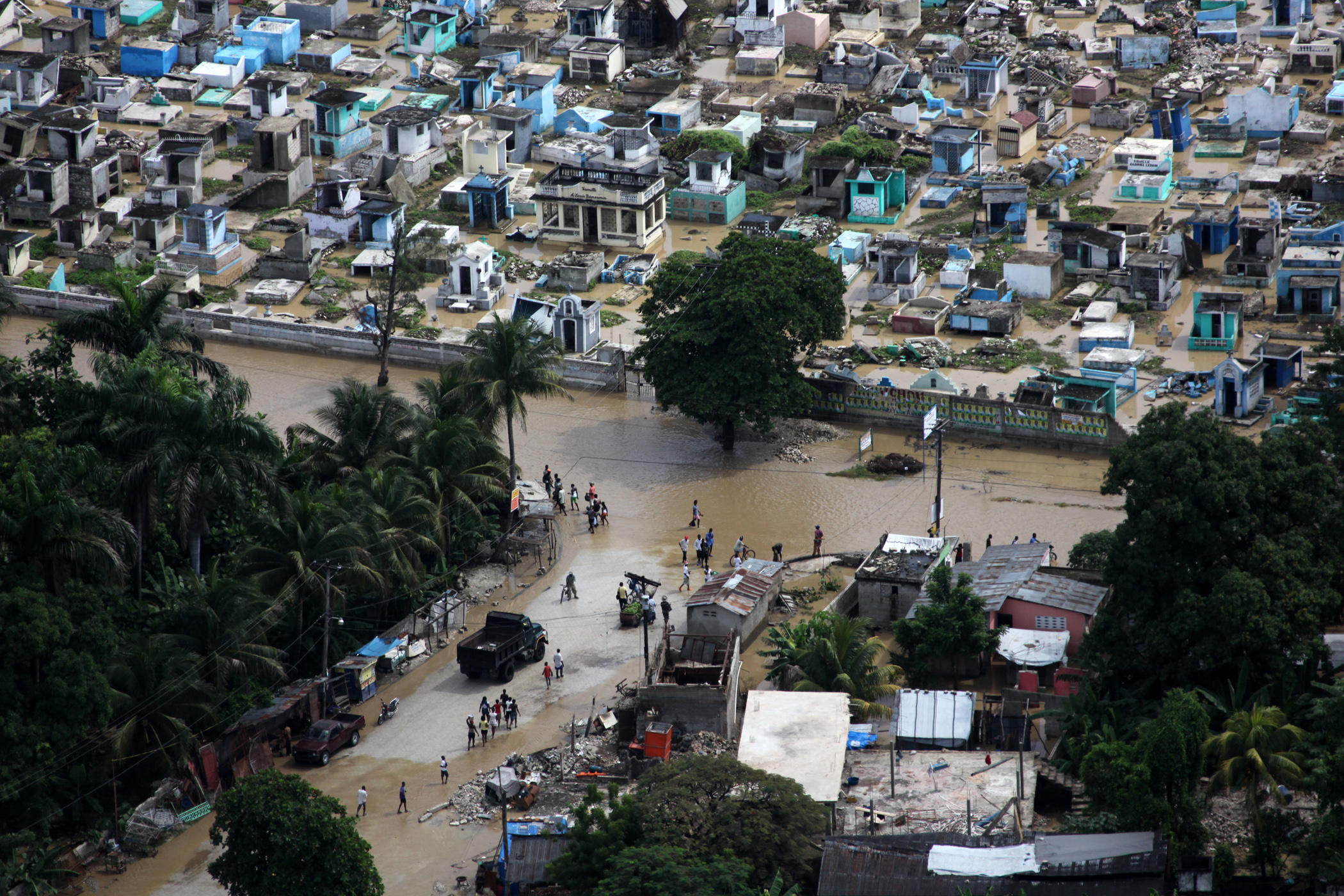
Flooding from Tomas in Port-Au-Prince, Haiti, on November 6

After days of anticipation, Tomas arrived just offshore in Haiti on the morning of November 5. The storm intensified while brushing the disaster-weary nation, reattaining hurricane strength near the westernmost tip of Haiti. Torrential rains and tropical storm force winds buffeted the entire region. Within hours of the storm's arrival, flooding began to occur. In earthquake-ravaged Port-au-Prince, one of the largest refugee camps set up near the ruins of the capitol building was flooded following heavy rains. By the evening of November 8, 20 people had been confirmed dead, 7 others were listed as missing and more than 30,000 people were in shelters. Health workers also feared damage related to Tomas on the island could exacerbate the ongoing cholera outbreak.

Tomas passed just to the east of Cuba hours later, but no significant damage was reported on the island. As the outer bands of Hurricane Tomas began to impact Cuba, Aero Caribbean Flight 883, an ATR-72-212 aircraft, crashed near the town of Guasimal in Sancti Spíritus province. All 68 people on board the plane were killed on impact. Although the plane was the last to leave the airport in Santiago de Cuba before it closed due to Tomas, it is unknown what role, if any, the storm played in the crash. Following a review of the crash, it was determined that severe ice accumulation, at an altitude of 20,000 ft (6,100 m), along with errors by the crew caused the incident.

=== Elsewhere ===
Hurricane Tomas narrowly missed the Turks and Caicos, sparing the islands a direct hit and causing only minor flooding.

== Aftermath ==
Estimates place the cost of damage in Barbados at BBD$17 million (~US$8.5 million). Throughout the northern part of St. Vincent, the entire banana crop was lost. Press reports from the Prime Minister revealed that nearly every banana tree had been downed during the storm. The country's banana crop is a major source of income and jobs, accounting for roughly 60% of the workforce and 50% of the merchandise exported.

Damage from the storm on Trinidad and Tobago amounted to TTD$4 million (US$629,000). Losses in Barbados reached BBD$17 million (US$8.4 million). The Government of St. Lucia stated that damage from the storm could exceed US$100 million. By November 5, the Prime Minister stated that damage from Tomas was roughly EC$1.3 billion (US$500 million), five times higher than initially stated.

=== Retirement ===
Due to the extent of damage across the Caribbean, the name Tomas was retired from the 6-year rotating list of Atlantic hurricane names by the World Meteorological Organization in March 2011, and will never again be used as a storm name in the Atlantic basin. It was replaced with Tobias for the 2016 season.

== See also ==
- List of Category 2 Atlantic hurricanes
- Timeline of the 2010 Atlantic hurricane season
- Hurricane Hazel (1954)
- Hurricane Noel (2007)
- Hurricane Matthew (2016)
