= 1992 Aero Caribbean Ilyushin Il-18 crash =

1992 aviation accident in Dominican Republic

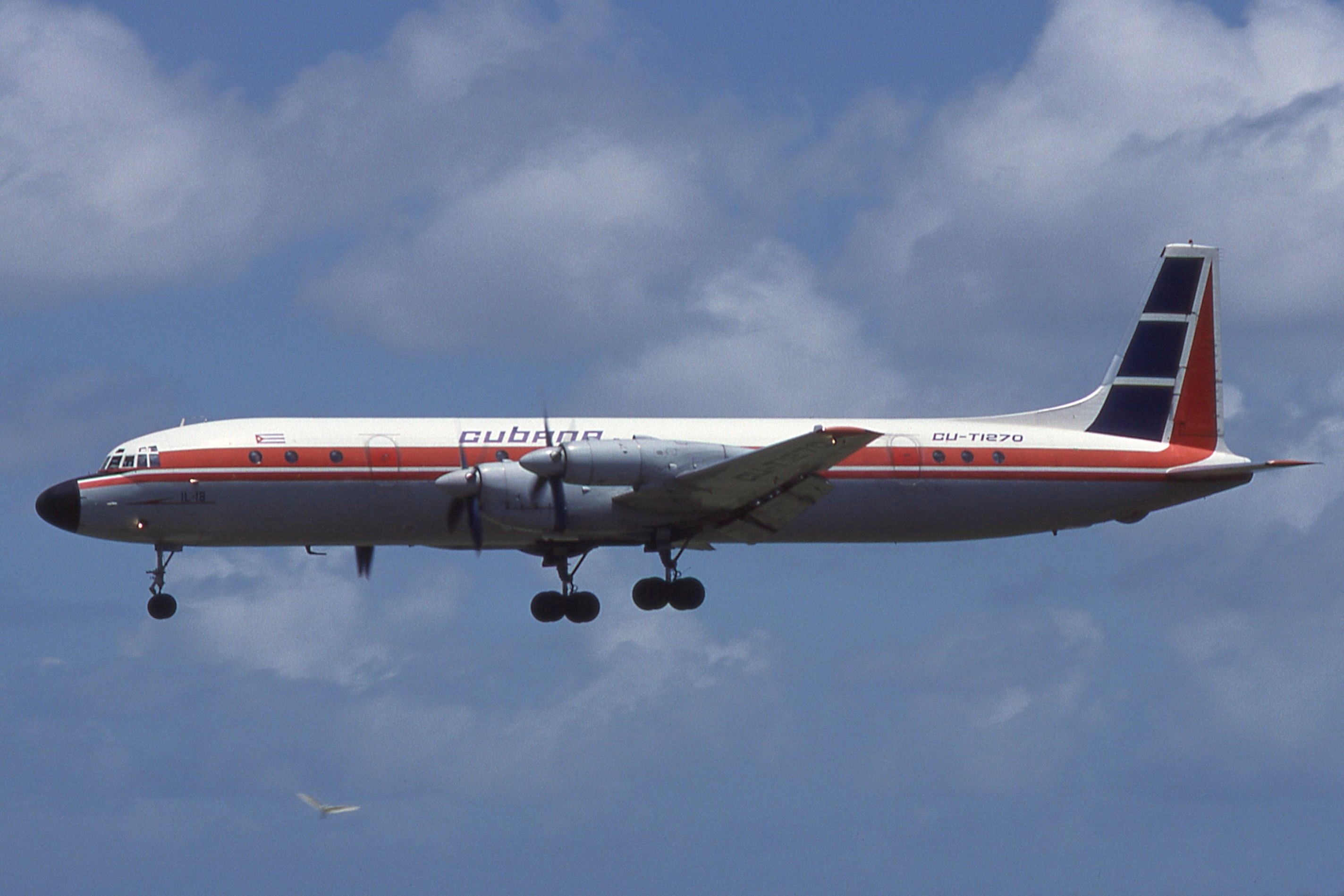
- CU-T1270, the aircraft involved in the accident, photographed in 1990 previously with Cubana de Aviación

Accident
- Date: 15 November 1992
- Summary: Controlled flight into terrain
- Site: Isabel de Torres, Puerto Plata, Dominican Republic

Aircraft
- Aircraft type: Ilyushin Il-18D
- Operator: Aero Caribbean
- Registration: CU-T1270 (Note: Most sources are referred as 11-18CUTL-270)
- Flight origin: Las Américas International Airport, Santo Domingo, Dominican Republic
- Stopover: Gregorio Luperón International Airport, Puerto Plata, Dominican Republic
- Destination: José Martí International Airport, Havana, Cuba
- Occupants: 34
- Passengers: 28
- Crew: 6
- Fatalities: 34
- Survivors: 0

On 15 November 1992, an Aero Caribbean Ilyushin Il-18, operating a charter flight from Las Américas International Airport, Dominican Republic to José Martí International Airport, Cuba, with a stopover in Gregorio Luperón International Airport, crashed into the side of a mountain killing all 28 passengers and 6 crew on board.

== Background ==
The Ilyushin Il-18D with registration CU-T1270 and c/n 187010301 was manufactured by Znamya Truda Plant on 1967 the same plane that was filmed in 1986 Soviet disaster film Razmakh krylyev (Wingspan). At the time of their transfer to Cuba, it had accumulated 22,016 flight hours.

The aircraft was carrying sportsperson enroute to Havana for a match. Some passengers were identified as chess coach Adelquis Remón, former basketball president, doctors Cristóbal Merette Luna, and six members of the chess club based in San Francisco de Macorís. The captain was Rolande Flete.

Nationality	Passengers	Crew	Total
Cuba	10	6	16
Dominican Republic	16	0	16
Italy	2	0	2
Total	28	6	34

== Accident ==
The flight was approaching Puerto Plata from the southeast. The intention was to make a VOR approach to runway 26, break away from the approach pattern near the airport, go around it, and land on runway 08. The last contact with the aircraft was when the crew reported that they had turned onto the basic part of the approach nine nautical miles from the start of the runway. Shortly after turning onto the final part of the approach, the aircraft struck Isabel de Torres Hill at approximately 18:45 local time. The maximum allowed distance for turning onto the basic part was four nautical miles.

The crash into a hill wall with almost full fuel caused a large explosion, killing all 34 people on board. Rescue efforts began on the evening of the crash, but were suspended due to bad weather. Civil defense authorities, the Red Cross, the fire department, and Dominican Air Force participated in the recovery of the victims' bodies.

== Probable cause ==
The probable cause was ascribed to pilot error in not properly monitoring the aircraft’s descent rate during approach in nighttime instrument meteorological conditions (IMC), causing the aircraft to descend below the minimum safe altitude and collide with terrain near Mount Isabel de Torres.
