= Aero Caribbean =

Cuban airline

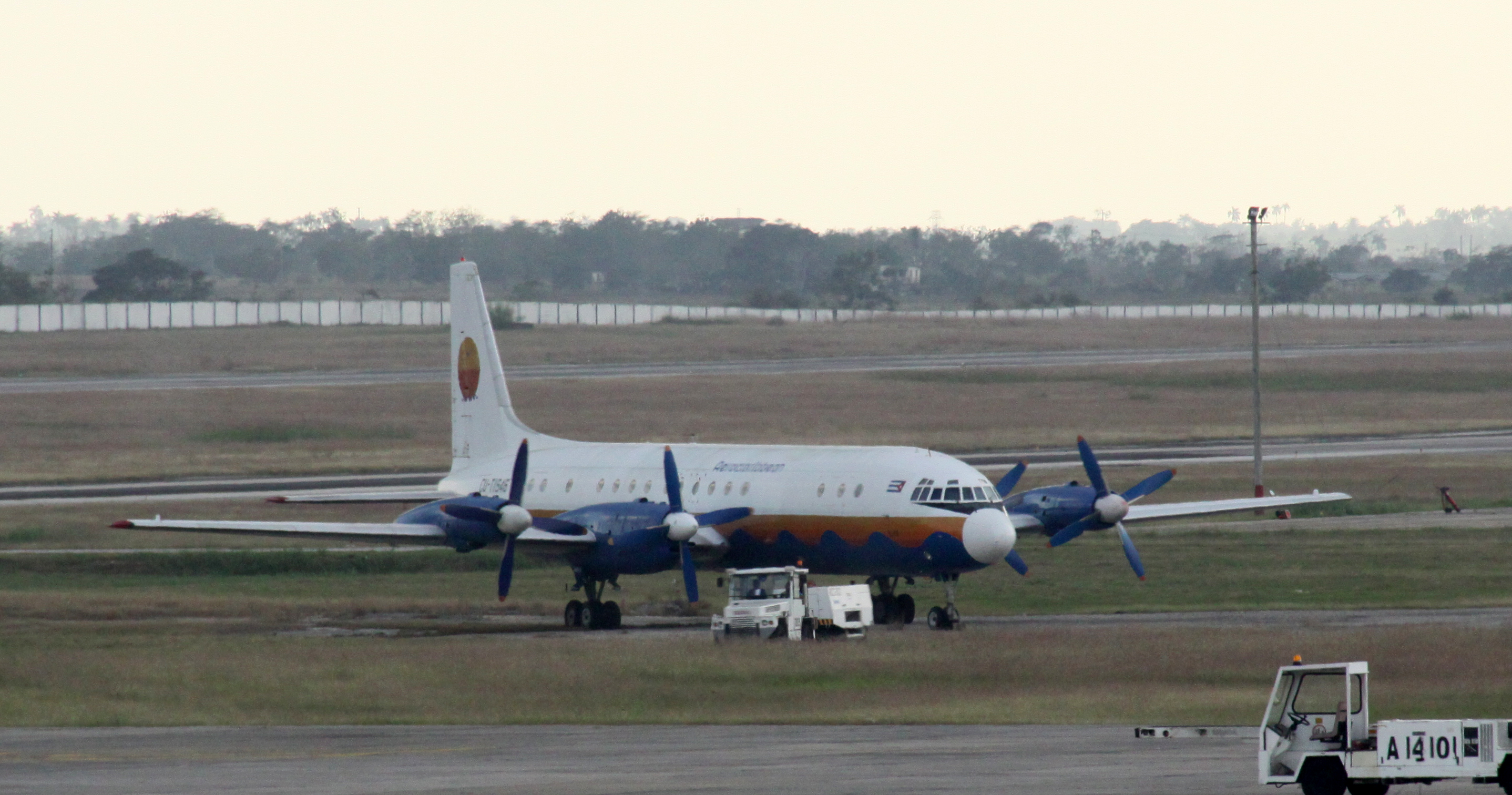
IATA	ICAO	Call sign
7L	CRN	AEROCARIBBEAN
- Founded: 1982
- Ceased operations: 2015 (merged with Cubana de Aviación)
- Hubs: José Martí International Airport
- Focus cities: Antonio Maceo Int'l Airport
- Subsidiaries: Aero Caribbean Cargo
- Fleet size: 7
- Destinations: 17
- Parent company: Corporación de la Aviación Civil S.A
- Headquarters: Plaza de la Revolución, Havana, Cuba

Aero Caribbean (Empresa Aerocaribbean SA) was an airline based in Vedado, Plaza de la Revolución, Havana, Cuba. It operated scheduled domestic and international passenger services, and charter flights mainly within the Caribbean and South America. Its main base was at José Martí International Airport, Havana.

== History ==
The airline was established in 1982 as Empresa Aero and started operations on 2 December 1982. It was set up by the Cuban government to provide domestic flights and regional charters to supplement national carrier Cubana. It was wholly owned by the government of Cuba. It merged with Cubana de Aviación in 2015.

== Destinations ==
Aero Caribbean operated the following destinations:

- Domestic scheduled destinations: Cayo Coco, Havana, Holguín, Santiago de Cuba, Cayo Largo, Nueva Gerona, Varadero.
- International scheduled destinations: Cayman Islands, Corn Island, Managua, Mérida, San Pedro Sula, Port-au-Prince, Santo Domingo, Punta Cana, Guatemala City
- Former scheduled destinations: Monterrey, Tijuana

== Fleet ==
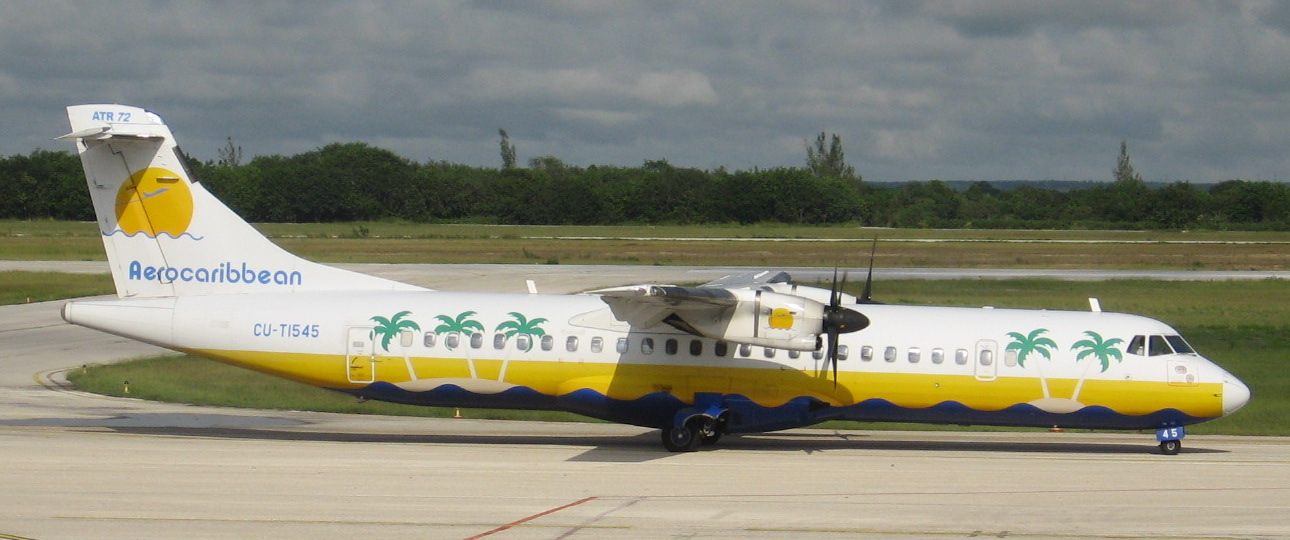
Aero Caribbean ATR 72-212

The Aero Caribbean fleet included the following aircraft (as of November 2012):

- 3 ATR 42-300
- 4 ATR 72-212

=== Previously operated ===
Aerocaribbean operated the following aircraft in the past:

- 1 Antonov An-24
- 2 Antonov An-26
- 1 Boeing 737-200
- 2 Bristol Britannia
- 2 Douglas DC-3 configured for Y28 passengers
- 4 Embraer EMB-110 Bandeirante
- 1 Fokker F-27F Friendship configured for Y44 passengers/freight
- 1 Ilyushin Il-14M configured for Y40 passengers
- 5 Ilyushin Il-18D/V configured for Y100 passengers/freight (flying Havana-Bahamas and Havana-Caracas)
- 6 Yakovlev Yak-40 configured for Y30 passengers/freighter

== Accidents and incidents ==
- On 15 November 1992, an Il-18 on a charter flight from Santo Domingo to Havana crashed into the side of mount Isabel de Torres, near San Felipe de Puerto Plata, while on approach to Gregorio Luperón International Airport for an intermediate stop. The plane was flying in IFR conditions and performed a controlled flight into terrain. All 34 on board died, including the Dominican chess team. The aircraft lost in the accident was the same plane that was filmed in 1986 Soviet disaster film Razmakh krylyev.
- On 4 November 2010, Flight 883, operated by an ATR 72-212, crashed at Guasimal, Cuba, while en route from Santiago de Cuba to Havana. All 61 passengers and seven crew members were killed. The most likely cause was icing on the wing.
