= Iglesia Parroquial Mayor del Espíritu Santo =

Main Parish Church of Sancti Spiritus
- Iglesia Parroquial Mayor del Espíritu Santo
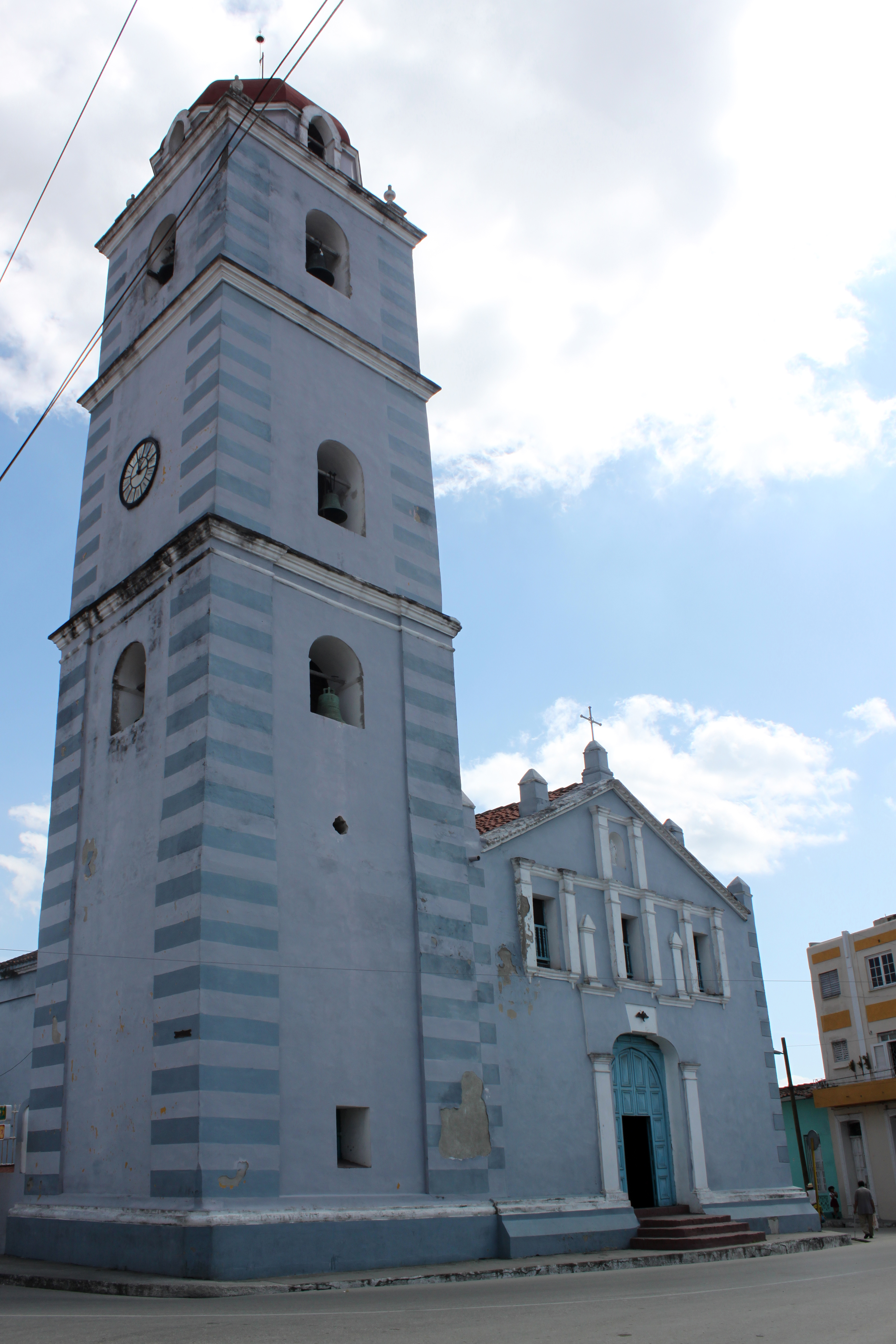
- Main Parish Church of Sancti Spiritus
- 21°55′31″N 79°26′36″W
- Location: Sancti Spíritus
- Country: Cuba

History
- Founded: 1522

The Iglesia Parroquial Mayor del Espíritu Santo (English: Main Parish Church of the Holy Spirit), also known as the Sancti Spiritus Main Parish Church or simply the Parroquial Mayor, is a historic Catholic parish church located in the province of Sancti Spíritus and the oldest church in Cuba.

== History ==
Located in the town of Sancti Spíritus, within Sancti Spíritus Province, central Cuba, it is situated on the Plaza Honorato del Castillo. It is two blocks south of the town's main square.

Built in 1522, the Parish Church of Sancti Spíritus was originally constructed out of wood. Following its destruction by pirates, the church was rebuilt in stone in 1680. The 36-meter high bell tower, featuring gold, silver, and bronze bells, was added in the 18th century, with the cupola completed in the 19th century.

== Gallery ==
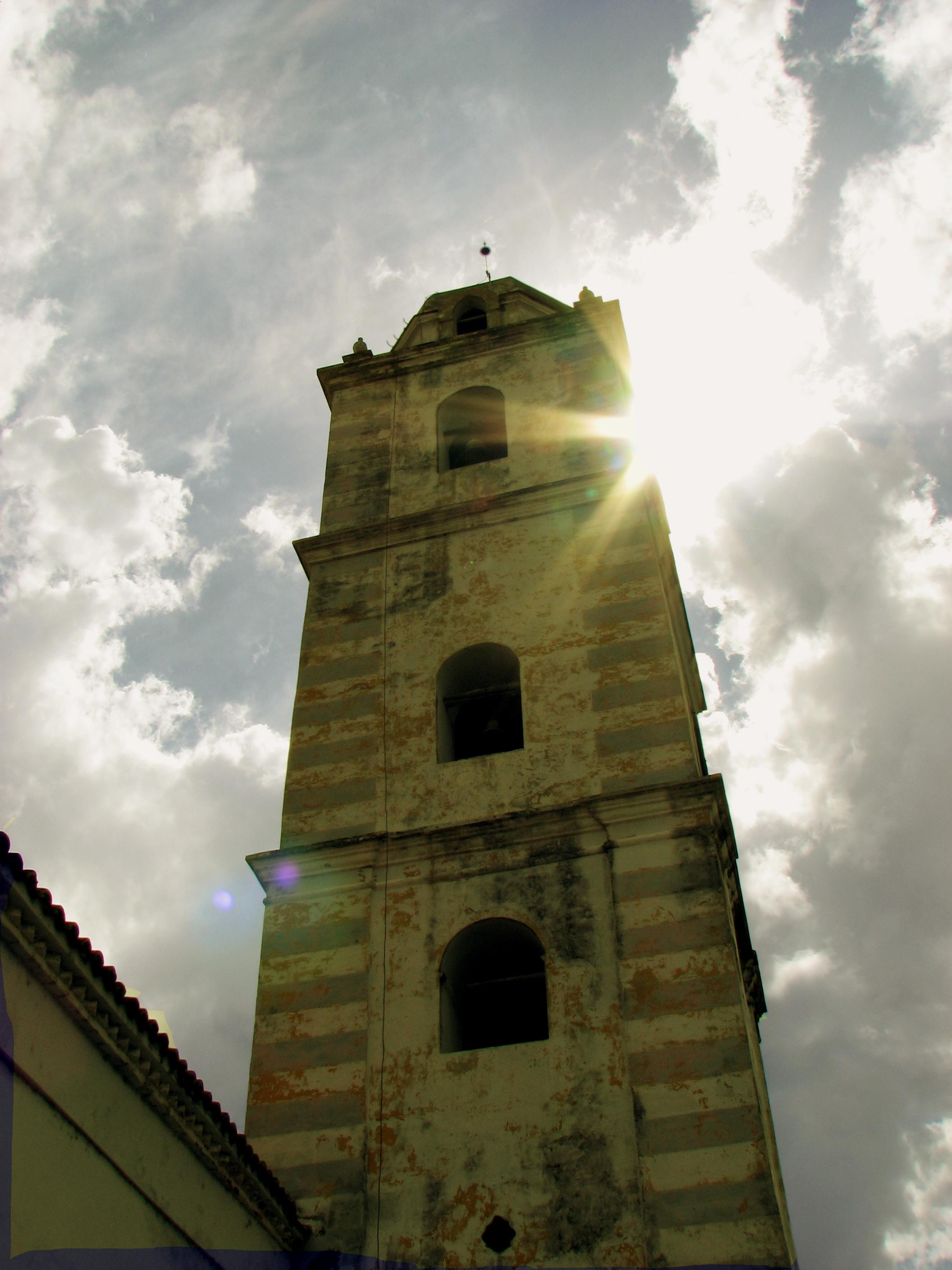

== See also ==
- Sancti Spiritus
