= Aero Caribbean Flight 883 =

2010 aviation accident

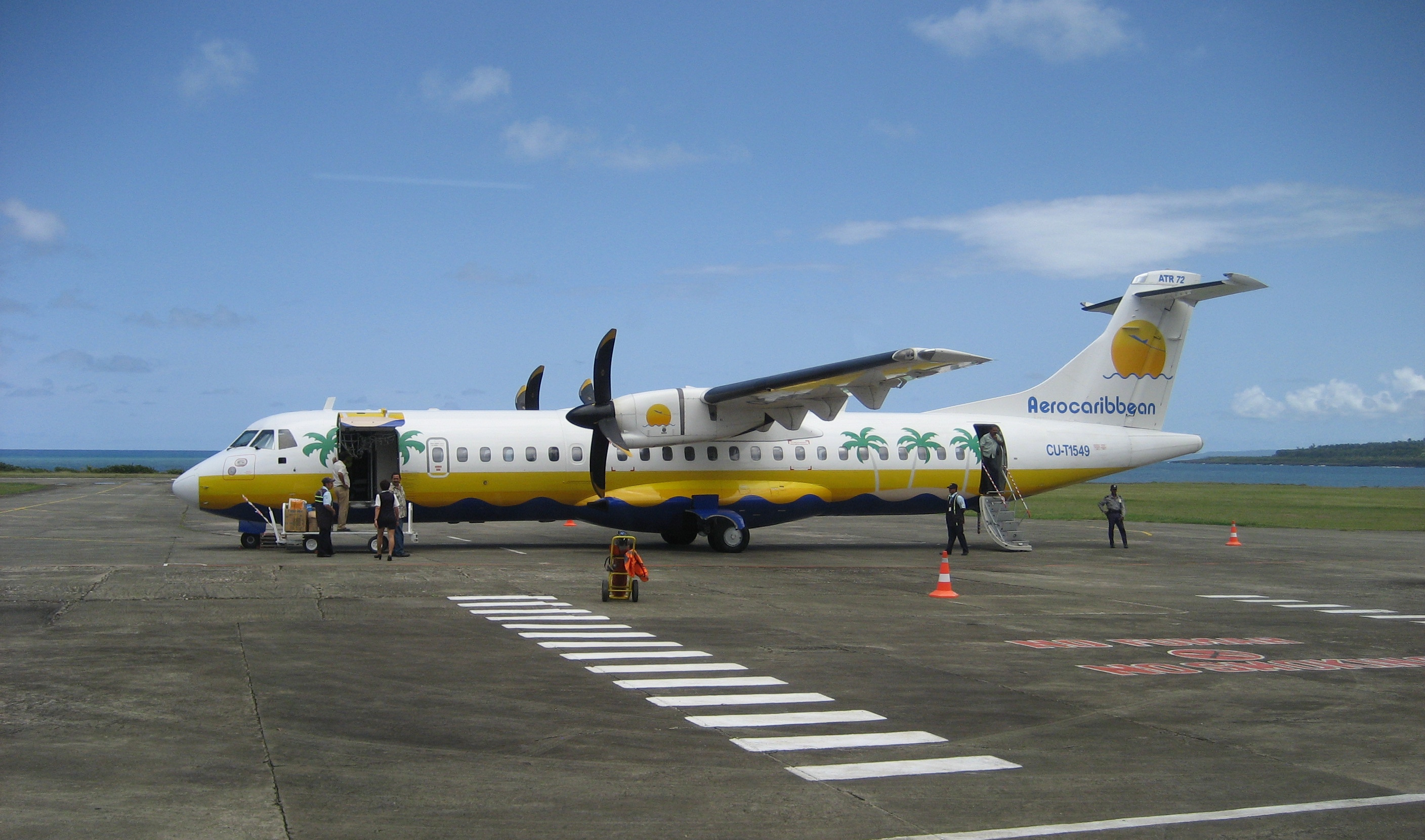
- CU-T1549, the aircraft involved, at Baracoa Airport in 2007

Accident
- Date: 4 November 2010
- Summary: Crashed following loss of control in icing conditions
- Site: Near Guasimal, Sancti Spíritus, Cuba; 21°44′39″N 79°28′16″W

Aircraft
- Aircraft type: ATR 72-212
- Operator: Aero Caribbean
- IATA flight No.: 7L883
- ICAO flight No.: CRN883
- Call sign: AEROCARIBBEAN 883
- Registration: CU-T1549
- Flight origin: Toussaint Louverture International Airport, Port-au-Prince, Haiti
- Stopover: Antonio Maceo Airport, Santiago de Cuba, Cuba
- Destination: José Martí International Airport, Havana, Cuba
- Occupants: 68
- Passengers: 61
- Crew: 7
- Fatalities: 68
- Survivors: 0

Aero Caribbean Flight 883 was an international scheduled passenger service from Port-au-Prince, Haiti to Havana, Cuba with a stopover in Santiago de Cuba. On 4 November 2010, the ATR 72 operating the route crashed in the central Cuban province of Sancti Spíritus, killing all 61 passengers and 7 crew members aboard. Along with American Eagle Flight 4184 it was the worst crash in ATR 72 history until Yeti Airlines Flight 691 crashed 12 years later killing 72 passengers and crew.

== Accident ==
The aircraft departed Santiago de Cuba en route to Havana around 16:50 local time (20:50 UTC). It was the last flight out of Santiago de Cuba airport before it was closed because of the approach of Hurricane Tomas. At 17:42, the aircraft crashed near the village of Guasimal in Sancti Spíritus province, some 210 miles (340 km) southeast of Havana, after issuing a distress call. Witnesses said the plane was "flying low and appeared unstable ... pouring out smoke and fire", before hearing an explosion.

Medical facilities in Guasimal were put on alert to prepare for emergency patients. However, by midnight they were told to stand down as no survivors were expected.

== Aircraft ==
The aircraft involved was a twin-turboprop ATR 72-212 with Cuban registration CU-T1549, in use with Cuba-based Aero Caribbean since October 2006. According to the manufacturer, the plane had accumulated almost 25,000 flight hours in more than 34,500 flights. Aero Caribbean was wholly owned by the government of Cuba.

== Passengers and crew ==
In command of the ATR was Captain Ángel Villa Martínez, and the co-pilot was First Officer Luis Lima Rodríguez. In the passenger cabin were flight attendants Raciel Echevarría, María Torres, Fara Guillén, Juan Carlos Banderas and Andy César Galano. On board were 61 passengers of different nationalities, most of them Cuban.

The passengers and crew were of the following nationalities:

Nationality	Passengers	Crew	Total
Cuba	33	7	40
Argentina	10	–	10
Mexico	7	–	7
Netherlands	3	–	3
Australia	2	–	2
France	1	–	1
Germany	1	–	1
Italy	1	–	1
Japan	1	–	1
Spain	1	–	1
Venezuela	1	–	1
Total	61	7	68

== Search and recovery ==
In order to allow access to the crash site, rescue workers had to use bulldozers to plow through thick vegetation. The aircraft was completely destroyed by the impact and resulting explosion, and all the victims' bodies were badly burned. Investigators believe that the passengers had no time to react because all bodies were found in their own seats, which helped investigators with identifications. The wreckage burned for hours after the crash. The recovered bodies were to be sent to Cuba's Institute of Legal Medicine for identification.

The day after the crash, on 5 November, rescue workers recovered the flight data and cockpit voice recorders. They were turned over to investigators for inspection and analysis.

== Reactions ==
Argentine President Cristina Fernández de Kirchner sent a plane with relatives of the victims to bring home the bodies. Spanish Prime Minister José Luis Rodríguez Zapatero, South African President Jacob Zuma, Polish President Bronisław Komorowski and French Foreign Minister Bernard Kouchner, in a message addressing Cuban Foreign Affairs Minister Bruno Rodríguez Parrilla, all sent condolences.

== Investigation ==
The Civil Aviation Institute of Cuba (IACC) investigated the accident with assistance from aircraft manufacturer ATR and the French Bureau of Enquiry and Analysis for Civil Aviation Safety (BEA).

In December 2010, the IACC stated that the analysis of the flight recorders did not highlight any technical problem with the ATR 72. The airplane encountered severe icing conditions at 20,000 feet (6,100 m), which were not handled properly, leading to the crash.

== See also ==
- American Eagle Flight 4184, TransAsia Airways Flight 791, West Wind Aviation Flight 282 and Voepass Linhas Aéreas Flight 2283, other ATR 72's that crashed due to icing.
- Aero Trasporti Italiani Flight 460, an ATR-42 that crashed due to icing in Italy.
