= Cecilia Caballero Navarro =

Cuban judoka

- Born: Vedado, Havana, Cuba
- Occupation: Judoka

Cecilia Susana Caballero Navarro is a Cuban judoka. She won a medal from both the 1984 and 1986 Pan American Judo Championships.

== Medals ==
Pan American Judo Championships
Year	Location	Medal	Category	Source
1984	Mexico City (Mexico)	Bronze	–66 kg	
1986	Salinas (Puerto Rico)	Silver	–66 kg	
