= Cohiba Hotel =

Building in Havana, Cuba

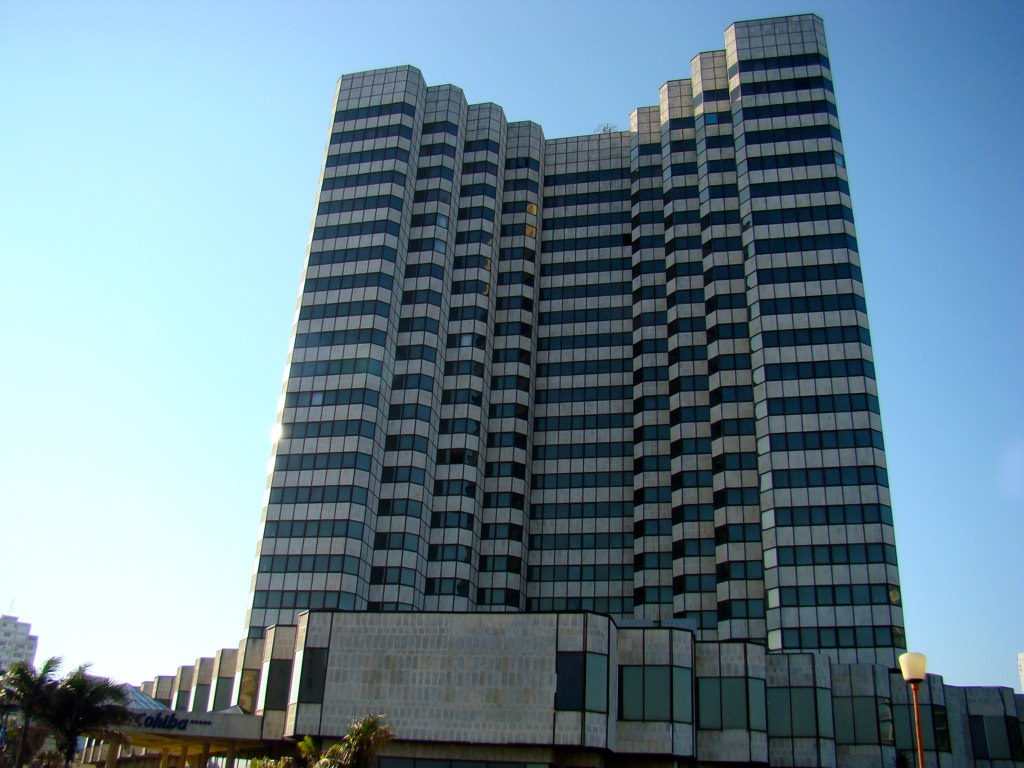

General information
- Location: Havana, Cuba
- Coordinates: 23.13964°N 82.40278°W
- Opening: 1994

Other information
- Number of rooms: 462 (inc)
- Number of suites: 61
- Number of restaurants: 7

The Cohiba Hotel is a high-rise hotel opened in 1994, located in the Vedado district of Havana, Cuba, just off the Malecón and next to the historic Hotel Habana Riviera. The hotel has 401 rooms and 61 suites. The hotel's sharp angles and alternating walls of stone and glass make it one of the more modern buildings in Havana. The Cohiba has a wide range of restaurants and shops, as the Habanos Cigar Store. The Habana Café has a nightly floor show and live music.

From 1994-2026, it operated as the Meliá Cohiba Hotel, managed by Meliá Hotels International, until that company pulled out of Cuba entirely on July 24, 2026.
