= Facultad de Ciencias Medicas Sancti Spiritus =

Coordinates: 21°56′38″N 79°26′10″W

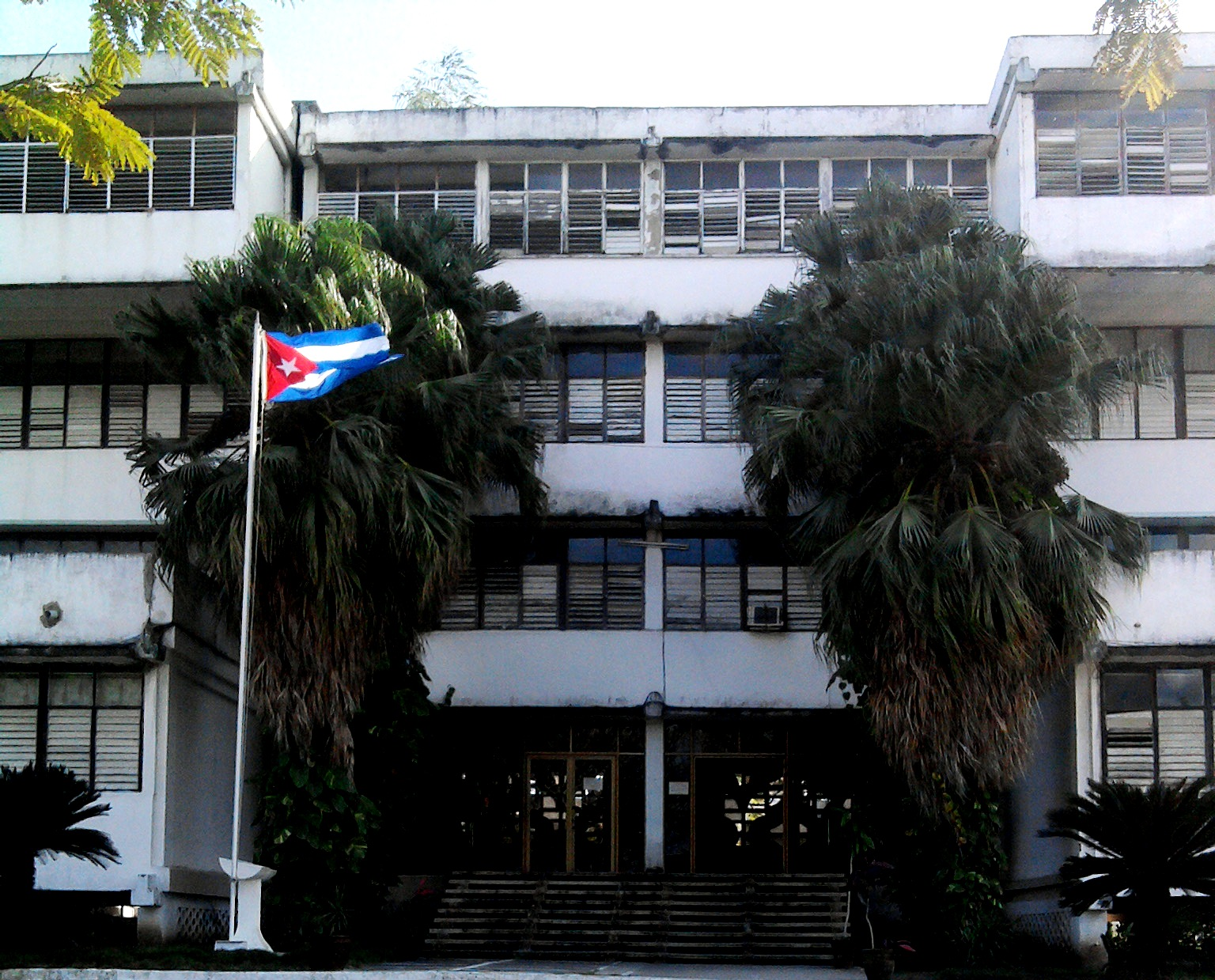
Main entrance of FCM Sancti Spiritus

Facultad de Ciencias Médicas de Sancti Spíritus also called Universidad de Ciencias Médicas de Sancti Spíritus is a medical school established in 1986 located in Sancti Spíritus, capital city of Sancti Spíritus Province, Cuba.

== Students ==
A large number of foreign students have been registered since its foundation. Currently the university holds more than 700 foreign students from all over continents. First time in the history of Cuba one thousand students were registered from Pakistan of which more than 300 students recently in 2015 completed their graduation as medical doctors from UCM of sancti spiritus affiliated with ELAM. This faculty is affiliated with ELAM (Latin American School of Medicine) Cuba in the capital city of Havana.

== Students graduated in 2018 ==
Cuba continues to invest in health and human resources not for its own national also a number of foreigners come across the globe, get higher studies especialities in medical related fields. July 20,2018 was another landmark for this ELAM medical faculty when more than 290 medical students received their graduated diploma, among these students more than 44 newly formed doctors from 17 countries completed their medicine degrees. The school currently has over 5,000 students enrolled in its graduate and undergraduate programs. 2,600 of the students are enrolled in the University of Medical Sciences.
