= Honorato del Castillo =

Cuban revolutionary and army general (1838–1869)

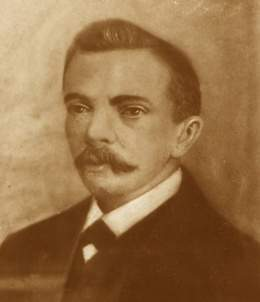
- Born: Honorato Andrés del Castillo y Cancio; November 30, 1838; Sancti Spíritus, Las Villas, Captaincy General of Cuba, Spanish Empire
- Died: July 20, 1869 (aged 30); Los Naranjos, Ciego de Ávila Province, Captaincy General of Cuba, Spanish Empire
- Military career
- Allegiance: Cuba
- Branch: Cuban Liberation Army
- Service years: 1868–1869
- Rank: Major General
- Conflicts: Ten Years' War †

Honorato del Castillo (November 30, 1838 – July 20, 1869) was a Cuban revolutionary and army general who played a key role in the Ten Years' War in Cuba.

== Early life ==
Honorato Andrés del Castillo y Cancio was born in Sancti Spíritus, Las Villas, Spanish Cuba, on November 30, 1838.

Castillo studied and subsequently taught at the "El Salvador" school led by José de la Luz y Caballero. He was multilingual and graduated as a Doctor of Medicine before the war.

== Ten Years' War ==
Honorato del Castillo joined the war of independence against Spain following the Cry of Yara by Carlos Manuel de Céspedes on October 10, 1868.

On April 10, 1869, he served as a delegate of Sancti Spíritus at the Guáimaro constituent assembly. He was among the citizen deputies who voted for the Guáimaro Constitution.

From the beginning, he was instrumental in the uprising in Cinco Villos and Sancti Spíritus. The Mambí brigadier commanded the first brigade of the Cuban Liberation Army's 3rd Division, Army of Las Villas, under Maj. Gen. Federico Fernández Cavada. It was one of the division's three brigades and operated in Sancti Spíritus. By summer 1869, he had set fire to several Spanish-owned plantations.

== Death ==
Honorato del Castillo died on July 20, 1869, in Los Naranjos, near Morón, in the province of Ciego de Ávila, Cuba. He fell victim to an ambush and was killed by Spanish forces under the command of Colonel Ramón del Portal.
