= Civil Aviation Institute of Cuba =

Instituto de Aeronáutica Civil de Cuba
- Abbreviation: IACC
- Formation: June 12, 1985; 41 years ago
- Purpose: Civil aviation authority of Cuba
- Headquarters: Havana, Cuba
- President: Ramón Martínez
- Website: www.iacc.gov.cu

The Civil Aviation Institute of Cuba (IACC, Spanish: Instituto de Aeronáutica Civil de Cuba) is the civil aviation authority of Cuba, headquartered in Vedado, Plaza de la Revolución, Havana.

The IACC was created as a result of Decree Law 85 of June 12, 1985. As of 2010, Ramón Martínez Echevarría is the president of the IACC.

== See also ==
- Aero Caribbean Flight 883
- Cubana de Aviación Flight 972
