= Guasimal =

- Village
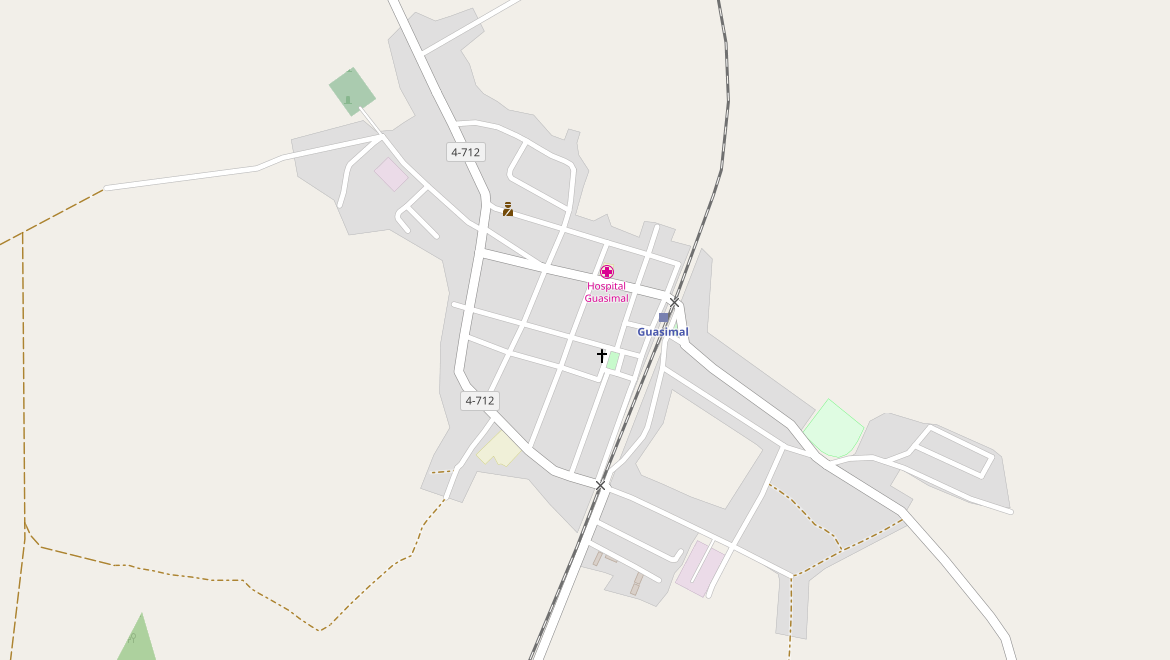
- OSM map showing Guasimal

- Location of Guasimal in Cuba
- Coordinates: 21°44′24.6″N 79°27′49.3″W
- Country: Cuba
- Province: Sancti Spíritus
- Municipality: Sancti Spíritus
- Founded: 1865
- Elevation: 60 m (200 ft)

Population (2011)
  - Total: 5,000
- Time zone: UTC-5 (EST)
- Area code: +53-41

Guasimal is a Cuban village and consejo popular ("people's council", i.e. hamlet) of the municipality of Sancti Spíritus, in Sancti Spíritus Province. In 2011 it had a population of about 5,000.

== History ==
The village was founded in 1865. In late 1950s, during the Cuban Revolution, Che Guevara established his first guerrilla camp near the town. In November 2010, Aero Caribbean Flight 883 crashed near the village.

== Geography ==
Located on a plain between Zaza Reservoir and the Caribbean Coast, Guasimal is a rural village surrounded by some scattered hillocks and a forest area. It is 11 km from Paredes, 17 from Entronque Guasimal, 20 from Tunas de Zaza, 23 from Banao, 27 from Sancti Spíritus, 36 from La Sierpe and 74 from Trinidad. Nearest rivers are Mayabuna (west) and Zaza (east).

== Transport ==
The village is served by a railway station on the Sancti Spíritus-Tunas de Zaza line. Entronque Guasimal, 17 km north of it, is crossed in the middle by the state highway "Circuito Sur" (CS).

== See also ==
- Zaza Dam
- Municipalities of Cuba
- List of cities in Cuba
