= Dominican Red Cross =

Dominican Red Cross (Spanish: Cruz Roja Dominicana; CRD) was founded in 1927. Activities performed include the distribution of aid following disasters; education on vector borne disease avoidance (inc. Zika Virus and Dengue Virus); first aid training; and sanitation improvement. Community engagement is strongly pushed, and routine work consists of door to door visits and community meetings, to raise awareness of issues and coping strategies.
