= Saliña, Curaçao =

Saliña
- Neighbourhood
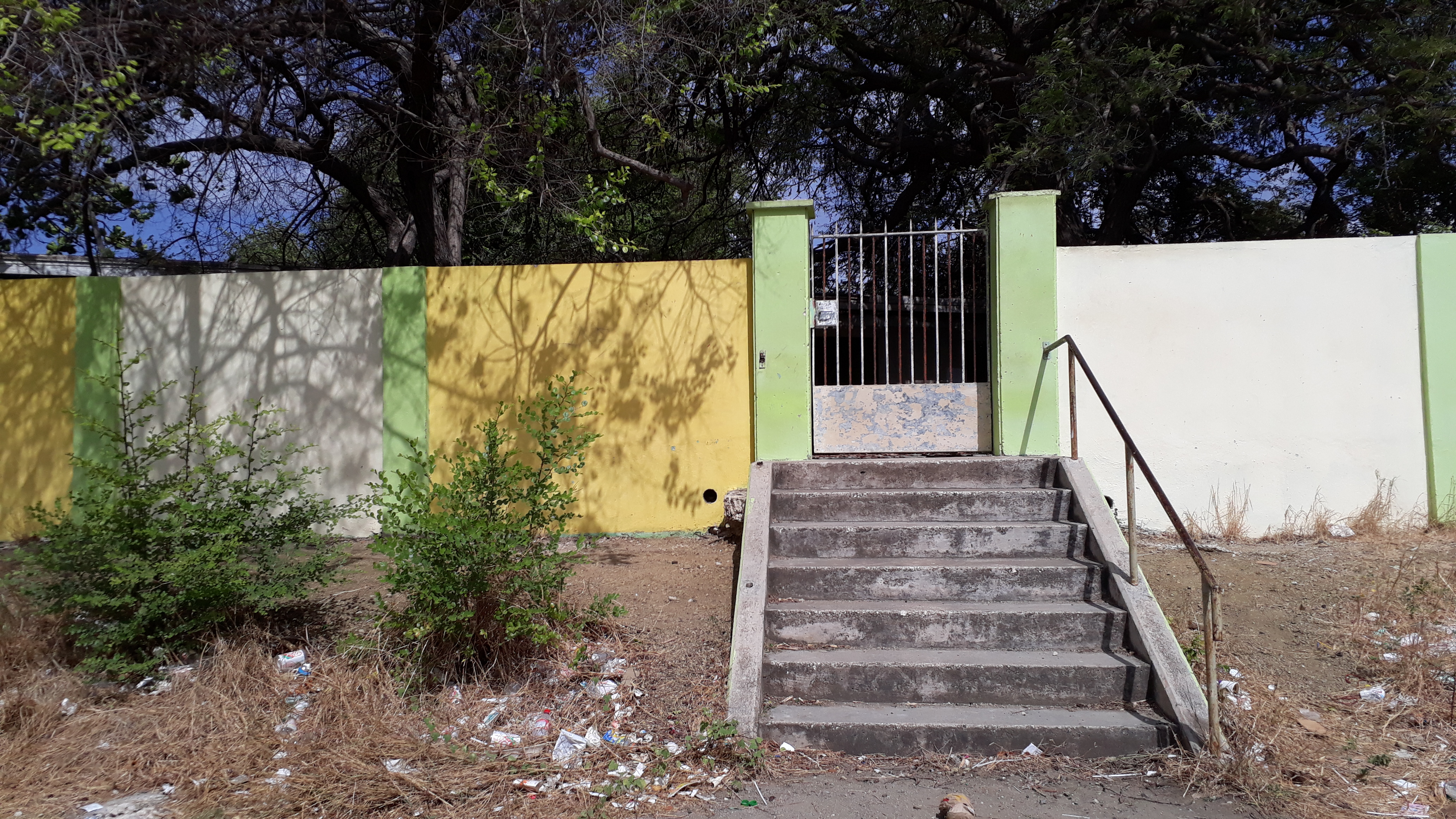
- Stairs in Saliña

- Location in Curaçao
- Coordinates: 12°6′19″N 68°54′12″W
- State: Kingdom of the Netherlands
- Country: Curaçao
- City: Willemstad

Population (2011)
  - Total: 2,538

Saliña is a residential area in southeast Curaçao located in the eastern part of the capital, Willemstad. The word Saliña in Papiamentu means salt lake. Most of the lake has been poldered for housing developments. The neighborhood started as the plantation Saliña Abou in 1726.

Saliña is one of the primary shopping and office districts on the island with many retail stores, restaurants, cafes, banks and a mall. Its main road heads towards the east into the Caracasbaaiweg, which runs to the Caracas Bay and the Jan Thiel Beach with several major resorts.

== Bibliography ==
- Buurtprofiel Saliña (2011). "Buurtprofiel Saliña" (PDF). Government of Curaçao (in Dutch).
