= Zaza Reservoir =

Man-made reservoir in Cuba

- Location of Zaza Reservoir in Cuba
- Location: Sancti-Spíritus Province
- Coordinates: 21°50′N 79°22′W
- Type: Reservoir
- Primary inflows: Zaza River, Yayabo River, Taguasco River, Tuinucú River
- Primary outflows: Zaza River
- Basin countries: Cuba
- First flooded: 1975
- Surface area: 113.5 km^{2} (43.8 sq mi)
- Water volume: 750×10^{6} m^{3} (26×10^{9} cu ft)
- Surface elevation: 25 m (82 ft)
- Settlements: Sancti Spíritus

Zaza Reservoir (Spanish: Embalse Zaza, La Presa Zaza) is the largest man-made reservoir in Cuba. It is located in the Sancti Spíritus Province in central Cuba, 10 kilometres (6.2 mi) south-east of the city of Sancti-Spíritus and 11 kilometres (6.8 mi) north-west of La Sierpe. It has a water mirror area of 113.5 km^{2} (43.8 sq mi). and an average volume of 750,000,000 m³.

== Overview ==
It was developed on the course of the Zaza River, which flows from Sierra del Escambray to the Tunas Channel in the Caribbean Sea and is Cuba's second longest river (after Rio Cauto). Other rivers that empty into the reservoir include the Yayabo, Taguasco and Tuinucú Rivers.

The Zaza Dam was built over a 3-year period and was completed on December 7, 1971, at a cost of 27 million Cuban pesos. A hydroelectric plant was subsequently added in 1978.

The water of the reservoir is used to irrigate the farmlands to the south all the way to the Caribbean coast. Fishing (both leisure and commercial) is also an important activity on the reservoir. One of the largest fresh water fish in the world, Arapaima gigas, was introduced to the waters in 1980. There are also other important fish, such as tilapia, trout, and catfish.

== Drought ==
In 2024, the region was experiencing drought. The volume of water in the reservoir was reduced to 13%.
