= Vedado =

Urban neighborhood in the city of Havana, Cuba

Coordinates: 23°07′52″N 82°23′39″W

Vedado Distrito del Vedado
- District in Havana
- Vedado District
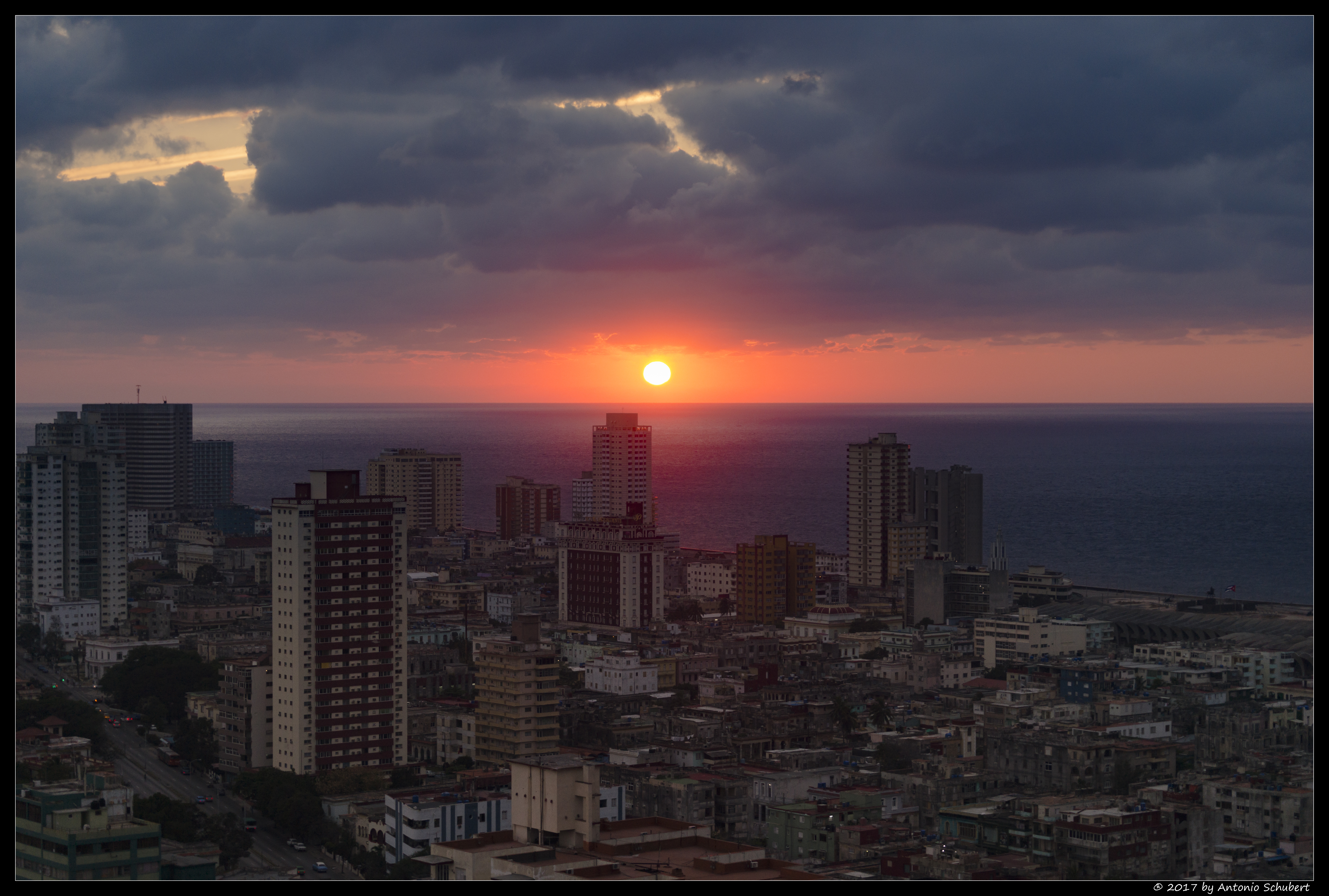
- Interactive map of Vedado
- Country: Cuba
- Province: Havana
- Municipality: Plaza de la Revolución
- Founded: 1858

Government
  - Type: Mayor-council government
- Elevation: 45 m (148 ft)

Population (2023)
  - Total: 108,369
- Time zone: EST
- Area code: (+53) 7

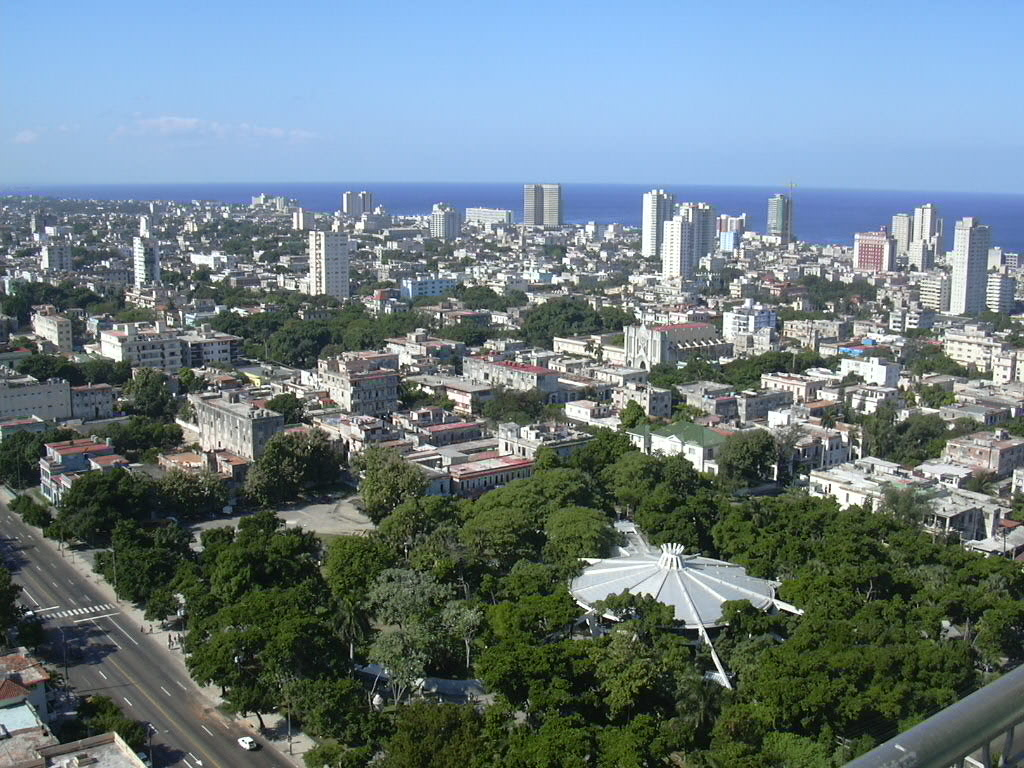
Vedado from the Hotel Habana Libre

Vedado (Spanish: El Vedado, Spanish pronunciation: [el βeˈðaðo]) is a central business district and urban neighborhood in the city of Havana, Cuba. Bordered on the east by Calzada de Infanta and Central Havana, and on the west by the Alemendares River and Miramar / Playa district, Vedado is a more modern part of the city than the areas to the east, developed in the first half of the 20th century, during the Republic period. In 2016 it was described by one commentator as the city's "most affluent" section. The main street running east to west is Calle 23, also known as "La Rampa". The northern edge of the district is the waterfront seawall known as the Malecón, a famous and popular place for social gatherings in the city. The area popularly referred to as 'Vedado' consists of the wards (consejos populares) of Vedado, Rampa, Vedado-Malecón and Carmelo, all in the municipality of Plaza de la Revolución.

== History ==
El Vedado was since the 16th century a part of the country where building was prohibited for military reasons. This changed in 1859 with the division of a piece of land in what would later be called el Carmelo. The land was divided with a tartan grid of 100 meter for the blocks and 16 meter for the streets. The main streets were 25 meters wide to make them suitable for a tram.

Soon followed other urban areas: el Vedado in 1860 and Medina in 1883. And at the start of the First Republic the once forbidden land was parcelled in full. Línea street was intended to build the tram track. The Avenidas Paseo, Presidentes (calle G) and 23 where among the other important streets.

The first buildings in this area were mainly bourgeois villas. In the thirties there was a first period of prosperity in which, among others, the López Serrano building and the hotel Nacional were built.

During the construction boom of the 1950s, dozens of tall apartment buildings were constructed. A famous building from that period is the Havana Hilton hotel, at that time the tallest hotel in Latin America.

== Notable sites ==
Among the notable sites in Vedado are the hotels: Hotel Nacional de Cuba (National Hotel), the Havana Libre (former Hilton), Melia Cohiba Hotel and Hotel Riviera.

In addition:

- Colon Cemetery
- FOCSA Building, tallest building in Cuba at 121 m
- Edificio del Seguro Médico, Havana
- López Serrano Building, first skyscraper in Cuba
- Radiocentro CMQ Building
- Coppelia (ice cream parlor)
- Embassy of the United States, Havana
- José Martí Anti-Imperialist Plaza
- Jewish religious centers include the Gran Sinagoga Bet Shalom and the Centro Hebreo Sefaradi
- John Lennon Park, named for the statue of Lennon located there
- Monument to the Victims of the USS Maine
- University of Havana
- National broadcast center for Cuban television.
- Cementerio Chino (The Chinese Cemetery)

Nearby neighborhoods include:

- To the east: Central Havana
- To the west: Miramar
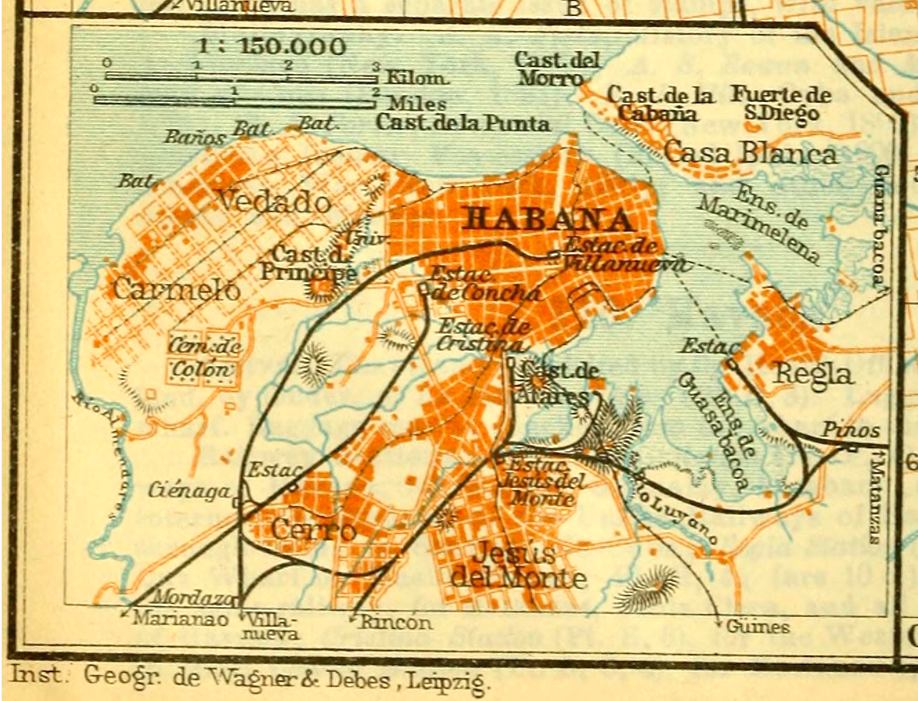

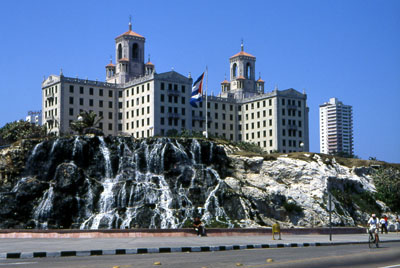
Hotel Nacional de Cuba

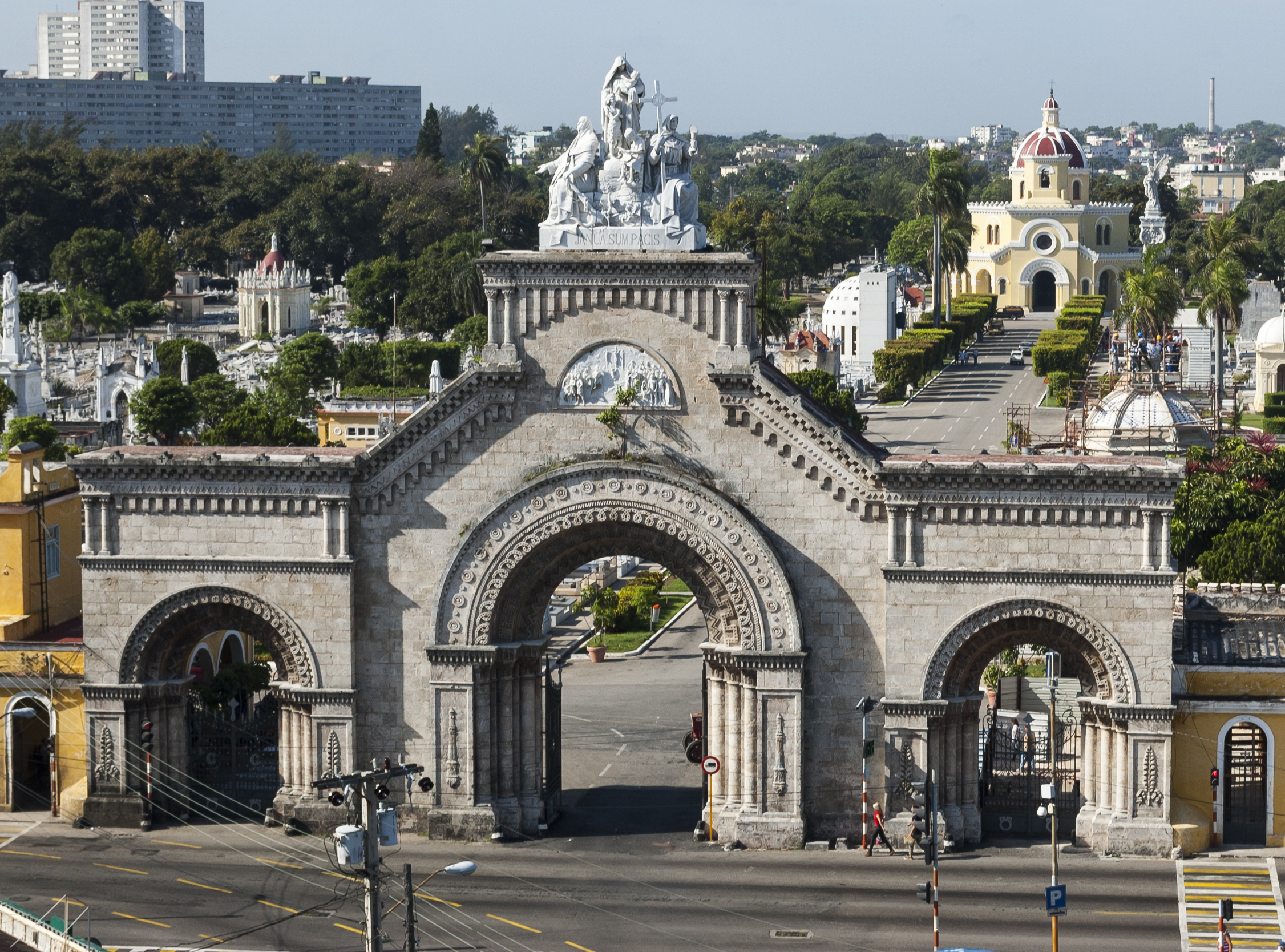
Colon Cemetery, Havana

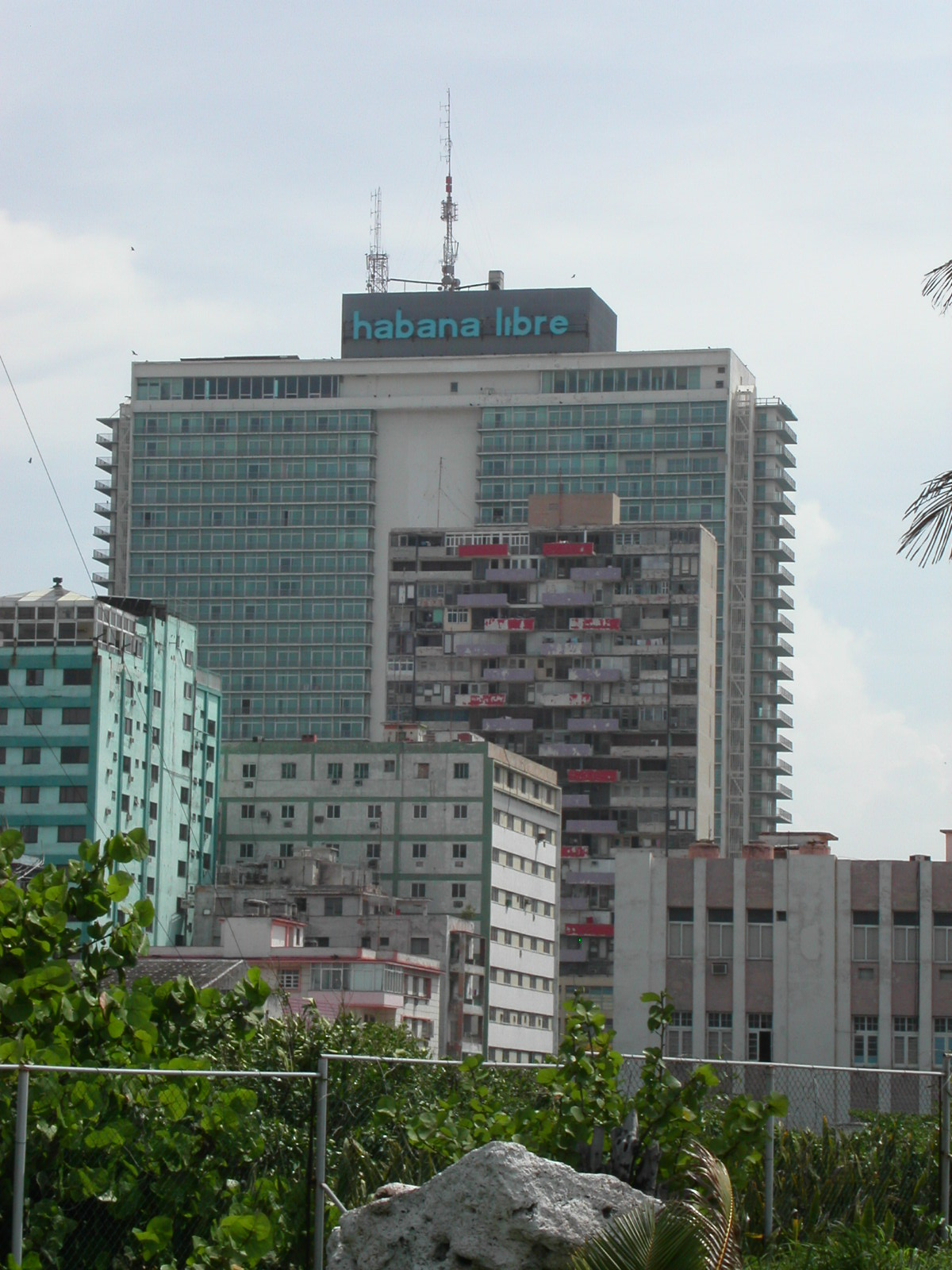
Habana Libre Hotel

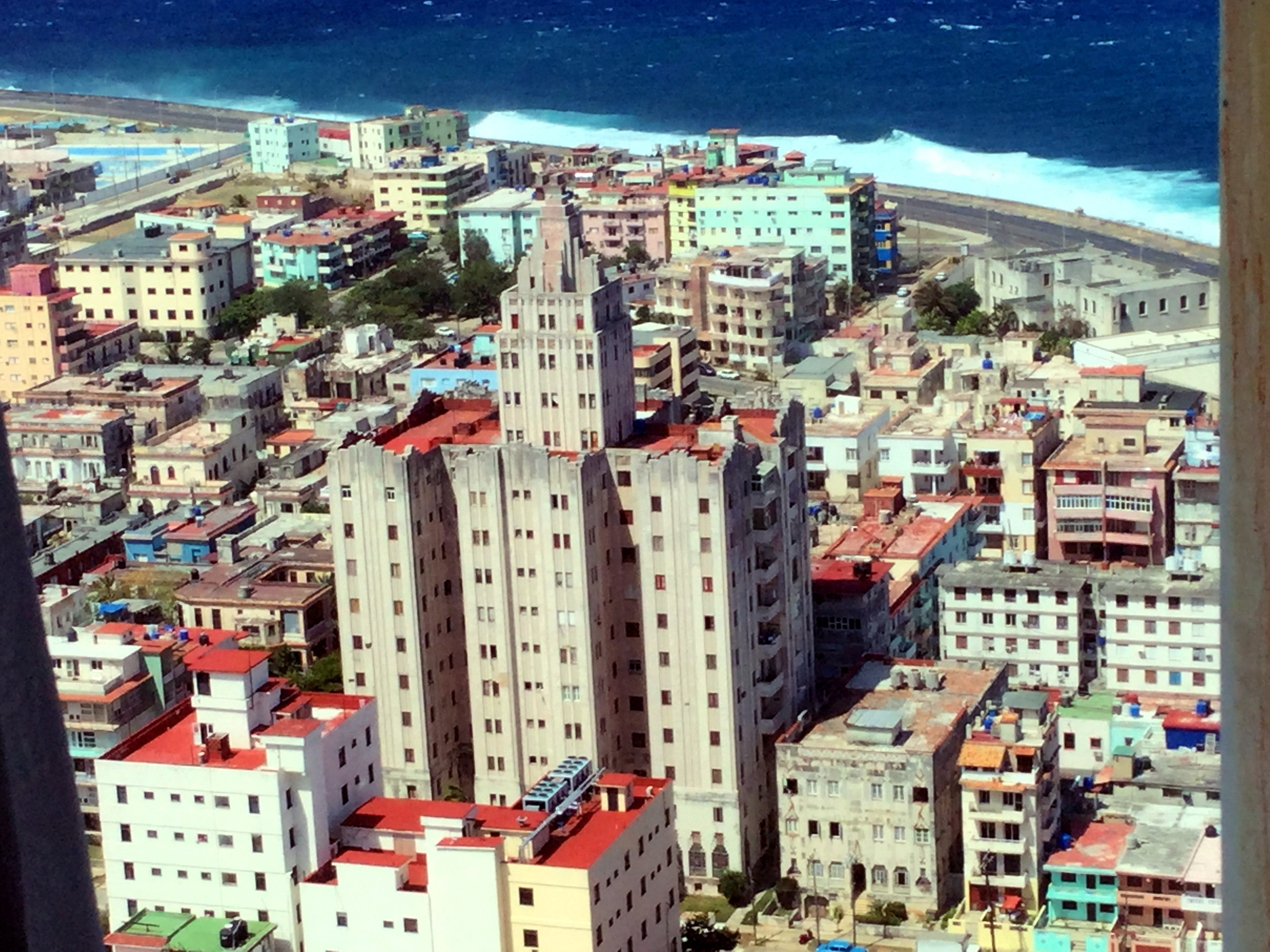
López Serrano Building

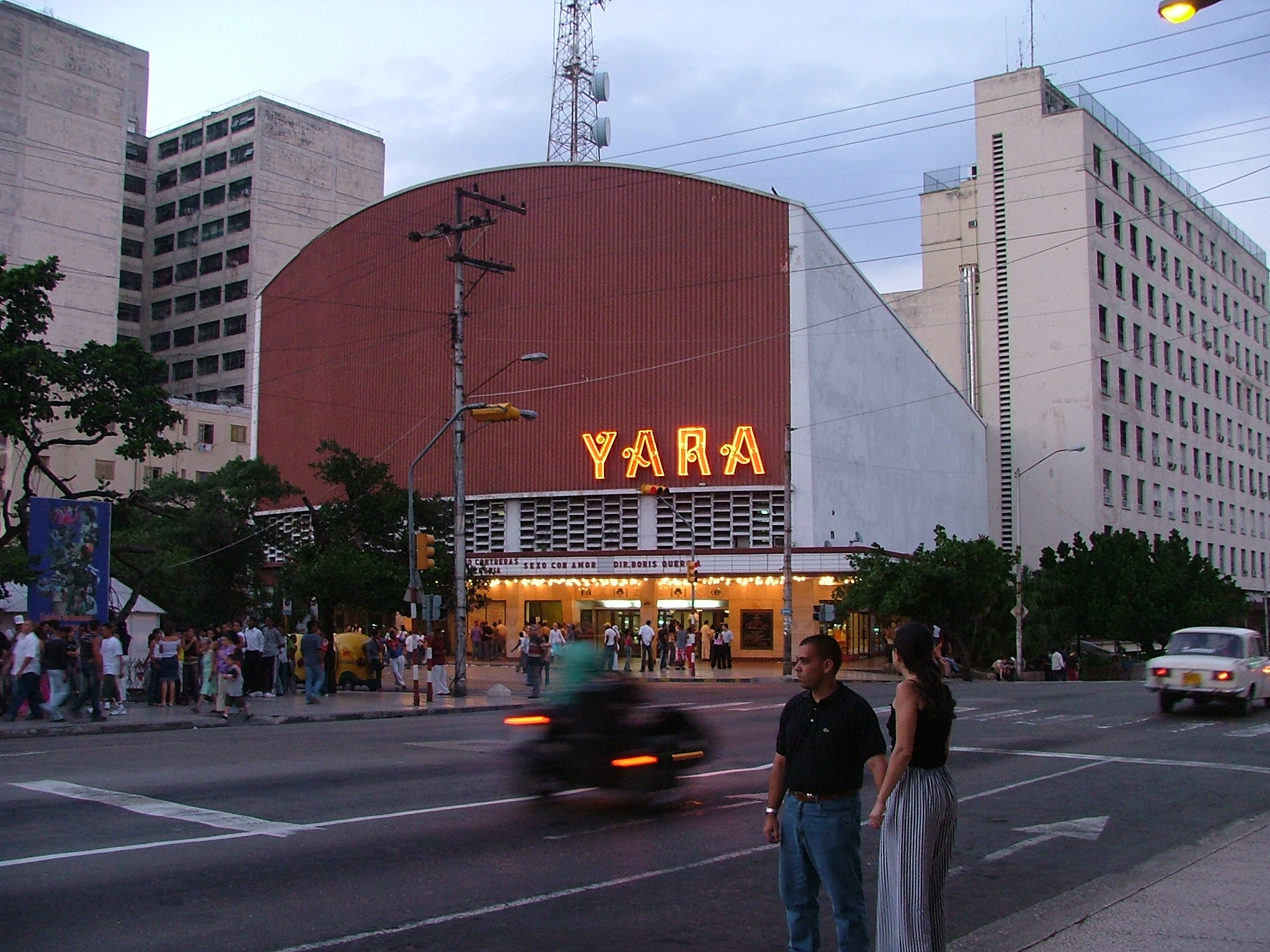
Radiocentro CMQ Building

== Economy ==
Aero Caribbean has its headquarters in Vedado.

The Venezuelan airline Conviasa has an office in the IACC Building in Vedado.

== Government and infrastructure ==
Instituto de Aeronáutica Civil de Cuba, Cuba's civil aviation authority, has its headquarters in Vedado.

== Culture ==
=== Gay scene ===
23rd Street in Vedado is also the centerpoint of the city's gay scene in a country which now grants many rights to LGBT citizens. At night, 23rd St. is reminiscent of a gay district between the Cinema Yara and Coppelia ice cream parlor, and the foot of 23rd at the Malecón, with numerous gay entertainment options nearby such as the Bim Bom outdoor bar and the Las Vegas nightclub. Many of the casas particulares target LGBT clients as customers.

== Bibliography ==
- Carles Crosas Armengol (2008). "Reticulas verdes, nuevas ciudades decimonönicas. El paradigma del Vedado, 'En sanche Jardin' de La Habana" [Green grids, new nineteenth-century cities; the paradigm of Vedado, garden of Havana] (PDF). Revista Iberoamericana de Urbanismo (in Spanish). Polytechnic University of Catalonia. ISSN 2013-6242.
- Günter Mertins [in German]; Orestes Sardiñas Gómez (2014). "El Vedado / Havana (Cuba): Consequences of the Transformation Process Within a Former Upper-Class Residential Quarter". Erdkunde. 68 (3): 209–217. doi:10.3112/erdkunde.2014.03.05. ISSN 0014-0015. JSTOR 24365233.
