= Zaza Dam =

Dam in Cuba

- Location within Cuba
- Official name: Presa Zaza
- Country: Cuba
- Location: Sancti Spíritus, Sancti Spíritus Province
- Coordinates: 21°48′13.23″N 79°21′20.34″W
- Purpose: Water supply, power
- Status: Operational
- Opening date: 1972; 54 years ago

Dam and spillways
- Type of dam: Embankment
- Height: 38 m (125 ft)

Reservoir
- Creates: Zaza Reservoir
- Total capacity: 1,020,000,000 m^{3} (830,000 acre⋅ft)
- Surface area: 41.3 km^{2} (15.9 mi^{2})

Power Station
- Operator: Unidad Empresarial de Base Hidroenergía
- Commission date: 2008-2009
- Turbines: 2 x 1.35 MW Kaplan-type
- Installed capacity: 2.7 MW

The Zaza Dam is an embankment dam on the Zaza River about 15 km (9.3 mi) southwest of Sancti Spíritus in Sancti Spíritus Province, Cuba. The dam was completed in 1972 with the primary purpose of irrigation but it also supports a small hydroelectric power station. The dam's reservoir, Zaza Reservoir, has a storage capacity of 1,020,000,000 m^{3} (830,000 acre⋅ft), making it the largest in the country. Beginning in the 1990s, the Chinese government helped plan and install the hydroelectric power station. It contains two 1.35 MW Kaplan turbine-generators. The first was commissioned in October 2008, the second in February 2009.
