= Sancti Spíritus =

Ciudad de Sancti Spiritus
- Municipality
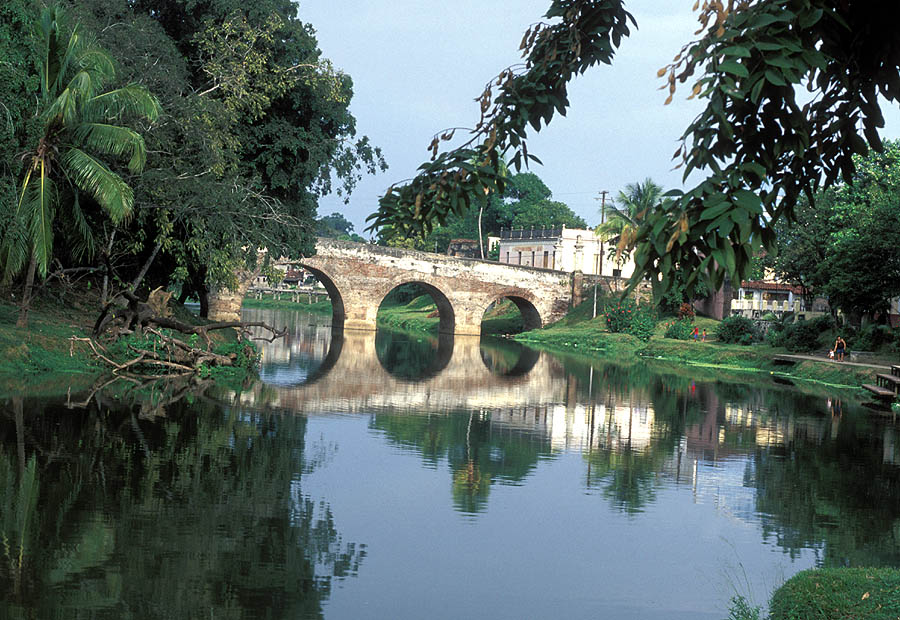
- Yayabo Bridge over the Yayabo River

- Coat of arms

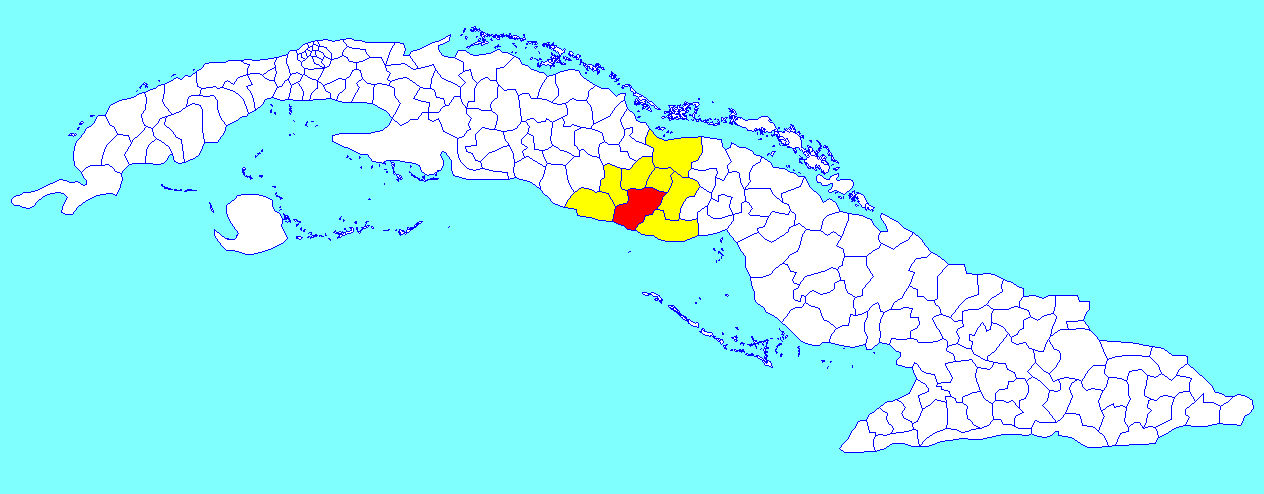
- Sancti Spíritus municipality (red) within Sancti Spíritus Province (yellow) and Cuba
- Coordinates: 21°56′2″N 79°26′38″W
- Country: Cuba
- Province: Province of Sancti Spíritus
- Founded: 1514

Government
  - President: Alexis Lorente Jiménez
  - Vice-President: Bárbara de los Milagros Mínguez Amézaga

Area
  - Total: 1,150.7 km^{2} (444.3 sq mi)
- Elevation: 51 m (167 ft)

Population (2022)
  - Total: 142,618
  - Density: 123.94/km^{2} (321.00/sq mi)
- Demonym: Espirituano/a
- Time zone: UTC-5 (EST)
- Postal code: 60100
- Area code: +53 41

Sancti Spíritus (Spanish pronunciation: [ˈsaŋktjesˈpiɾitus]) is a municipality and capital city of the province of Sancti Spíritus in central Cuba and one of the oldest Cuban European settlements. Sancti Spíritus is the genitive case of Latin Sanctus Spiritus ("Holy Spirit").

== History ==
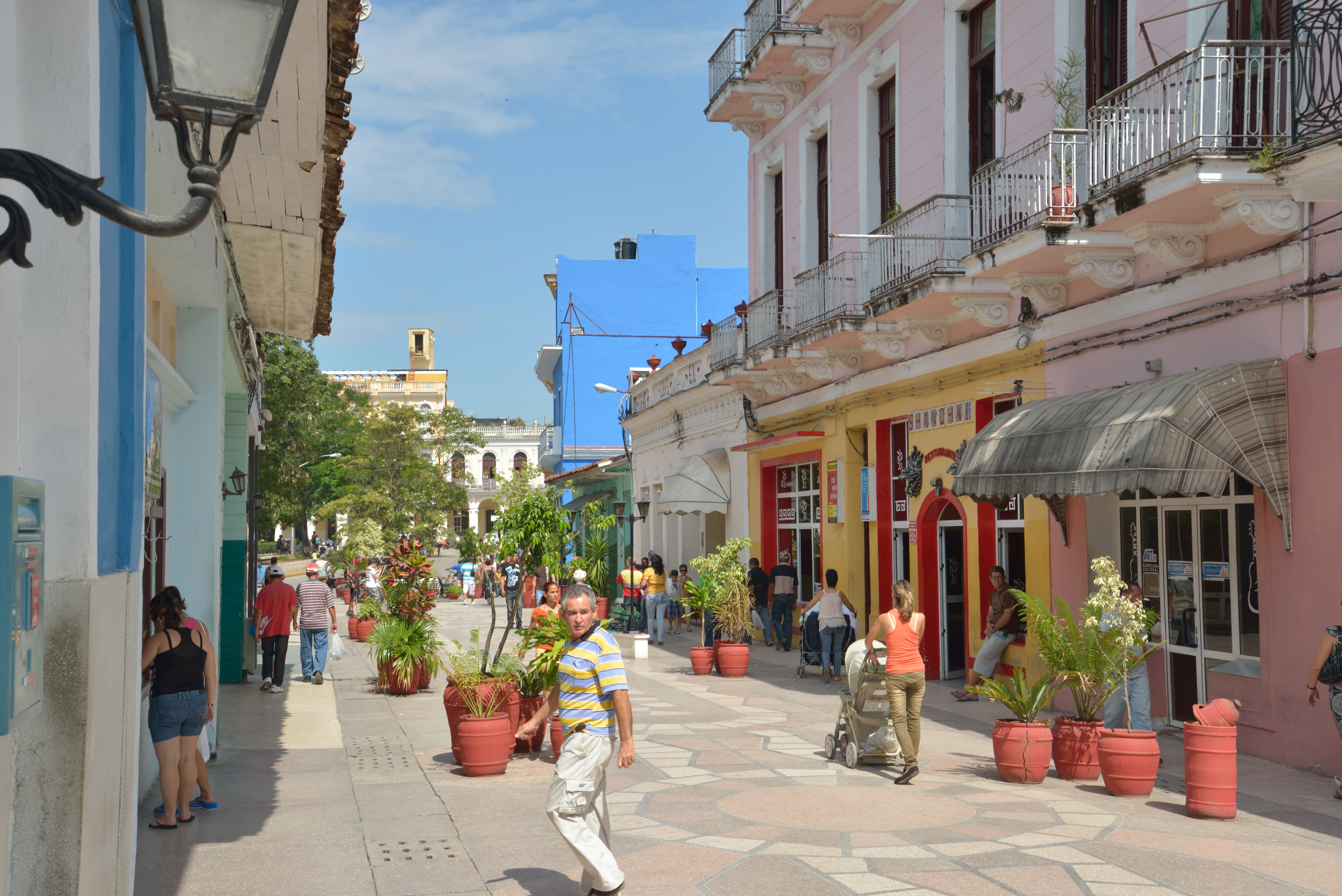
A pedestrian boulevard in Sancti Spiritus

The city was founded by Diego Velázquez de Cuéllar in 1514.

The city contributed men for Hernán Cortés' 1518 expedition to Mexico, including Alonso Hernandez Puertocarrero, Gonzalo de Sandoval, and Juan Velazquez de Leon.

Francisco Iznaga, a Basque landowner in the western portion of Cuba during the first thirty years of the colonization of Cuba, was elected mayor of Bayamo in 1540. Iznaga was the originator of a powerful lineage which finally settled in Sancti Spíritus and Trinidad, where Torre Iznaga (Iznaga Tower) is. His descendants fought for the independence of Cuba and for annexation to the U.S., from 1820 to 1900.

== Geography ==
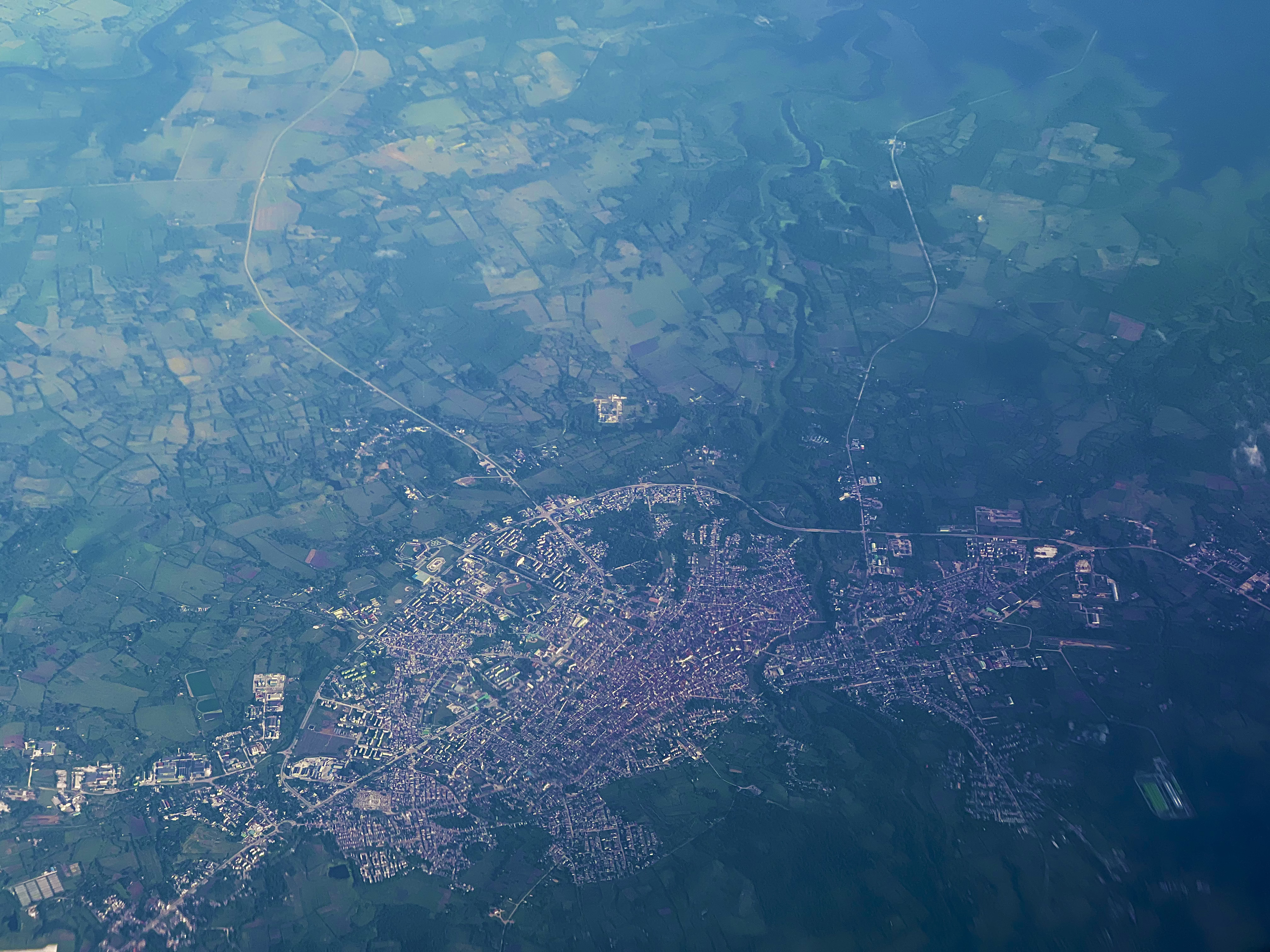
Aerial photograph of Sancti Spíritus

The municipality is divided into the barrios of Banao, Bellamota, Bijabo, Guasimal, Hospital, Jíbaro, Manacas, Mapos, Paredes, Paula, Pelayo, Pueblo Nuevo, San Andrés, Tuinicú, Tunas de Zaza and Zaza del Medio.

The Zaza Reservoir is located southwest of the city.

The city has a central park which is a place of entertainment for people of all ages.

The geographic center of Cuba is located off the shores of the municipality.

=== Climate ===
According to the Köppen Climate Classification system, Sancti Spíritus has a tropical savanna climate, abbreviated "Aw" on climate maps.

Climate data for Sancti Spíritus
Month	Jan	Feb	Mar	Apr	May	Jun	Jul	Aug	Sep	Oct	Nov	Dec	Year
Mean daily maximum °C (°F)	27 (80)	27 (80)	28 (83)	29 (84)	30 (86)	30 (86)	31 (87)	31 (88)	30 (86)	29 (85)	28 (82)	27 (80)	29 (84)
Mean daily minimum °C (°F)	18 (64)	18 (64)	19 (67)	20 (68)	22 (72)	23 (74)	23 (74)	23 (74)	23 (73)	22 (72)	21 (69)	14 (57)	21 (70)
Average precipitation mm (inches)	30 (1.2)	43 (1.7)	46 (1.8)	69 (2.7)	210 (8.3)	280 (11)	200 (7.7)	200 (8)	200 (7.8)	220 (8.7)	51 (2)	23 (0.9)	1,560 (61.4)
Source: Weatherbase

== Demographics ==
In 2022, the municipality of Sancti Spíritus had a population of 142,618. With a total area of 1,151 km^{2} (444 sq mi), this means a population density of 120/km^{2} (310/sq mi).

== Main sights ==
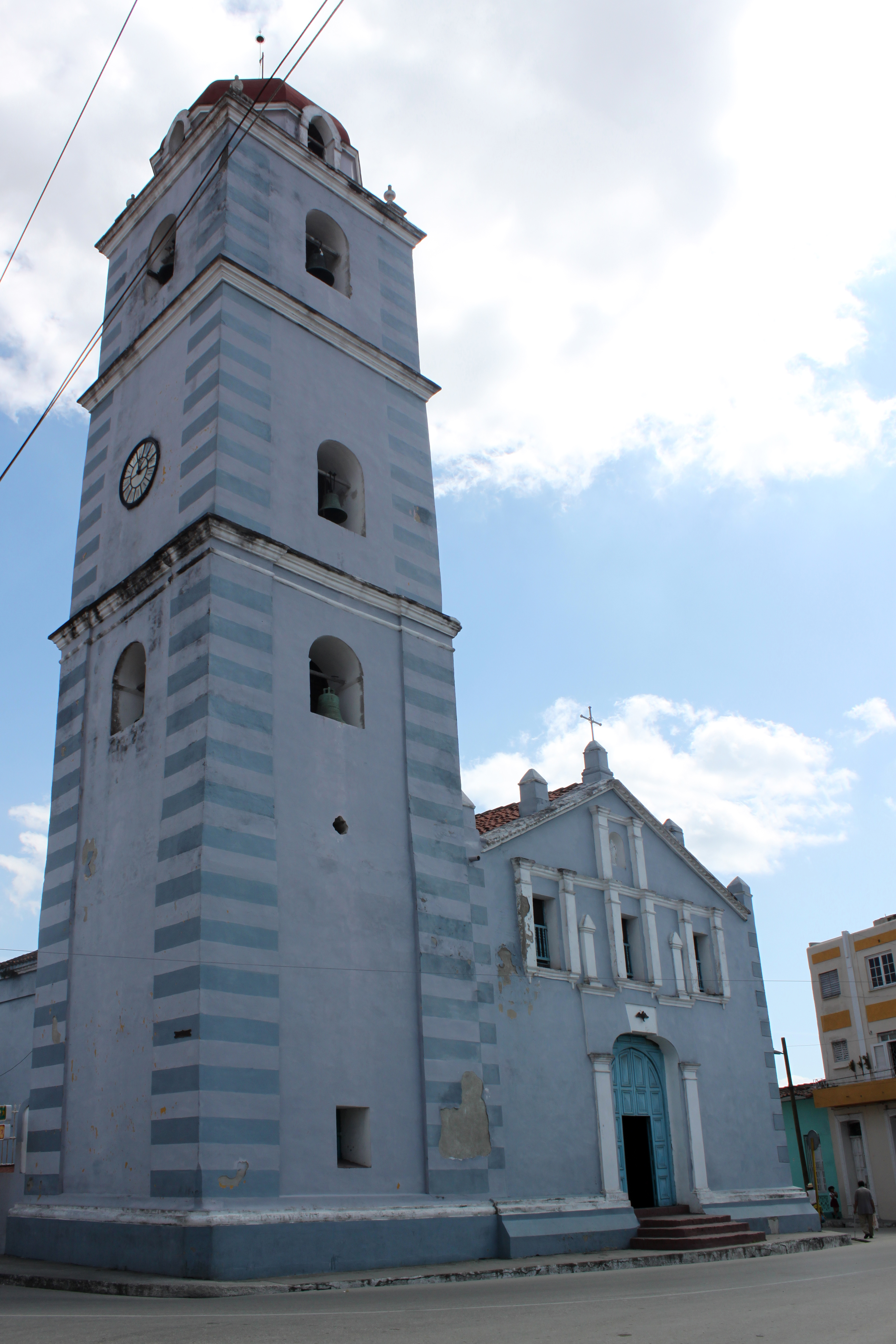
The Parroquial Mayor, Cuba's oldest church, in Sancti Spiritus center

The Iglesia Parroquial Mayor del Espíritu Santo is located two blocks south of the town's main square; it is a venerable green-towered church whose early 16th-century origins make it the country's oldest. Nearby is the Museo de Arte Colonial (Colonial Art Museum), one of Sancti Spíritus's most attractive colonial homes and a standout attraction. The opulent former palatial mansion of the Valle Iznaga clan, one of Cuba's most elite families who fled Cuba after Fidel's Revolution, it became the property of the state in 1961. Ninety percent of what you see inside, from furniture to paintings, is original. Though the family obviously kept an impressive collection of Limoges porcelain, French gilded mirrors, Italian marble tables, and Baccarat crystal chandeliers here, it wasn't their primary residence; the house was used mostly to host family members in transit, so the furnishings were rather eclectic. The three bedrooms are decorated in grand style, though, with handmade lace, embroidered sheets, and hand-painted glass. There is a gorgeous and very Cuban leather sillón fumador (smoking chair) and, in the music room, the mid-18th-century American piano, one of only two of its type in Cuba. In the tearoom is the family seal, which says: "El que más vale no vale tanto como Valle vale" ("He who has the greatest worth isn't worth as much as a Valle is worth"—playing off the Spanish word for "worth" with the family surname).

Another interesting landmark is one of Cuba's older bridges over the Yayabo river. Built in 1815 with clay bricks it forms five arcs, the center being 9 meters tall. The entire bridge is only 85 meters long and was designed for pedestrians and carriages during colonial-era Cuba but has thus far resisted heavier modern traffic.

Sancti Spíritus has a famous Medical University located at the Main road in Olivos III. It has students from all over the world representing 34 nationalities. The university is affiliated with ELAM in Havana.

== Transport ==
The city is crossed in the middle by the Carretera Central (CC), the Cuban principal highway spanning the length of the island. It is also served by the Sancti Spíritus Airport and by the A1 motorway, at the exit "Sancti Spíritus-Yaguajay", located near Guayos.

It counts a railway station on Cabaiguán-Sancti Spíritus-Tunas de Zaza line, with express trains from/to Havana, a terminal for interprovincial omnibuses and an urban bus service.

== Sport ==
The local baseball team is the Gallos de Sancti Spíritus, and its home ground is the José Antonio Huelga Stadium (Estadio José Antonio Huelga). The local football team is the FC Sancti Spíritus.

== Education ==
The Facultad de Ciencias Medicas Sancti Spiritus is a medical school located in Sancti Spíritus.

== Notable people ==
- Joaquín Casillas, former soldier, and commanding officer, in the Cuban Constitutional Army.
- Yuli Gurriel, MLB player for the Miami Marlins, formerly of the Houston Astros.
- Lourdes Gurriel Jr., MLB player for the Arizona Diamondbacks.

== Gallery ==
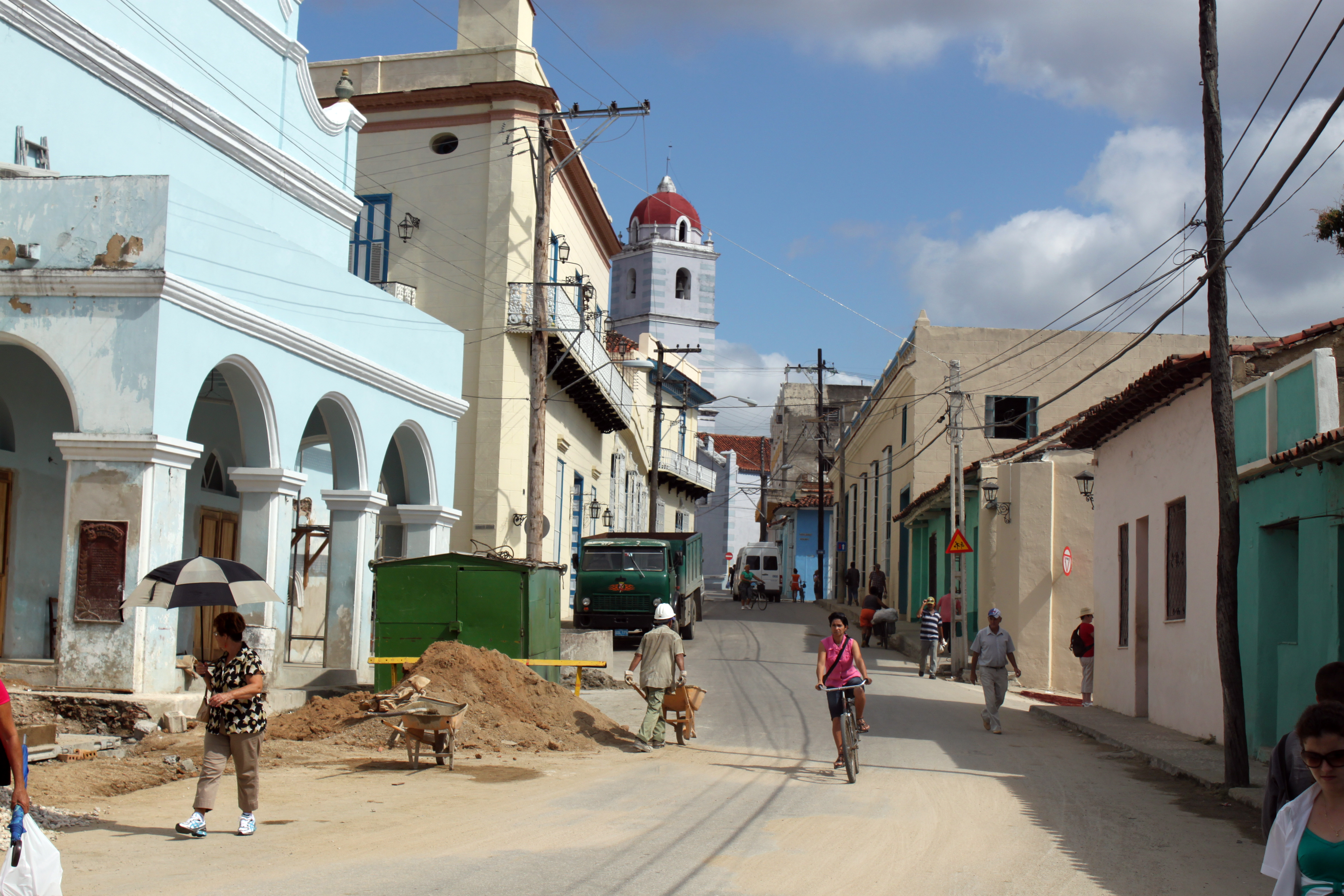
Street scene

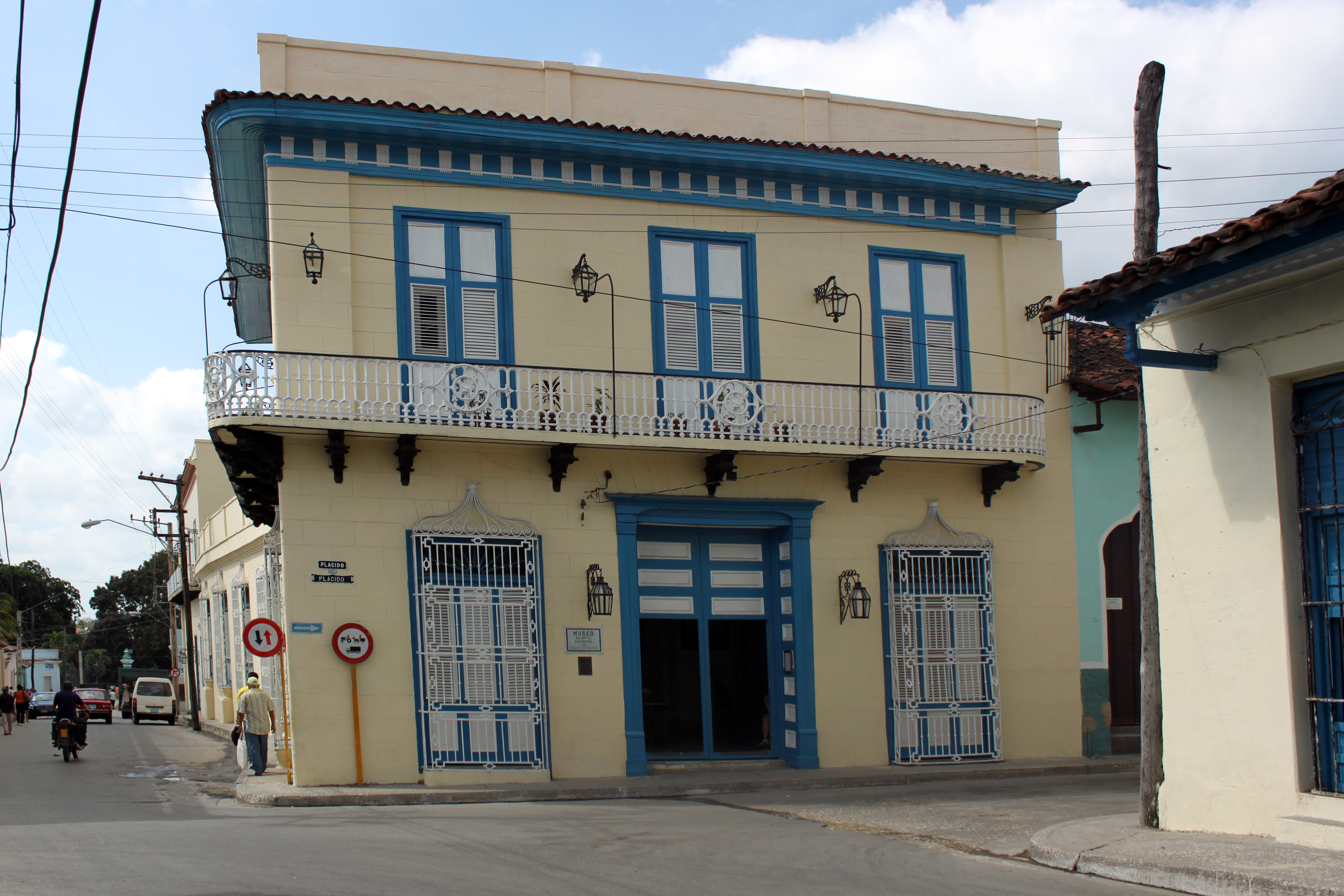
Museo de Arte Colonial

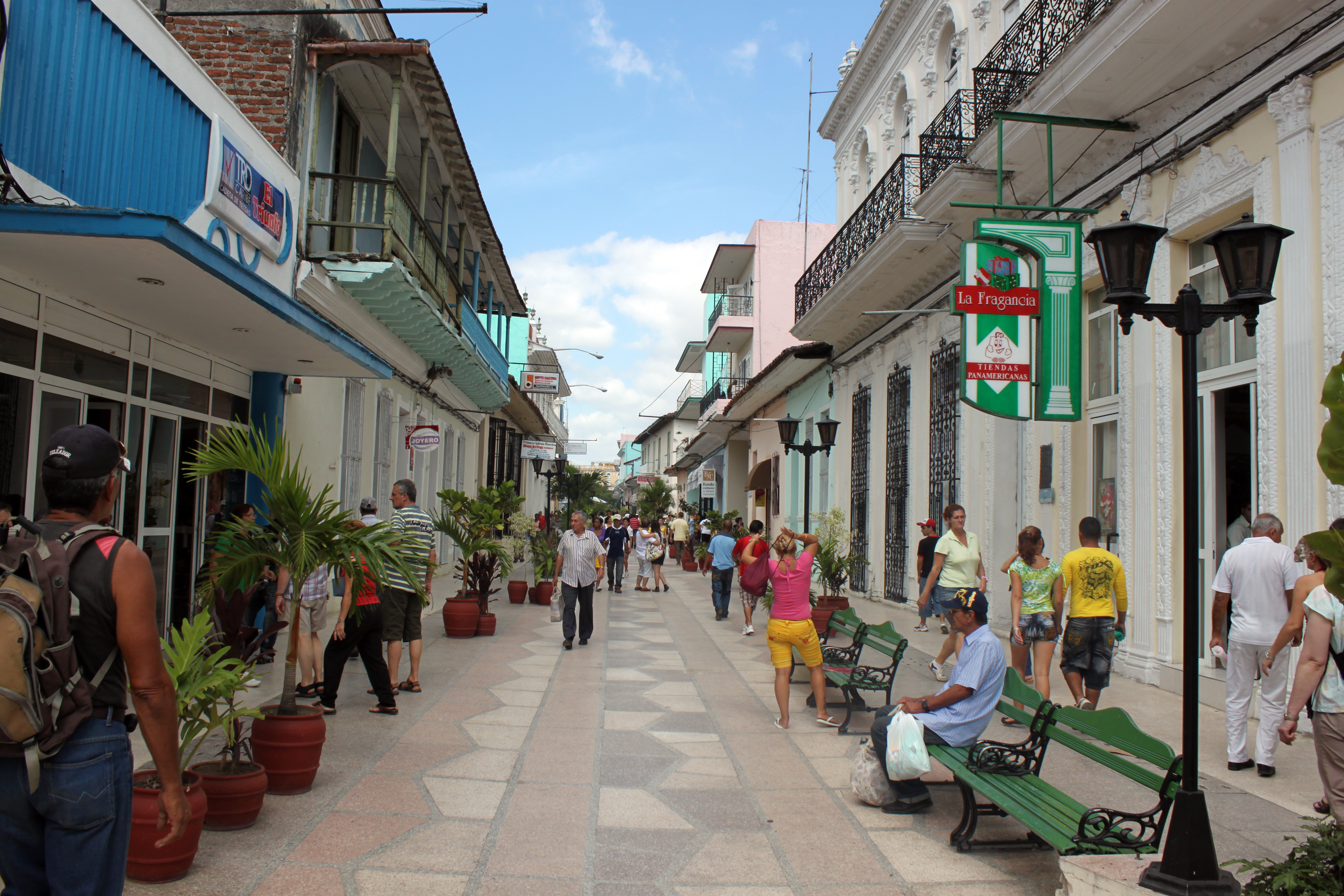
Pedestrian zone

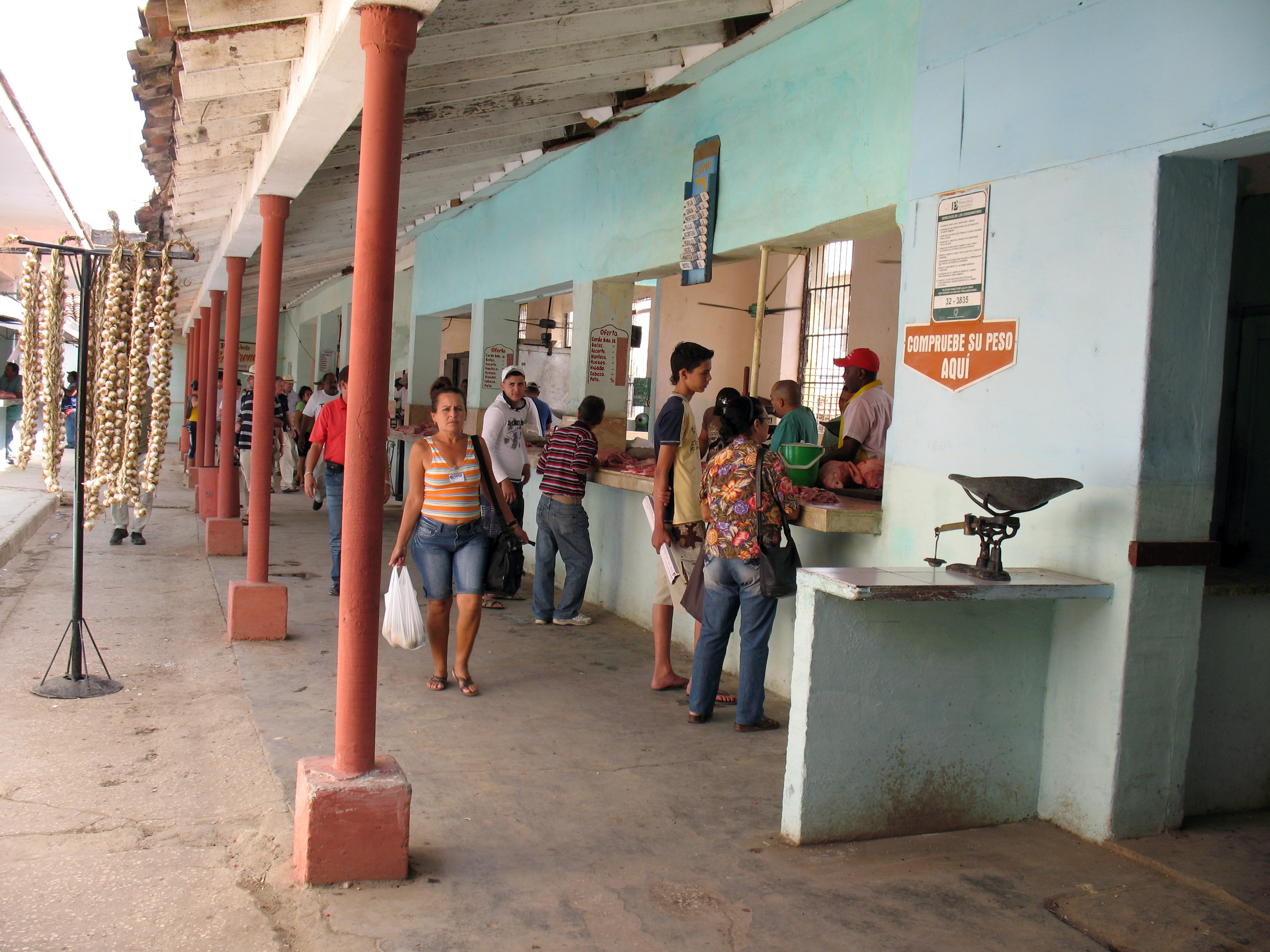
Agricultural Market

== See also ==
- Zaza Dam
- Municipalities of Cuba
- List of cities in Cuba
