= December 25 =

December 25 this year in various calendars
- Friday, 25 December 2026
Akan	Fofie
Armenian	8 Arach 1476
Aztec	Huei Tozoztli 4, 12 Ōlīn
Babylonian	15 Kislimu, 2337 SE
Balinese pawukon	Luang, Pepet, Pasah, Jaya, Umanis, Tungleh, Sukra of Warigadian, Kala, Urungan, Pati
Bengali	10 Poush, BS 1433
Chinese	Yin Water Rooster・Bond Mansion; Fire Horse Year, Month 11, Day 17 (Dongzhi, 11 days until Xiaohan)
Common Era	25 December 2026 CE
Coptic	16 Koiak, AM 1743
Egyptian	13 Pachon, 2775 NE
Ethiopian	16 Tākḫśāś, 2019 Amätä Məhrät
French Republican	Décade I, Quartidi de Nivôse de l'Année 235 de la République
Gregorian	25 December, AD 2026
Hebrew	15 Tevet, AM 5787
Hindu	Punarvasu・Brahman; Solar: 10 Pauṣa, 1948 SE; Lunisolar: Dvitīyā, Kṛishna pakṣa of Mārgaśīrṣa, 2083 VE; Rāudra・5127 KY・1,872,934
Icelandic	Föstudagur, 3 Mörsugur 2026
Islamic	15 Rajab, AH 1448 (using tabular method)
ISO week date	2026-W52-5
Japanese	17 Shimotsuki, Reiwa 8 (Tōji, 11 days until Shōkan)
Julian	12 December, AD 2026 (AM 7535)
Julian day	2461400
Korean	17 Jwidal, 4359 DE
Maya	13.0.14.3.17; 10 Kankin, 12 Caban
Roman	Pridie Idus Decembres, MMDCCLXXIX AUC
Solar Hijri	4 Dey, SH 1405
Tibetan	17 mgo, me pho rta 2153 or 1772 or 1000

<<	December					>>
Su	Mo	Tu	We	Th	Fr	Sa
		1	2	3	4	5
6	7	8	9	10	11	12
13	14	15	16	17	18	19
20	21	22	23	24	25	26
27	28	29	30	31
2026

December 25 in recent years
2025 (Thursday)
2024 (Wednesday)
2023 (Monday)
2022 (Sunday)
2021 (Saturday)
2020 (Friday)
2019 (Wednesday)
2018 (Tuesday)
2017 (Monday)
2016 (Sunday)

December 25 is the 359th day of the year (360th in leap years) in the Gregorian calendar; six days remain until the end of the year.

== Events ==
=== Pre-1600 ===
- 36 – Forces of Emperor Guangwu of the Eastern Han, under the command of Wu Han, conquer the separatist Chengjia empire, reuniting China.
- 274 – A temple to Sol Invictus is dedicated in Rome by Emperor Aurelian.
- 333 – Roman Emperor Constantine the Great elevates his youngest son Constans to the rank of Caesar.
- 336 – First documented sign of Christmas celebration in Rome.
- 350 – Vetranio meets Constantius II at Naissus (Serbia) and is forced to abdicate his imperial title. Constantius allows him to live as a private citizen on a state pension.
- 508 – Clovis I, king of the Franks, is baptized into the Catholic faith at Reims, by Saint Remigius.
- 597 – Augustine of Canterbury and his fellow-labourers baptise in Kent more than 10,000 Anglo-Saxons.
- 800 – The coronation of Charlemagne as Holy Roman Emperor, in Rome.
- 820 – Eastern Emperor Leo V is murdered in a church of the Great Palace of Constantinople by followers of Michael II.
- 1000 – The foundation of the Kingdom of Hungary: Hungary is established as a Christian kingdom by Stephen I of Hungary.
- 1013 – Sweyn Forkbeard takes control of the Danelaw and is proclaimed king of England.
- 1025 – Coronation of Mieszko II Lambert as king of Poland.
- 1046 – Henry III is crowned Holy Roman Emperor by Pope Clement II.
- 1066 – William the Conqueror, Duke of Normandy is crowned king of England, at Westminster Abbey, London.
- 1076 – Coronation of Bolesław II the Generous as king of Poland.
- 1100 – Baldwin of Boulogne is crowned the first King of Jerusalem in the Church of the Nativity in Bethlehem.
- 1130 – Count Roger II of Sicily is crowned the first king of Sicily.
- 1261 – Eleven-year-old John IV Laskaris of the restored Eastern Roman Empire is deposed and blinded by orders of his co-ruler Michael VIII Palaiologos.
- 1356 – Charles IV, Holy Roman Emperor, promulgates the Golden Bull, a constitution for his empire.
- 1492 – The carrack Santa María, commanded by Christopher Columbus, runs onto a reef off Haiti due to an improper watch.
- 1553 – Battle of Tucapel: Mapuche rebels under Lautaro defeat the Spanish conquistadors and executes the governor of Chile, Pedro de Valdivia.
- 1559 – Pope Pius IV is elected, four months after his predecessor's death.

=== 1601–1900 ===
- 1724 – J. S. Bach leads the first performance of Gelobet seist du, Jesu Christ, BWV 91, in Leipzig, based on Luther's 1524 Christmas hymn.
- 1725 – J. S. Bach leads the first performance of the Christmas cantata Unser Mund sei voll Lachens, BWV 110, making laughter audible in singing.
- 1758 – Halley's Comet is sighted by Johann Georg Palitzsch, confirming Edmund Halley's prediction of its passage. This was the first passage of a comet predicted ahead of time.
- 1766 – Mapuches in Chile launch a series of surprise attacks against the Spanish starting the Mapuche uprising of 1766.
- 1776 – American Revolutionary War: General George Washington and the Continental Army cross the Delaware River at night to attack Hessian forces serving Great Britain at Trenton, New Jersey, the next day.
- 1793 – Northwest Indian War: General "Mad Anthony" Wayne and a 300 man detachment identify the site of St. Clair's 1791 defeat by the large number of unburied human remains at modern Fort Recovery, Ohio.
- 1809 – Dr. Ephraim McDowell performs the first ovariotomy, removing a 22-pound tumor.
- 1814 – Rev. Samuel Marsden holds the first Christian service on land in New Zealand at Rangihoua Bay.
- 1815 – The Handel and Haydn Society, oldest continually performing arts organization in the United States, gives its first performance.
- 1826 – The Eggnog Riot at the United States Military Academy concludes after beginning the previous evening.
- 1831 – The Great Jamaican Slave Revolt begins; up to 20% of Jamaica's slaves mobilize in an ultimately unsuccessful fight for freedom.
- 1837 – Second Seminole War: American general Zachary Taylor leads 1,100 troops against the Seminoles at the Battle of Lake Okeechobee.
- 1868 – Pardons for ex-Confederates: United States President Andrew Johnson grants an unconditional pardon to all Confederate veterans.
- 1870 – Wagner's Siegfried Idyll is first performed.

=== 1901–present ===
- 1913 – Disfellowshipped Adventist lay preacher Felix Manalo begins the new religious movement known as the Iglesia ni Cristo with the baptism of its first members.
- 1914 – World War I: A series of unofficial truces occur across the Western Front to celebrate Christmas.
- 1915 – The National Protection War breaks out against the Empire of China, as military leaders Cai E and Tang Jiyao proclaim the independence of Yunnan and begin a campaign to restore the Republic.
- 1927 – B. R. Ambedkar and his followers burn copies of the Manusmriti in Mahad, Maharashtra, to protest its treatment of Dalit people.
- 1932 – A magnitude 7.6 earthquake in Gansu, China kills 275 people.
- 1941 – Admiral Chester W. Nimitz, appointed commander of the U.S. Pacific Fleet on December 17, arrives at Pearl Harbor.
- 1941 – World War II: Battle of Hong Kong ends, beginning the Japanese occupation of Hong Kong.
- 1941 – Admiral Émile Muselier seizes the archipelago of Saint Pierre and Miquelon, which become the first part of France to be liberated by the Free French Forces.
- 1946 – The first European self-sustaining nuclear chain reaction is initiated within the Soviet Union's F-1 nuclear reactor.
- 1950 – The Stone of Scone, traditional coronation stone of British monarchs, is taken from Westminster Abbey by Scottish nationalist students. It later turns up in Scotland on April 11, 1951.
- 1951 – A bomb explodes at the home of Harry T. Moore and Harriette V. S. Moore, early leaders of the Civil Rights Movement, killing Harry instantly and fatally wounding Harriette.
- 1962 – The Soviet Union conducts its final above-ground nuclear weapon test, in anticipation of the 1963 Partial Nuclear Test Ban Treaty.
- 1963 – Turkish Cypriot Bayrak Radio begins transmitting in Cyprus after Turkish Cypriots are forcibly excluded from Cyprus Broadcasting Corporation.
- 1968 – Apollo program: Apollo 8 performs the first successful Trans-Earth injection (TEI) maneuver, sending the crew and spacecraft on a trajectory back to Earth from Lunar orbit.
- 1968 – Kilvenmani massacre: Forty-four Dalits (untouchables) are burnt to death in Kizhavenmani village, Tamil Nadu, a retaliation for a campaign for higher wages by Dalit laborers.
- 1971 – A fire at the Daeyeonggak Hotel in Seoul, South Korea kills 164 people.
- 1976 – EgyptAir Flight 864, a Boeing 707-366C, crashes on approach to Don Mueang International Airport, killing 71 people.
- 1977 – Israeli Prime Minister Menachem Begin meets in Egypt with its president Anwar Sadat.
- 1986 – Iraqi Airways Flight 163, a Boeing 737-270C, is hijacked and crashes in Arar, Saudi Arabia, killing 63 people.
- 1989 – Romanian Revolution: Deposed President of Romania Nicolae Ceaușescu and his wife, Elena, are condemned to death and executed after a summary trial.
- 1991 – Mikhail Gorbachev resigns as President of the Soviet Union (the union itself is dissolved the next day). Ukraine's referendum is finalized and Ukraine officially leaves the Soviet Union.
- 1996 – The body of American child beauty queen JonBenét Ramsey was found in her family's Boulder, Colorado, home. Her murder remains unsolved.
- 1999 – Cubana de Aviación Flight 310, a Yakovlev Yak-42, crashes near Bejuma, Carabobo State, Venezuela, killing 22 people.
- 2003 – UTA Flight 141, a Boeing 727-223, crashes at the Cotonou Airport in Benin, killing 141 people.
- 2003 – The ill-fated Beagle 2 probe, released from the Mars Express spacecraft on December 19, stops transmitting shortly before its scheduled landing.
- 2004 – The Cassini orbiter releases Huygens probe which successfully landed on Saturn's moon Titan on January 14, 2005.
- 2007 – A Siberian tiger named Tatania escapes her exhibit at the San Francisco Zoo and attacks three people, killing one and injuring two more.
- 2012 – An Antonov An-72 plane crashes close to the city of Shymkent, killing 27 people.
- 2012 – Air Bagan Flight 011, a Fokker 100, crashes on approach to Heho Airport in Heho, Myanmar, killing two people.
- 2016 – A Russian Defence Ministry Tupolev Tu-154 carrying members of the Alexandrov Ensemble crashes into the Black Sea shortly after takeoff, killing all 92 people on board.
- 2019 – Twenty people are killed and thousands are left homeless by Typhoon Phanfone in the Philippines.
- 2020 – An explosion in Nashville, Tennessee, occurs, leaving three civilians in the hospital.
- 2021 – The James Webb Space Telescope is launched.
- 2024 – Azerbaijan Airlines Flight 8243 crashes in Aktau, Kazakhstan, killing 38 of its occupants.

== Births ==
=== Pre-1600 ===
- 1250 – John IV Laskaris, Byzantine emperor (died 1305)
- 1281 – Alice de Lacy, 4th Countess of Lincoln (died 1348)
- 1400 – John Sutton, 1st Baron Dudley, Lord Lieutenant of Ireland (died 1487)
- 1424 – Margaret Stewart, Dauphine of France (died 1445)
- 1461 – Christina of Saxony, Queen consort of Denmark (died 1521)
- 1490 – Francesco Marinoni, Italian Roman Catholic priest (died 1562)
- 1493 – Antoinette de Bourbon, French noblewoman (died 1583)
- 1505 – Christine of Saxony, German noblewoman (died 1549)
- 1564 – Johannes Buxtorf, German Calvinist theologian (died 1629)
- 1583 – Orlando Gibbons, English organist and composer (died 1625)
- 1584 – Margaret of Austria, Queen of Spain (died 1611)

=== 1601–1900 ===
- 1601 – Ernest I, Duke of Saxe-Gotha (died 1675)
- 1628 – Noël Coypel, French painter and educator (died 1707)
- 1642 – Isaac Newton, English physicist and mathematician (died 1727)
- 1652 – Archibald Pitcairne, Scottish medical doctor, anatomist and scholar (died 1713)
- 1665 – Lady Grizel Baillie, Scottish-English poet and songwriter (died 1746)
- 1674 – Thomas Halyburton, Scottish minister and theologian (died 1712)
- 1686 – Giovanni Battista Somis, Italian violinist and composer (died 1763)
- 1700 – Leopold II, Prince of Anhalt-Dessau (died 1758)
- 1711 – Jean-Joseph de Mondonville, French violinist and composer (died 1772)
- 1716 – Johann Jakob Reiske, German medical doctor and scholar (died 1774)
- 1717 – Pope Pius VI (died 1799)
- 1728 – Johann Adam Hiller, German composer and conductor (died 1804)
- 1730 – Filippo Mazzei, Italian-American medical doctor and philosopher (died 1816)
- 1745 – Chevalier de Saint-Georges, Caribbean-French violinist, composer, and conductor (died 1799)
- 1757 – Benjamin Pierce, American general and politician, 17th Governor of New Hampshire (died 1839)
- 1766 – Christmas Evans, Welsh Nonconformist preacher (died 1838)
- 1771 – Dorothy Wordsworth, English diarist and poet (died 1855)
- 1776 – Sydney, Lady Morgan, Irish author and poet (died 1859)
- 1810 – L. L. Langstroth, American apiarist, clergyman and teacher (died 1895)
- 1821 – Clara Barton, American nurse and humanitarian, founder of the American Red Cross (died 1912)
- 1825 – Stephen F. Chadwick, American lawyer and politician, 5th Governor of Oregon (died 1895)
- 1829 – Patrick Gilmore, Irish-American composer and bandleader (died 1892)
- 1856 – Pud Galvin, American baseball player and manager (died 1902)
- 1861 – Francis Henry Buzzacott, American hunter, explorer and army scout famous for writing Buzzacott's Masterpiece (died 1947)
- 1861 – Madan Mohan Malaviya, Indian educator, lawyer, and politician, President of the Indian National Congress (died 1946)
- 1865 – Evangeline Booth, English 4th General of The Salvation Army (died 1950)
- 1869 – Charles Finger, English-American journalist and author (died 1941)
- 1872 – Helena Rubinstein, Polish-American businesswoman and philanthropist (died 1965)
- 1873 – Otto Frederick Hunziker, Swiss-American agriculturalist and educator (died 1959)
- 1874 – Lina Cavalieri, Italian soprano and actress (died 1944)
- 1875 – Francis Aveling, Canadian psychologist and priest (died 1941)
- 1875 – Theodor Innitzer, Austrian cardinal (died 1955)
- 1876 – Muhammad Ali Jinnah, Indian-Pakistani lawyer and politician, 1st Governor-General of Pakistan (died 1948)
- 1876 – Adolf Otto Reinhold Windaus, German chemist and academic, Nobel Prize laureate (died 1959)
- 1878 – Louis Chevrolet, American race car driver and businessman, co-founded Chevrolet (died 1941)
- 1878 – Noël, Countess of Rothes, British philanthropist, social leader and heroine of Titanic disaster (died 1956)
- 1878 – Joseph M. Schenck, Russian-American film producer (died 1961)
- 1883 – Hugo Bergmann, Czech-Israeli philosopher and academic (died 1975)
- 1883 – Hana Meisel, Belarusian-Israeli agronomist and politician (died 1972)
- 1884 – Samuel Berger, American boxer (died 1925)
- 1884 – Evelyn Nesbit, American model and actress (died 1967)
- 1886 – Malak Hifni Nasif, Egyptian poet and activist (died 1918)
- 1886 – Kid Ory, American trombonist and bandleader (died 1973)
- 1887 – Conrad Hilton, American entrepreneur (died 1979)
- 1889 – Lila Bell Wallace, American publisher and philanthropist, co-founded Reader's Digest (died 1984)
- 1890 – Noel Odell, English geologist and mountaineer (died 1987)
- 1891 – Kenneth Anderson, Indian-English general and politician, Governor of Gibraltar (died 1959)
- 1891 – Clarrie Grimmett, New Zealand-Australian cricketer (died 1980)
- 1899 – Humphrey Bogart, American actor (died 1957)

=== 1901–present ===
- 1901 – Princess Alice, Duchess of Gloucester (died 2004)
- 1902 – William Bell, American tuba player and educator (died 1971)
- 1902 – Barton MacLane, American actor, playwright, and screenwriter (died 1969)
- 1903 – Antiochos Evangelatos, Greek composer and conductor (died 1981)
- 1904 – Gerhard Herzberg, German-Canadian physicist and chemist, Nobel Prize laureate (died 1999)
- 1904 – Philip Vera Cruz, Filipino-American labor leader and farmworker (died 1994)
- 1906 – Lew Grade, Baron Grade, Ukrainian-English film producer (died 1998)
- 1906 – Ernst Ruska, German physicist and academic, Nobel Prize laureate (died 1988)
- 1907 – Cab Calloway, American singer-songwriter and bandleader (died 1994)
- 1907 – Mike Mazurki, Ukrainian-American wrestler and actor (died 1990)
- 1907 – Glenn McCarthy, American businessman, founded the Shamrock Hotel (died 1988)
- 1908 – Quentin Crisp, English author and illustrator (died 1999)
- 1908 – Ernest L. Massad, American general (died 1993)
- 1908 – Jo-Jo Moore, American baseball player (died 2001)
- 1909 – Zora Arkus-Duntov, Belgian-American engineer (died 1996)
- 1911 – Louise Bourgeois, French-American sculptor and painter (died 2010)
- 1913 – Candy Candido, American singer, bass player, and voice actor (died 1999)
- 1913 – Tony Martin, American singer (died 2012)
- 1914 – James Fletcher Jnr, New Zealand businessman (died 2007)
- 1914 – Oscar Lewis, American anthropologist of Latin America (died 1970)
- 1915 – Pete Rugolo, Italian-American composer and producer (died 2011)
- 1916 – Ahmed Ben Bella, Algerian soldier and politician, 1st President of Algeria (died 2012)
- 1917 – Arseny Mironov, Russian scientist, engineer, pilot, oldest active researcher in aircraft aerodynamics and flight testing (died 2019)
- 1917 – Lincoln Verduga Loor, Ecuadorian journalist and politician (died 2009)
- 1919 – Naushad Ali, Indian composer and director (died 2006)
- 1919 – Paul David, Canadian cardiologist and politician, founded the Montreal Heart Institute (died 1999)
- 1919 – Noele Gordon, English actress (died 1985)
- 1921 – Zaib-un-Nissa Hamidullah, Indian-Pakistani journalist and author (died 2000)
- 1921 – Steve Otto, Polish-Canadian lawyer and politician (died 1989)
- 1922 – William Demby, American author (died 2013)
- 1923 – René Girard, French-American historian, philosopher, and critic (died 2015)
- 1923 – Louis Lane, American conductor and educator (died 2016)
- 1924 – Rod Serling, American screenwriter and producer, created The Twilight Zone (died 1975)
- 1924 – Atal Bihari Vajpayee, Indian poet and politician, 10th Prime Minister of India (died 2018)
- 1925 – Carlos Castaneda, Peruvian-American anthropologist and author (died 1998)
- 1925 – Ned Garver, American baseball player (died 2017)
- 1925 – Sam Pollock, Canadian businessman (died 2007)
- 1926 – Enrique Jorrín, Cuban violinist and composer (died 1987)
- 1927 – Nellie Fox, American baseball player and coach (died 1975)
- 1927 – Ram Narayan, Indian sarangi player (died 2024)
- 1928 – Irish McCalla, American actress and model (died 2002)
- 1928 – Dick Miller, American actor, director, and screenwriter (died 2019)
- 1929 – Christine M. Jones, American educator and politician (died 2013)
- 1929 – China Machado, Chinese-born Portuguese-American fashion model, editor and television producer (died 2016)
- 1929 – Chris Kenner, American singer and songwriter (died 1976)
- 1930 – Emmanuel Agassi, Iranian-American boxer and coach (died 2021)
- 1930 – Armenak Alachachian, Armenian basketball player and coach (died 2017)
- 1930 – Mary Rose Tuitt, Montserrat politician (died 2005)
- 1932 – Mabel King, American actress and singer (died 1999)
- 1933 – Basil Heatley, English runner (died 2019)
- 1935 – Sadiq al-Mahdi, Sudanese politician, Prime Minister of Sudan (died 2020)
- 1935 – Stephen Barnett, American scholar and academic (died 2009)
- 1935 – Jeanne Hopkins Lucas, American educator and politician (died 2007)
- 1936 – Princess Alexandra of Kent, The Honourable Lady Ogilvy
- 1936 – Ismail Merchant, Indian-English director and producer (died 2005)
- 1937 – Maung Aye, Burmese military officer
- 1937 – O'Kelly Isley Jr., American R&B/soul singer-songwriter (died 1986)
- 1938 – Duane Armstrong, American painter
- 1938 – Noel Picard, Canadian ice hockey player (died 2017)
- 1939 – Ghulam Ahmad Bilour, Pakistani businessman and politician
- 1939 – Bob James, American keyboard player, songwriter, and producer
- 1939 – Akong Rinpoche, Tibetan-Chinese spiritual leader (died 2013)
- 1940 – Hilary Spurling, English journalist and author
- 1941 – Kenneth Calman, Scottish medical doctor and academic
- 1942 – Françoise Dürr, French tennis player and coach
- 1942 – Barbara Follett, English politician
- 1942 – Barry Goldberg, American keyboard player, songwriter, and producer (died 2025)
- 1942 – Enrique Morente, Spanish singer-songwriter (died 2010)
- 1943 – Wilson Fittipaldi Júnior, Brazilian race car driver and businessman (died 2024)
- 1943 – Ravish Malhotra, Indian pilot and military officer
- 1943 – Eve Pollard, English journalist and author
- 1943 – Hanna Schygulla, German actress
- 1943 – Jacqui McShee, English singer
- 1944 – Kenny Everett, British comedian and broadcaster (died 1995)
- 1944 – Jairzinho, Brazilian footballer
- 1944 – Sam Strahan, New Zealand rugby player (died 2019)
- 1945 – Rick Berman, American screenwriter and producer
- 1945 – Mike Pringle, Zambian-Scottish lawyer and politician
- 1945 – Noel Redding, English singer-songwriter and bass player (died 2003)
- 1945 – Ken Stabler, American football player and sportscaster (died 2015)
- 1946 – Jimmy Buffett, American singer-songwriter, guitarist, producer, and actor (died 2023)
- 1948 – Merry Clayton, American singer and actress
- 1948 – Kay Hymowitz, American sociologist and writer
- 1948 – Barbara Mandrell, American singer-songwriter and actress
- 1948 – Joel Santana, Brazilian footballer and manager
- 1949 – Simone Bittencourt de Oliveira, Brazilian singer
- 1949 – Nawaz Sharif, Pakistani politician, 12th Prime Minister of Pakistan
- 1950 – Peter Boardman, English mountaineer and author (died 1982)
- 1950 – Karl Rove, American political strategist and activist
- 1950 – Manny Trillo, Venezuelan baseball player and manager
- 1951 – Warren Robinett, American video game designer
- 1952 – Tolossa Kotu, Ethiopian runner and coach
- 1952 – Desireless, French singer and songwriter
- 1953 – Kaarlo Maaninka, Finnish runner
- 1954 – Annie Lennox, Scottish singer-songwriter and pianist
- 1957 – Mansoor Akhtar, Pakistani cricketer
- 1957 – Chris Kamara, English footballer and sportscaster
- 1958 – Cheryl Chase, American voice actress and singer
- 1958 – Rickey Henderson, American baseball player and coach (died 2024)
- 1958 – Konstantin Kinchev, Russian singer-songwriter and guitarist
- 1958 – Alannah Myles, Canadian singer-songwriter and actress
- 1959 – Michael P. Anderson, American colonel, pilot, and astronaut (died 2003)
- 1959 – Ramdas Athawale, Indian poet and politician
- 1961 – Íngrid Betancourt, Colombian political scientist and politician
- 1961 – Ghislaine Maxwell, British socialite, former owner of the TerraMar Project, and sex offender.
- 1962 – Francis Dunnery, English musician
- 1964 – Ian Bostridge, English tenor
- 1964 – Gary McAllister, Scottish footballer and manager
- 1964 – Bob Stanley, British musician and writer
- 1965 – Ed Davey, English politician, Leader of the Liberal Democrats
- 1965 – Dmitri Mironov, Russian ice hockey player
- 1965 – David Rath, Czech medical doctor and politician
- 1966 – Toshi Arai, Japanese race car driver
- 1967 – Andreas Haitzer, Austrian politician
- 1967 – Jason Thirsk, American bass player (died 1996)
- 1968 – Jim Dowd, American ice hockey player
- 1969 – Nicolas Godin, French musician
- 1969 – Noel Goldthorpe, Australian rugby league player
- 1969 – Frederick Onyancha, Kenyan runner
- 1970 – Emmanuel Amunike, Nigerian footballer and manager
- 1970 – Rodney Dent, American basketball player
- 1971 – Justin Trudeau, Canadian educator and politician, 23rd Prime Minister of Canada
- 1972 – Qu Yunxia, Chinese runner
- 1973 – Robbie Elliott, English footballer and coach
- 1973 – Chris Harris, American wrestler
- 1973 – Daisuke Miura, Japanese baseball player and coach
- 1973 – Alexandre Trudeau, Canadian journalist and director
- 1975 – Hideki Okajima, Japanese baseball player
- 1975 – Choi Sung-yong, South Korean footballer and manager
- 1975 – Marcus Trescothick, English cricketer
- 1976 – Tuomas Holopainen, Finnish keyboard player, songwriter, and producer
- 1976 – Atko Väikmeri, Estonian footballer
- 1976 – Armin van Buuren, Dutch DJ and record producer
- 1977 – Ali Tandoğan, Turkish footballer
- 1977 – Israel Vázquez, Mexican boxer (died 2024)
- 1978 – Simon Jones, Welsh cricketer
- 1978 – Joel Porter, Australian footballer and manager
- 1978 – Jeremy Strong, American actor
- 1979 – Ferman Akgül, Turkish singer-songwriter
- 1979 – Laurent Bonnart, French footballer
- 1979 – Robert Huff, English race car driver
- 1979 – Hyun Young-min, South Korean footballer
- 1980 – Laura Sadler, English actress (died 2003)
- 1980 – Marcus Trufant, American football player
- 1981 – Trenesha Biggers, American wrestler and model
- 1981 – Camille Herron, American ultramarathon runner
- 1981 – Christian Holst, Danish-Faroese footballer
- 1981 – Willy Taveras, Dominican baseball player
- 1982 – Shawn Andrews, American football player
- 1982 – Rob Edwards, Welsh footballer
- 1982 – Ethan Kath, Canadian keyboard player, songwriter and producer
- 1982 – Chris Rene, American singer-songwriter and producer
- 1984 – Chris Cahill, Samoan footballer
- 1984 – Alastair Cook, English cricketer
- 1984 – Chris Richard, American basketball player
- 1985 – Martin Mathathi, Kenyan runner
- 1985 – Rusev, Bulgarian-American professional wrestler
- 1985 – Yulia Svyrydenko, Ukrainian politician, 19th Prime Minister of Ukraine
- 1987 – Ceyhun Gülselam, Turkish footballer
- 1987 – Demaryius Thomas, American football player (died 2021)
- 1988 – Eric Gordon, American basketball player
- 1988 – Lukas Hinds-Johnson, German rugby player
- 1988 – Joãozinho, Brazilian footballer
- 1991 – Avu-chan, Japanese musician, songwriter, actor, model and producer
- 1992 – Mitakeumi Hisashi, Japanese sumo wrestler
- 1993 – Emi Takei, Japanese actress, fashion model and singer
- 1996 – Emiliano Buendía, Argentine footballer
- 1999 – Adut Akech, South Sudanese-Australian fashion model
- 2000 – Wilfried Singo, Ivorian footballer

== Deaths ==
=== Pre-1600 ===
- 304 – Saint Anastasia
- 795 – Pope Adrian I
- 820 – Emperor Leo V
- 936 – Zhang Jingda, general of Later Tang
- 940 – Makan ibn Kaki, Iranian general
- 1147 – Guy II, Count of Ponthieu (born c. 1120)
- 1156 – Peter the Venerable, French abbot and saint (born 1092)
- 1156 – Sverker the Elder, king of Sweden
- 1294 – Mestwin II, Duke of Pomerania
- 1395 – Elisabeth, Countess of Neuchâtel, Swiss ruler
- 1406 – Henry III of Castile (born 1379)
- 1505 – George Grey, 2nd Earl of Kent, English politician (born 1454)
- 1553 – Pedro de Valdivia, Spanish explorer and politician, 1st Royal Governor of Chile (born 1500)

=== 1601–1900 ===
- 1634 – Lettice Knollys, English noblewoman (born 1543)
- 1635 – Samuel de Champlain, French soldier, geographer, and explorer (born 1567)
- 1676 – William Cavendish, 1st Duke of Newcastle, English soldier and politician, Lord Lieutenant of Nottinghamshire (born 1592)
- 1676 – Matthew Hale, English lawyer and jurist, Lord Chief Justice of England and Wales (born 1609)
- 1683 – Kara Mustafa Pasha, Ottoman general and politician, 111th Grand Vizier of the Ottoman Empire (born 1634)
- 1708 – Jørgen Thormøhlen, German-Norwegian merchant (born c.1640)
- 1730 – Henry Scott, 1st Earl of Deloraine, Scottish peer and general (born 1676)
- 1758 – James Hervey, English priest and author (born 1714)
- 1784 – Yosa Buson, Japanese poet and painter (born 1716)
- 1796 – Velu Nachiyar, Queen of Sivagangai (born 1730)
- 1824 – Barbara von Krüdener, German mystic and author (born 1764)
- 1824 – William Lawless, Irish revolutionary, later French Army general (born 1772)
- 1866 – Hayrullah Efendi, Ottoman medical doctor, historian, and official (born 1818)
- 1868 – Linus Yale, Jr., American engineer and businessman (born 1821)
- 1875 – Young Tom Morris, Scottish golfer (born 1851)
- 1880 – Fridolin Anderwert, Swiss lawyer and politician, President of the Swiss National Council (born 1828)

=== 1901–present ===
- 1916 – Albert Chmielowski, Polish saint, founded the Albertine Brothers (born 1845)
- 1921 – Vladimir Korolenko, Russian journalist, author, and activist (born 1853)
- 1925 – Karl Abraham, German psychoanalyst and author (born 1877)
- 1926 – Emperor Taishō of Japan (born 1879)
- 1928 – Miles Burke, American boxer (born 1885)
- 1930 – Jakob Mändmets, Estonian journalist and author (born 1871)
- 1933 – Francesc Macià, Catalan colonel and politician, 122nd President of Catalonia (born 1859)
- 1935 – Paul Bourget, French author and critic (born 1852)
- 1938 – Karel Čapek, Czech author and playwright (born 1890)
- 1940 – Agnes Ayres, American actress (born 1898)
- 1941 – Richard S. Aldrich, American lawyer and politician (born 1884)
- 1944 – George Steer, South African-English journalist and author (born 1909)
- 1946 – W. C. Fields, American actor, comedian, juggler, and screenwriter (born 1880)
- 1947 – Gaspar G. Bacon, American lawyer and politician, 51st Lieutenant Governor of Massachusetts (born 1886)
- 1949 – Leon Schlesinger, American animator and producer, founded Warner Bros. Cartoons (born 1884)
- 1950 – Neil Francis Hawkins, English politician (born 1903)
- 1952 – Margrethe Mather, American photographer (born 1886)
- 1953 – Patsy Donovan, Irish-American baseball player and manager (born 1865)
- 1953 – William Haselden, British cartoonist (born 1872)
- 1956 – Robert Walser, Swiss author and playwright (born 1878)
- 1957 – Charles Pathé, French record producer, founded Pathé Records (born 1863)
- 1961 – Owen Brewster, American captain, lawyer, and politician, 54th Governor of Maine (born 1888)
- 1961 – Otto Loewi, German-American pharmacologist and academic, Nobel Prize laureate (born 1873)
- 1963 – Tristan Tzara, Romanian-French poet, playwright, painter, and critic (born 1896)
- 1970 – Michael Peto, Hungarian-English photographer and journalist (born 1908)
- 1973 – İsmet İnönü, Turkish general and politician, 2nd President of Turkey (born 1884)
- 1973 – Gabriel Voisin, French pilot and engineer (born 1880)
- 1975 – Gaston Gallimard, French publisher, founded Éditions Gallimard (born 1881)
- 1975 – Gunnar Kangro, Estonian mathematician and author (born 1913)
- 1977 – Charlie Chaplin, English actor and director (born 1889)
- 1979 – Joan Blondell, American actress and singer (born 1906)
- 1979 – Jordi Bonet, Canadian painter and sculptor (born 1932)
- 1980 – Fred Emney, English actor and comedian (born 1900)
- 1983 – Joan Miró, Spanish painter and sculptor (born 1893)
- 1988 – Shōhei Ōoka, Japanese author and critic (born 1909)
- 1988 – Edward Pelham-Clinton, 10th Duke of Newcastle, English entomologist and lepidopterist (born 1920)
- 1989 – Benny Binion, American poker player and businessman (born 1904)
- 1989 – Elena Ceaușescu, Romanian politician, First Lady of Romania (born 1916)
- 1989 – Nicolae Ceaușescu, Romanian general and politician, 1st President of Romania (born 1918)
- 1989 – Betty Garde, American actress (born 1905)
- 1989 – Frederick F. Houser, American judge and politician, 34th Lieutenant Governor of California (born 1905)
- 1989 – Billy Martin, American baseball player and manager (born 1928)
- 1989 – Robert Pirosh, American director and screenwriter (born 1910)
- 1991 – Wilbur Snyder, American football player and wrestler (born 1929)
- 1992 – Monica Dickens, British-American nurse and author (born 1915)
- 1993 – Pierre Victor Auger, French physicist and academic (born 1899)
- 1994 – Zail Singh, Indian politician, 7th President of India (born 1916)
- 1995 – Emmanuel Levinas, Lithuanian-French philosopher and academic (born 1906)
- 1995 – Dean Martin, American singer and actor (born 1917)
- 1995 – Chang Kee-ryo, Korean surgeon (born 1914)
- 1995 – Vincent Patriarca, Italian-American aviator and mercenary (born 1914)
- 1996 – Bill Hewitt, Canadian sportscaster (born 1928)
- 1997 – Anatoli Boukreev, Kazakh mountaineer and explorer (born 1958)
- 1997 – Denver Pyle, American actor (born 1920)
- 1998 – John Pulman, English snooker player (born 1923)
- 2000 – Neil Hawke, Australian cricketer and footballer (born 1939)
- 2000 – Willard Van Orman Quine, American philosopher and academic (born 1908)
- 2001 – Alfred A. Tomatis, French otolaryngologist and academic (born 1920)
- 2003 – Nicholas Mavroules, American politician (born 1929)
- 2004 – Gennadi Strekalov, Russian engineer and astronaut (born 1940)
- 2005 – Derek Bailey, English guitarist (born 1930)
- 2005 – Robert Barbers, Filipino police officer, lawyer, and politician, 15th Secretary of the Interior and Local Government (born 1944)
- 2005 – Birgit Nilsson, Swedish operatic soprano (born 1918)
- 2005 – Joseph Pararajasingham, Sri Lankan journalist, businessman, and politician (born 1934)
- 2006 – James Brown, American singer-songwriter (born 1933)
- 2007 – Des Barrick, English cricketer (born 1927)
- 2007 – Jim Beauchamp, American baseball player and coach (born 1939)
- 2008 – Eartha Kitt, American singer and actress (born 1927)
- 2009 – Vic Chesnutt, American singer-songwriter and guitarist (born 1964)
- 2010 – Carlos Andrés Pérez, Venezuelan politician, 66th President of Venezuela (born 1922)
- 2011 – Giorgio Bocca, Italian journalist (born 1920)
- 2011 – Jim Sherwood, American saxophonist (born 1942)
- 2011 – Simms Taback, American author and illustrator (born 1932)
- 2012 – Erico Aumentado, Filipino journalist, lawyer, and politician (born 1940)
- 2012 – Halfdan Hegtun, Norwegian radio host and politician (born 1918)
- 2012 – Joe Krivak, American football player and coach (born 1935)
- 2012 – Turki bin Sultan, Saudi Arabian politician (born 1959)
- 2012 – Şerafettin Elçi, Turkish lawyer, politician, government minister (born 1938)
- 2013 – Anthony J. Bryant, American historian and author (born 1961)
- 2013 – David R. Harris, English geographer, anthropologist, archaeologist and academic (born 1930)
- 2013 – Wayne Harrison, English footballer (born 1967)
- 2013 – Mike Hegan, American baseball player and sportscaster (born 1942)
- 2013 – Lola Lange, Canadian rural feminist and appointee to the Royal Commission on the Status of Women (born 1922)
- 2013 – Mel Mathay, Filipino politician, 8th Mayor of Quezon City (born 1932)
- 2014 – Ricardo Porro, Cuban-French architect (born 1925)
- 2014 – Geoff Pullar, English cricketer (born 1935)
- 2014 – David Ryall, English actor (born 1935)
- 2015 – George Clayton Johnson, American author and screenwriter (born 1929)
- 2015 – Dorothy M. Murdock, American author and historian (born 1961)
- 2016 – Valery Khalilov, Russian military musician and composer (born 1952)
- 2016 – George Michael, British singer and songwriter (born 1963)
- 2016 – Vera Rubin, American astronomer (born 1928)
- 2017 – D. Herbert Lipson, American magazine publisher (Philadelphia, Boston) (born 1929)
- 2018 – Sulagitti Narasamma, Indian midwife (born 1920)
- 2019 – Ari Behn, Norwegian writer (born 1972)
- 2020 – K. C. Jones, American basketball player and coach (born 1932)
- 2021 – Wayne Thiebaud, American artist (born 1920)
- 2022 – Fabián O'Neill, Uruguayan footballer (born 1973)
- 2023 – Jim Breaks, British wrestler (born 1940)
- 2024 – Britt Allcroft, English writer (born 1943)
- 2024 – Bill Bergey, American football player (born 1945)
- 2024 – Jax Dane, American professional wrestler (born 1976)
- 2024 – M. T. Vasudevan Nair, Indian author and screenwriter (born 1933)
- 2024 – Osamu Suzuki, Japanese businessman (born 1930)

== Holidays and observances ==
- Christmas Day, Christian festival commemorating the birth of Jesus. (Internationally observed)
- Christian feast day:
  - Anastasia of Sirmium (Catholic Church)
  - Stephen (Armenian Apostolic Church)
  - December 25 (Eastern Orthodox liturgics)
- Children's Day (Cameroon, Central African Republic, Chad, Equatorial Guinea, Democratic Republic of the Congo, Gabon, Republic of Congo)
- Tulsi Pujan Diwas (India)
- Constitution Day (Taiwan)
- Good Governance Day (India)
- Quaid-e-Azam's Day (Pakistan)
- Takanakuy (Chumbivilcas Province, Peru)
