= Mountain man =

Men living remotely in the Rocky Mountains of North America

Mountain men
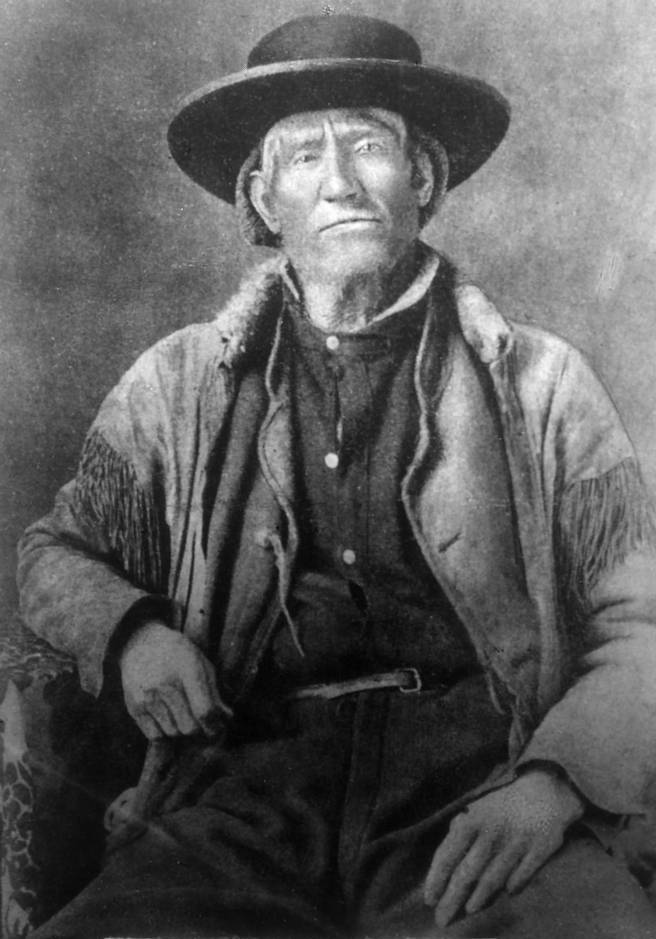
- Jim Bridger, one of the most famous mountain men

Occupation
- Occupation type: Frontiersman (1800–1890)
- Activity sectors: Rocky Mountains, Sierra Nevada, Cascade Range, Alaska Range, Great Plains, Great Lakes, Great Basin Desert, Appalachian Mountains, Ozark Mountains, rivers

Description
- Competencies: Skinning, marksmanship, archery, self-defense, hunting, fishing, logging, fur trapping, trading, canoeing, mountaineering, mining, horsemanship, tracking, exploring, mental and physical toughness, wilderness survival skills, medicine, frontier doctoring, diplomacy, English, French, Spanish, Russian, and Native American languages
- Related jobs: Longhunter, Fisherman, Coureur des bois, Surveyor, Woodsman, Fur trappers, Miner

A mountain man is an explorer who lives in the wilderness and makes his living from hunting, fishing and trapping. Mountain men were most common in the North American Rocky Mountains from about 1810 through to the 1880s (with a peak population in the early 1840s). They were instrumental in opening up the various emigrant trails (widened into wagon roads) allowing Americans in the east to settle the new territories of the far west by organized wagon trains traveling over roads explored and in many cases, physically improved by the mountain men and the big fur companies, originally to serve the mule train-based inland fur trade.

Mountain men arose in a geographic and economic expansion that was driven by the lucrative earnings available in the North American fur trade, in the wake of the various 1806–1807 published accounts of the Lewis and Clark Expedition findings about the Rockies and the Oregon Country. They flourished for more than three decades, but their ability to make a good living through fur trapping had largely ended by the late 1840s—thanks to the rise of the silk trade, the collapse of the North American beaver-based fur trade since the 1830s, treaties signed in 1846 and 1848, and an upsurge in migration to officially settled western coastal territories in the United States.

Many of the mountain men settled into jobs as Army scouts, wagon train guides or settled throughout the lands which they had helped open up. Others, like William Sublette, opened fort-trading posts along the Oregon Trail to serve the remnant fur trade and the settlers heading west.

Mountain men figure prominently in American Great Plains and Mountain West history. Nebraska features them at the Museum of the Fur Trade, while there is a Museum of the Mountain Man in Wyoming, which publishes an annual academic journal, the The Rocky Mountain Fur Trade Journal. In 1968, a fraternal society of "American Mountain Men" was founded in Wyoming.

== History ==
Mountain men were most common in the North American Rocky Mountains from about 1810 through to the 1880s. About 3,000 of them ranged the mountains between 1820 and 1840, the peak beaver-harvesting period. John Colter's solo exploration of 1807-1808 made him one of the first Mountain men. While there were many free trappers, most mountain men were employed by major fur companies. The life of a company man was almost militarized. The men had mess groups, hunted and trapped in brigades, and always reported to the head of the trapping party. This man was called a "boosway", a bastardization of the French term bourgeois. He was the leader of the brigade and the head trader.

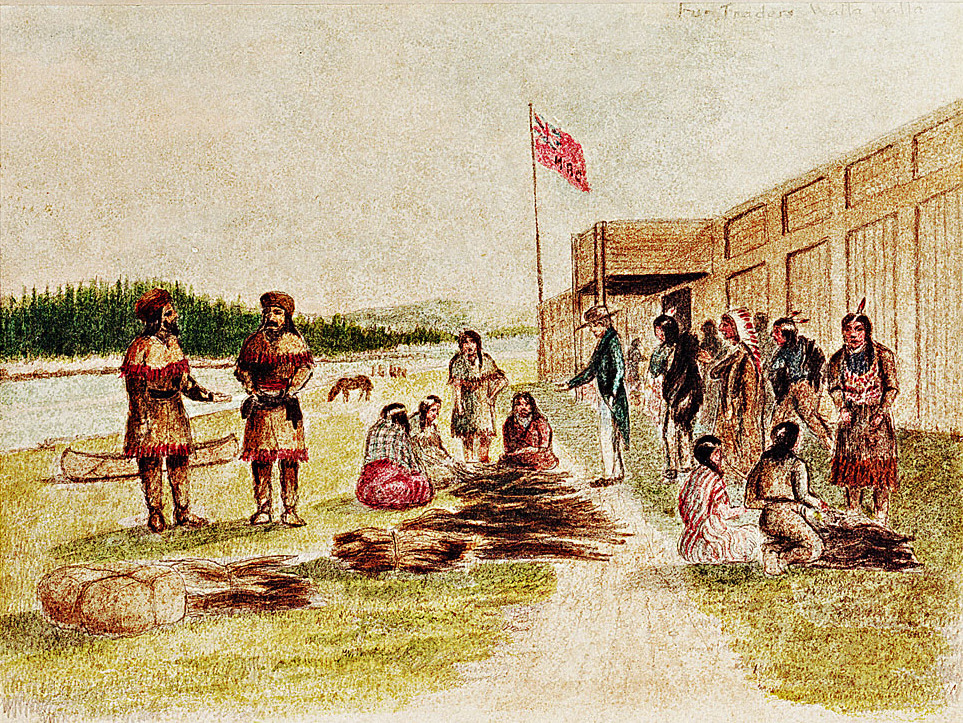
Fur trading at Fort Nez Percé in 1841

Donald Mackenzie, representing the North West Company, held a rendezvous in the Boise River Valley in 1819. The rendezvous system was later implemented by William Henry Ashley of the Rocky Mountain Fur Company, whose company representatives would haul supplies to specific mountain locations in the spring, engage in trading with trappers, and bring pelts back to communities on the Missouri and Mississippi rivers, like St. Louis, in the fall. Ashley sold his business to the outfit of Smith, Jackson, and Sublette. He continued to earn revenue by selling that firm their supplies. This system of rendezvous with trappers continued when other firms, particularly the American Fur Company owned by John Jacob Astor, entered the field.

The annual rendezvous was often held at Horse Creek on the Green River, now called the Upper Green River Rendezvous Site, near present-day Pinedale, Wyoming. Another popular site in the same general area was Pierre's Hole. By the mid-1830s, it attracted 450 to 500 men annually: essentially all the American trappers and traders working in the Rockies as well as numerous Native Americans.

After achieving an American monopoly by 1830, Astor got out of the fur business before its decline. In the late 1830s, the Canadian-based Hudson's Bay Company (HBC) instituted several policies to undercut the American fur trade. During the same years, fashion in Europe shifted away from the formerly popular beaver hats; at the same time, the animal had become over-hunted. The HBC's annual Snake River Expedition was transformed into a trading enterprise. Beginning in 1834, it visited the American rendezvous to buy furs at low prices. The HBC was able to offer manufactured trade goods at prices far below that with which American fur companies could compete. The last rendezvous was held in 1840, when the HBC, along with a decline in demand for and supply of beaver, had effectively put all American fur traders out of business.

By 1841, the American Fur Company and the Rocky Mountain Fur Company were in ruins. By 1846, only some 50 American trappers still worked in the Snake River country, compared to 500 to 600 in 1826. Soon after the strategic victory by the HBC, the Snake River route was used by emigrants as the Oregon Trail, which brought a new form of competition. Former trappers earned money as guides or hunters for the emigrant parties.

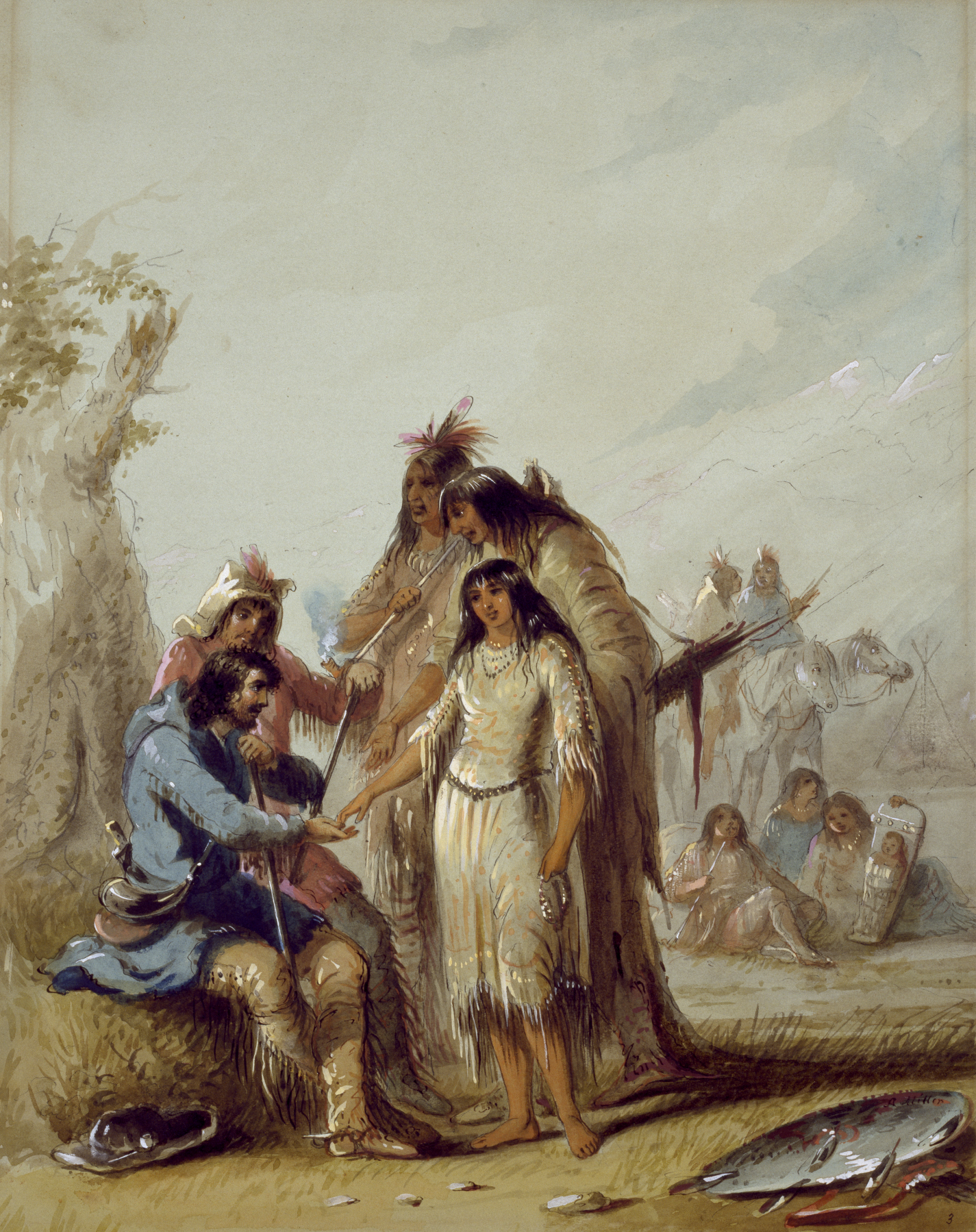
The Trapper's Bride shows a trapper, Francois, paying $600 in trade goods for an Indian woman to be his wife, ca. 1837, by Alfred Jacob Miller.

A second fur trading and supply center grew up in Taos in what is today New Mexico. This trade attracted numerous French Americans from Louisiana and some French Canadian trappers, in addition to Anglo-Americans. Some New Mexican residents also pursued the beaver trade, as Mexican citizens initially had some legal advantages. Trappers and traders in the Southwest covered territory that was generally inaccessible to the large fur companies. It included parts of New Mexico, Nevada, California and central and southern Utah. After the decline in beaver and the fur trade, with some emigrants to the West using the Mormon Trail, former trappers found work as guides and hunters for the traveling parties.

After the short-lived Pacific Fur Company was liquidated, British-Canadian companies controlled the fur trade in the Pacific Northwest, first under the North West Company (NWC) and then the HBC. Both companies undertook numerous measures to prevent American fur traders from competing with them west of the Rocky Mountains, especially in the upper Snake River country. After the HBC took over operations in the Pacific Northwest in 1821, American fur traders in the Snake River country quickly went out business and moved on.

This halted American expansion into the region. After 1825, few American trappers worked west of the Rocky Mountains, and those who did generally found it unprofitable. According to historian Richard Mackie, this policy of the HBC forced American trappers to remain in the Rocky Mountains, which gave rise to the term "mountain men".

Mountain men were instrumental in opening up the various emigrant trails (widened into wagon roads) allowing Americans from the east to settle the new territories of the far west by organized wagon trains traveling over roads explored and, in many cases, physically improved by the mountain men and the big fur companies originally to serve the mule train based inland fur trade. By the time two new international treaties in early 1846 and early 1848 officially settled new western coastal territories on the United States and spurred a large upsurge in migration, the days of mountain men making a good living by fur trapping had largely ended. The fur industry was failing because of over-trapping. Fortuitously, America's ongoing western migration by wagon trains with the goal of claiming cheap lands in the west was building rapidly from a trickle of settlers from 1841's opening of the Oregon Trail to a flood of emigrants headed west by 1847–49 and thereafter well into the later 1880s.

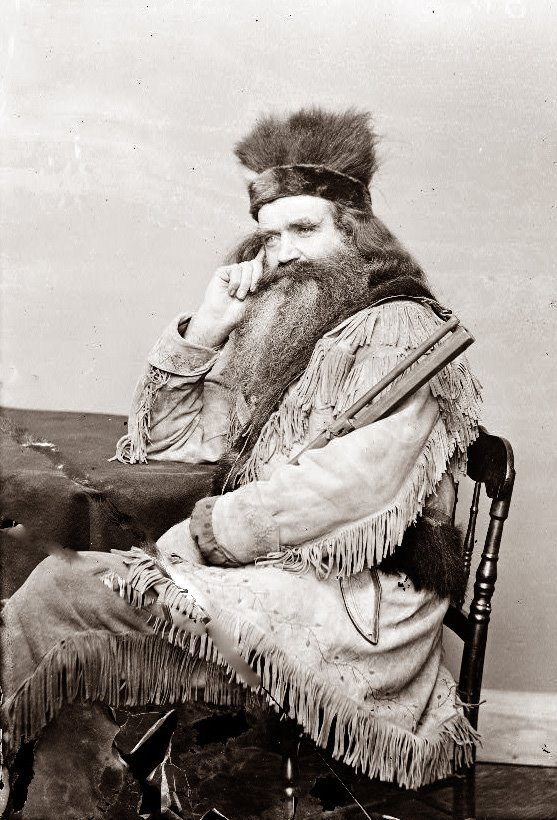
Seth Kinman, a notable 19th century mountain man who claimed to have hunted down around 800 grizzly bears

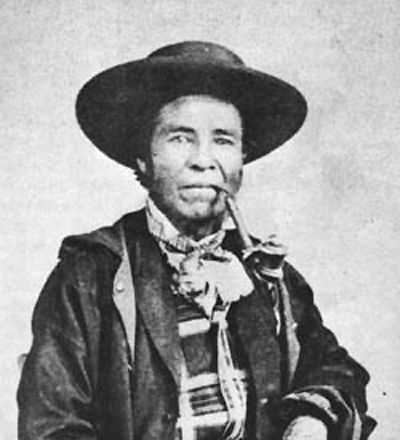
Mariano Medina

By the time the fur trade began to collapse in the 1840s, motivating them to change jobs, the trails they had explored and turned into reliable mule trails and improved gradually into wagon-capable freight roads combined to allow them to work as guides and scouts. As the fur trade declined, mountain man Robert Newell told Jim Bridger: "[W]e are done with this life in the mountains—done with wading in beaver dams, and freezing or starving alternately—done with Indian trading and Indian fighting. The fur trade is dead in the Rocky Mountains, and it is no place for us now if ever it was." At the same time the great push west along the newly opened Oregon Trail built up from a trickle of settlers in 1841 to a steady stream in 1844–46 and then became a flood as the highly organized Mormon migration exploited the road to the Great Salt Lake discovered by mountain man Jim Bridger in 1847–48. The migration would explode in 1849's "The Forty-Niners" in response to the discovery of gold in California in 1848.

== Mode of living ==
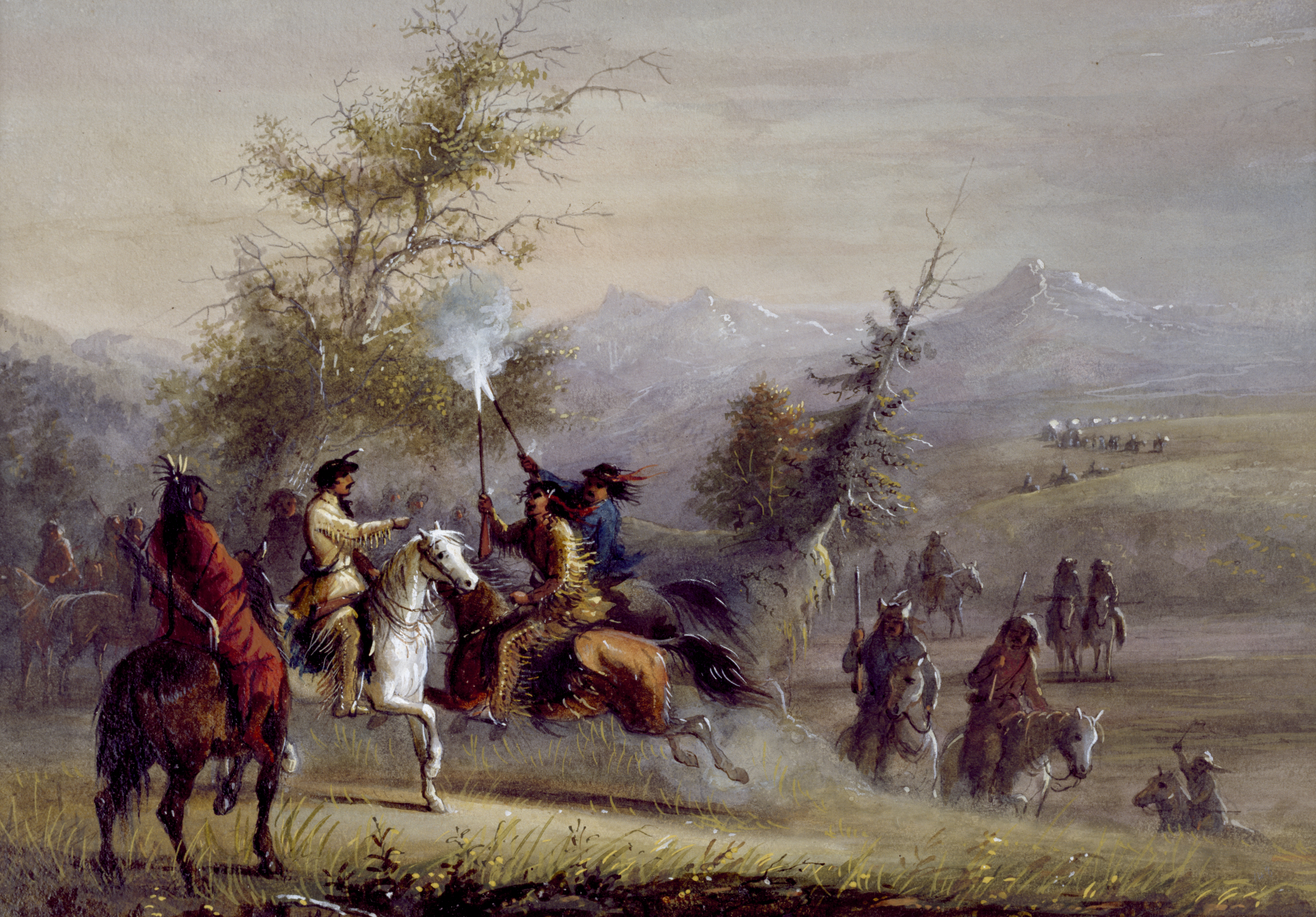
The Greeting, by Alfred Jacob Miller

The life of a mountain man was rugged, and many did not last more than several years in the wilderness. They faced many hazards, especially when exploring unmapped areas: biting insects and other wildlife, bad weather, diseases of all kinds, injuries, and the opposition of Indigenous people who presented constant physical dangers. Grizzly bears were one of the mountain men's greatest enemies. Winters could be brutal, with heavy snowstorms and low temperatures.

In order to stay alive, the men needed keen senses and knowledge of herbal remedies and first aid, among other skills. In summer, they could catch fish, build shelter, and hunt for food and skins. The mountain men dressed in suits made of deer skin that had stiffened after being left outdoors for a time, which gave them some protection against the weapons of particular enemies. There were no doctors in the regions where mountain men worked, and they had to set their own broken bones, tend their wounds, and nurse themselves back to health.

=== Fur trappers ===
A fur trapper was a mountain man who, in today's terms, would be called a free agent. He was independent and traded his pelts to whoever would pay him the best price. That contrasts with a "company man", typically indebted to one fur company for the cost of his gear, who traded only with that company and was often under the direct command of company representatives. Some company men who paid off their debt could become free traders, using the gear they had earned. They might sell to the same company when the price was agreeable or convenient.

=== Historical reenactment ===
Historical reenactment of the dress and lifestyle of a mountain man, sometimes known as buckskinning, allows people to recreate aspects of this historical period. Today's Rocky Mountain Rendezvous and other reenacted events are both history-oriented and social occasions. Some modern men choose a lifestyle similar to that of historical mountain men. They may live and roam in the mountains of the West or in the swamps of the southern United States.

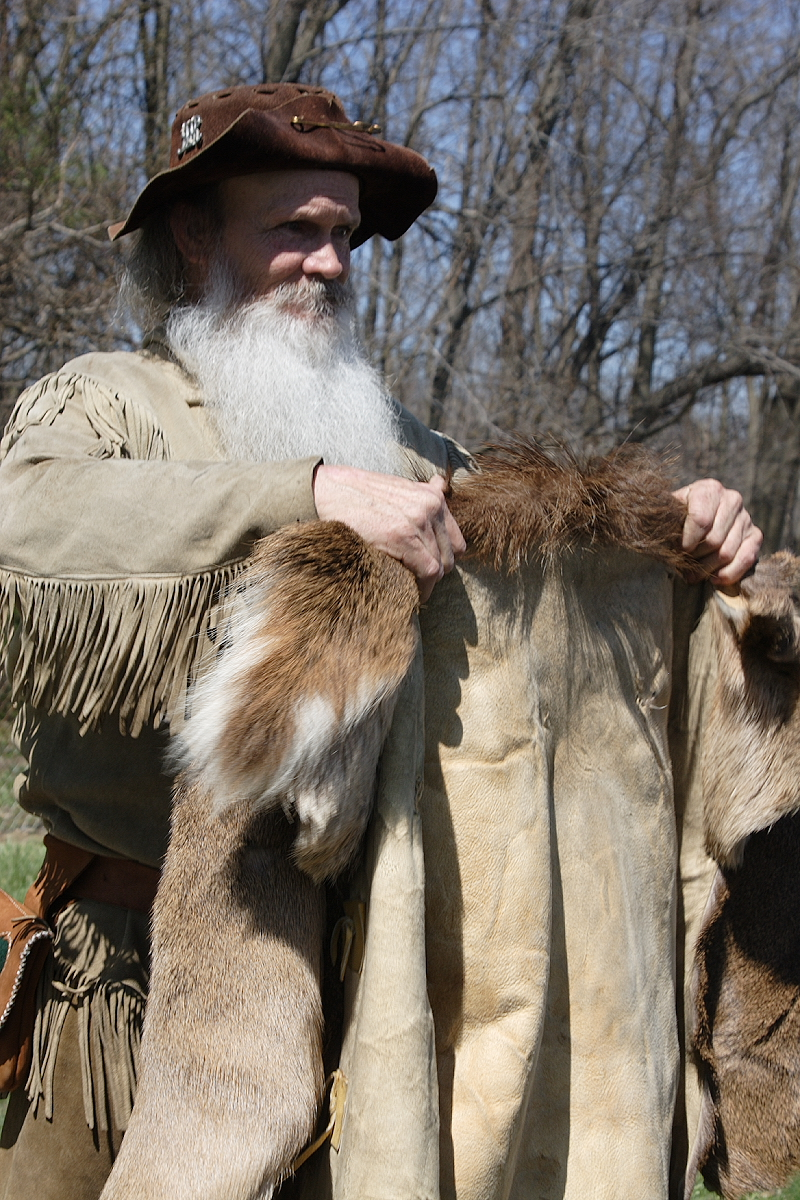
Mountain man reenactor or living historian dressed in buckskins

== Notable mountain men ==
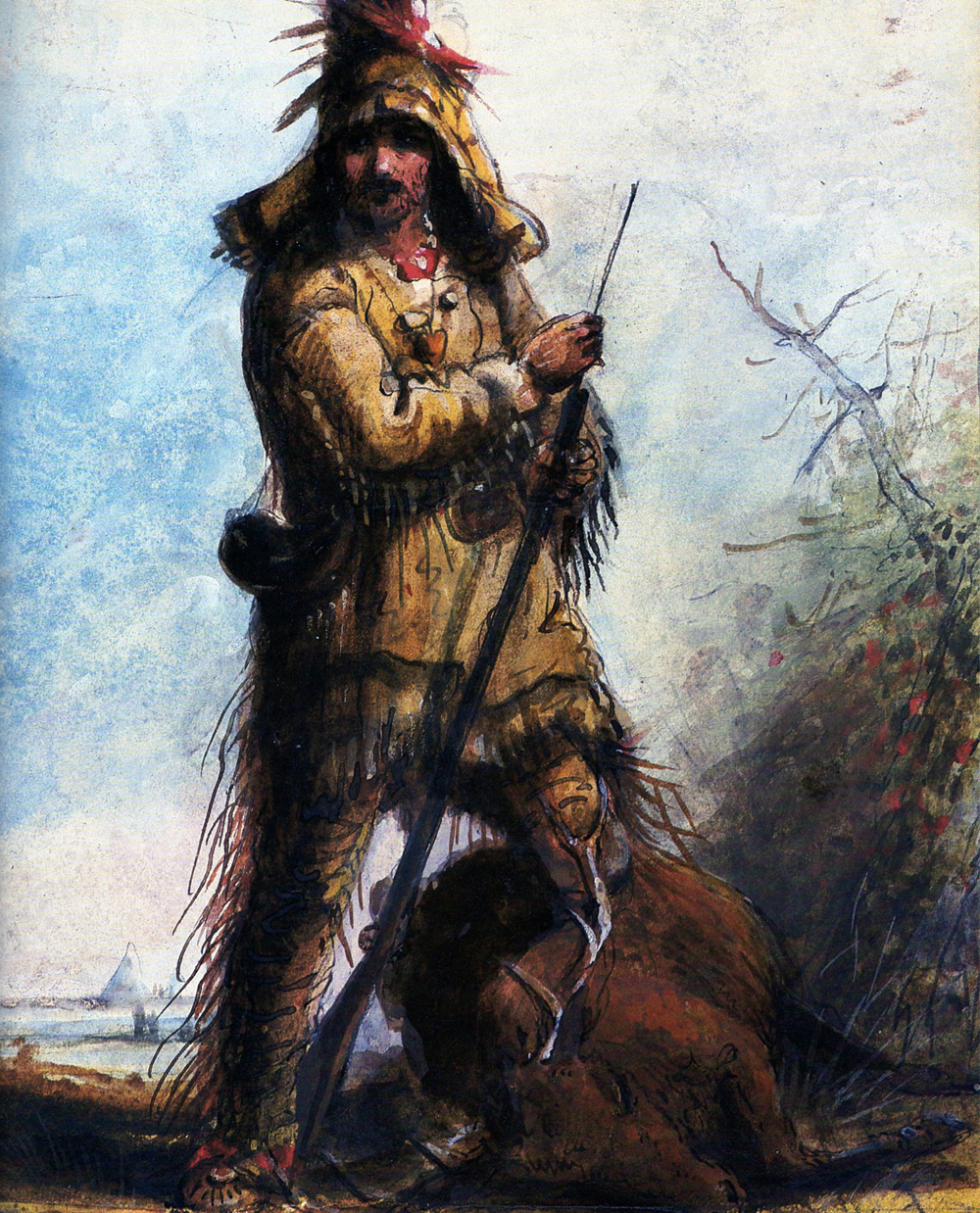
Rocky Mountains Trapper (supposedly) William "Old Bill" Williams

- Jim Beckwourth (1798–1866) was born into slavery, arrived in Missouri with his parents and was freed by his father. He started working with the Ashley expedition, signed on with the Rocky Mountain Fur Company, and became a well-known mountain man. He lived with the Crow for years and became a war chief. He was the only African American in the West to have his life story published (1856). He was credited with the discovery of Beckwourth Pass in the Sierra Nevada in 1850 and improved a Native American path creating what became known as the Beckwourth Trail through the mountains to Marysville, California.
- Jim Bridger (1804–1881) went west in 1822 at age 17 as a member of Ashley's Hundred exploring the Upper Missouri River area. He was among the first non-natives to see the geysers and other natural wonders of the Yellowstone region. He is also considered one of the first men of European descent, along with Étienne Provost, to see the Great Salt Lake, which because of its salinity, he first believed was an arm of the Pacific Ocean. In 1830, Bridger purchased shares in the Rocky Mountain Fur Company. He established Fort Bridger in southwestern Wyoming and was well known as a teller of tall tales. Fort Bridger later figured in the history of the Donner Party.
- Francis Buzzacott (1861-1947), American hunter, trapper and explorer who wrote Buzzacott's Masterpiece.
- Kit Carson (1809–1868) achieved notability for his later exploits, but he got his start and gained some early recognition as a trapper. Carson explored the west to California and north through the Rocky Mountains. He lived among and married into the Arapaho and Cheyenne tribes. He was hired by John C. Frémont ("the Pathfinder") as a guide and led him through much of California, Oregon, and the Great Basin area, and achieved national fame through Fremont. Stories of his life as a mountain man turned him into a frontier hero-figure, the prototypical mountain man of his time.
- Mansel Carter (1902–1987), a.k.a. "Man of the Mountain" was a businessman and gold prospector. In 1987, Phoenix Magazine named him one of "Arizona Legends". His gravesite in the Gold Mountain of the San Tan Mountain Regional Park in Queen Creek, Arizona, is a tourist attraction.
- John Colter (1774–1812 or 1813), one of the first mountain men, was a member of the Lewis and Clark Expedition. He later became the first European man to enter Yellowstone National Park and to see what is now Jackson Hole and the Teton Mountain Range. His description of the geothermal activity there seemed so outrageous to some that the area was mockingly referred to as Colter's Hell. Colter's narrow escape following capture by Blackfeet, leaving him naked and alone in the wilderness, became a legend known as "Colter's Run".
- George Drouillard (1774 or 1775–1810) was a hunter, interpreter, and sign-talker on the Lewis and Clark Expedition, often considered one of Lewis' two most appreciated members (with John Colter). Born to a French Canadian father and a Shawnee mother in Detroit, Drouillard proved to be the most skillful hunter on the expedition, notably during the harsh wintering in Fort Clatsop. He went on trapping in today's Wyoming and Montana after the expedition, working for Manuel Lisa's Missouri Fur Company, where he had signed on in 1807. Often venturing out alone like John Colter, notably to the headwaters of the Big Horn River from the Yellowstone and around the Three Forks of the Missouri, Drouillard was killed in May 1810 by Blackfoot Indians in the Three Forks area.
- Hugh Glass (1783–1833) was a frontiersman & fur trapper best known for his survival from a grizzly bear attack near the Missouri River. The films Man in the Wilderness (1971) and The Revenant (2015) are fictionalized versions of Glass and the grizzly bear episode.
- Sylvan "Buckskin Bill" Hart (1906–1980), known as the "Last of the Mountain Men", lived along the Salmon River in the Frank Church River of No Return Wilderness in Idaho from 1932 to 1980.
- John "Liver-Eating" Johnson (1824–1900) was one of the more notable latter-day mountain men. Johnson worked in Wyoming and Montana, trapping for beaver, buffalo, and wolf hides. Unaffiliated with a company, Johnson bargained independently to sell his hides. Elements of his story were portrayed in the film Jeremiah Johnson, and Dennis McLelland wrote a biography about him.
- Seth Kinman (1815–1888) was a legendary frontiersman best known for his settlement in California
- Joseph Meek (1810–1875) was a trapper, law enforcement official, and politician in the Oregon Country and later Oregon Territory. A pioneer involved in the fur trade before settling in the Tualatin Valley, Meek played a prominent role at the Champoeg Meetings of 1843, where he was elected as a sheriff. Later he served in the Provisional Legislature of Oregon before being selected as the United States Marshal for the Oregon Territory.
- Jedediah Smith (1799–1831) was a hunter, trapper, and fur trader whose explorations were significant in opening the American West to settlement by Europeans and Americans. Smith is considered the first man of European descent to cross the future state of Nevada; the first to traverse Utah from north to south and from west to east; and the first American to enter California by an overland route. He was also first to scale the High Sierra and explore the area from San Diego to the banks of the Columbia River. He was a successful businessman and a full partner in the Rocky Mountain Fur Company after Ashley's departure. Smith had notable facial scarring from a grizzly bear attack.
- William Sublette (1798–1845) was a fur trapper, pioneer, and mountain man who, with his brothers after 1823, became an agent of the Rocky Mountain Fur Company (and later one of its owners), exploiting the riches of the Oregon Country, which helped settle the best routes later improved into the Oregon Trail.
- Old Bill Williams (1787–1849) was a frontiersman & furtrapper best known for his expeditions to the American west & as an interpreter for the U.S. government

== See also ==
- Fort Laramie
- James "Grizzly" Adams
- Overmountain Men
- James Ohio Pattie
- Scottish Indian trade
- Coureur des bois
- Voyageurs
- Bandeirantes
- Promyshlenniki
