= Buckskin =

Buckskin(s) may refer to:

== Entertainment ==
- Buckskin, a feature documentary about Aboriginal Australian language and culture teacher Jack Buckskin
- Buckskin (film), a 1968 Western film
- Buckskin (TV series), an American Western television series

== Horses ==
- Buckskin (color), a body color of horses similar to buckskin leather, the animals also have a black mane and tail
- Buckskin (racehorse), an individual horse

== Leather ==
- Buckskin (leather), leather made of buck (i.e. deer) hide
- Buckskins, an outfit of buckskin leather

== People ==
- Buckskin Bill Black (1929–2018), American children's television personality
- Buckskin Frank Leslie (born 1842), American con-man
- Jack Buckskin (born c.1986), Aboriginal Australian cultural advisor and linguist in South Australia

== Places ==
- Buckskin, Indiana
- Buckskin Mountains (Arizona) of Arizona
- Buckskin Mountains (Arizona-Utah), on the Arizona-Utah border

== Other uses ==
- Buckskinning, a branch of historical re-enactment concentrating on the fur trade period of the Old West community in the United States

== See also ==
- Buckskin Gulch, a canyon and gulch in Utah, U.S.
- Buckskin Joe, a theme park used as a western movie set between 1957 and 2010
