= Buzacott =

Buzacott is a surname. Notable people with the surname include:

- Aaron Buzacott (1800–1864), missionary
- Charles Hardie Buzacott (1835–1918), Australian journalist
- Francis Henry Buzzacott (1861–1947), American frontiersman and writer
- Richard Buzacott (1867–1934), Australian politician

== See also ==
- Kevin Buzzacott (born 1947), Aboriginal elder
