= Rendezvous (fur trade) =

In North American history, a rendezvous was a larger meeting held typically once per year in the wilderness. All types included a major transfer of furs and goods to be traded for furs. Variations included a mix of other types of trading, business transactions, business meetings, and revelry.

== History ==
Rendezvous for the rocky mountain fur trade started in 1825 and would happen once every year until 1840, when the last rendezvous occurred. The first rendezvous occurred on July 1, 1825, and was put together by William H. Ashley when he headed into southwestern Wyoming with a supply train so that he could exchange his goods with the mountain men for their furs. The 1840 Green River rendezvous was the last rendezvous of the mountain men era, and this is due to the decline in beaver pelts and mountain men.

== In canoe-based fur trade areas ==
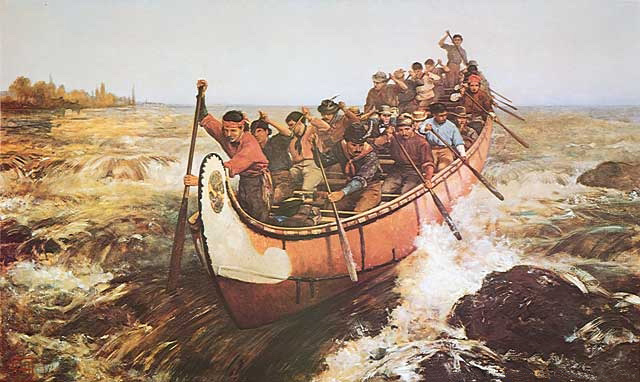
Shooting the Rapids, 1871 by Frances Anne Hopkins (1838–1919)

One type of rendezvous is associated with the voyageur and canoe-based fur trade business which was largely in Canada during the times of the year when the waterways were not frozen, and provided opportunities for new friends and foes. These were generally at a transportation transfer point on a wilderness route that could not be traversed in one season run by and including the fur trade of only a single company. The transfer was the dominant reason for holding the rendezvous although they included other meetings and revelry.

== In the western part of what is now the United States ==
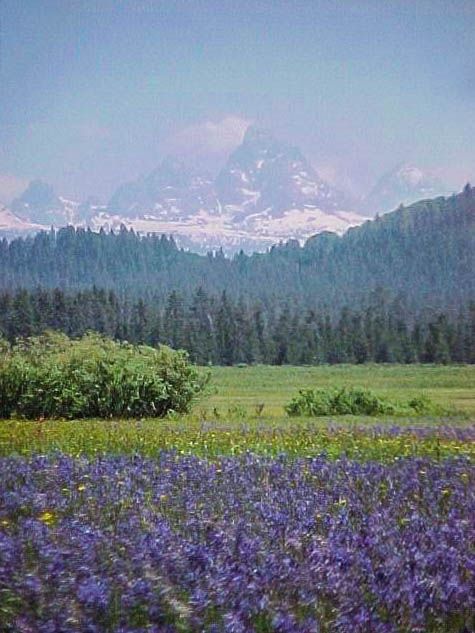
View of the Teton Range from the west, Teton Basin, Idaho, area where some of the larger mountain rendezvous were held

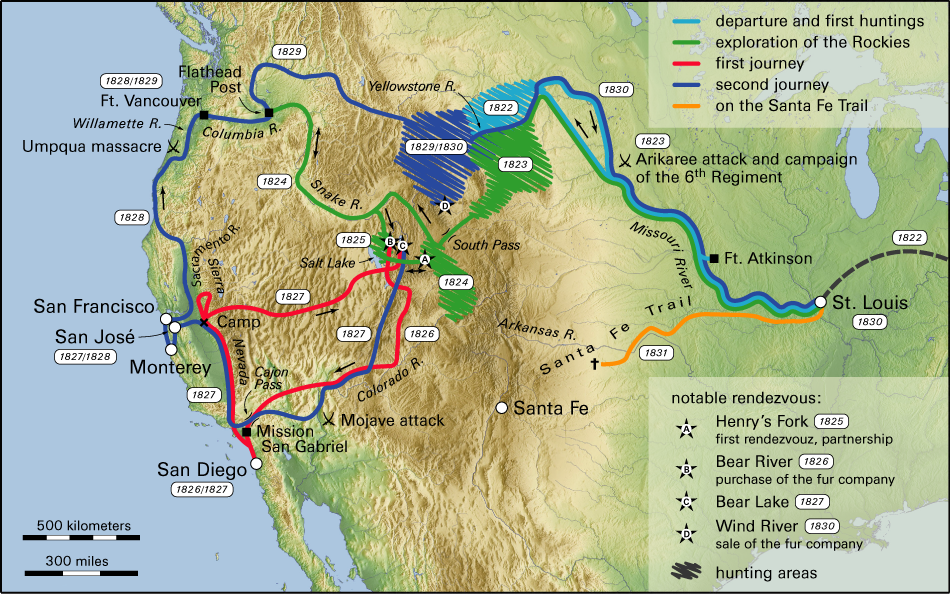

Rendezvous held in the western part of what is now the United States included a more diverse range of activities than their northern counterparts. Such a rendezvous might include several fur trading companies, and array of fur traders and mountain men. However, the majority of participants were Native American. A substantial amount of deal-making and trading occurred at these rendezvous. These were often a temporary "town" of sorts with businesses which offered the fur trade workers and participants ways to spend their money on supplies and revelry. The emblematic type was a large annual rendezvous held in the Rocky mountains from 1825 until 1840. One of the largest of these was the rendezvous of 1832. Much of the attendance of these consisted of mountain men who were fur trade participants who were experienced at living in the mountain back country.

The syndicated television anthology series Death Valley Days offered a 1958 episode, "The Big Rendezvous", about the 1825 gathering. Peter Walker (born 1927) was cast as the historical Kit Carson, Gardner McKay as the villainous Pierre Shunar, and Iron Eyes Cody as a trapper. Laurie Carroll (born 1933) was cast as the young Indian woman, Waa-Nibe, for whom Carson is smitten. The 1980 Western The Mountain Men (1980), starring Charlton Heston and Brian Keith, featured the rendezvous of 1838 and 1839.

== Modern rendezvous ==
Historical fur trade rendezvous are the basis or inspiration for rendezvous that are held today. Some of these (such as those held by buckskinners) are historical re-enactments to varying degrees; others are not reenactments but are inspired by elements of historical rendezvous.

== See also ==
- Canadian canoe routes
- North American fur trade
