= Gunnar Kangro =

Estonian mathematician

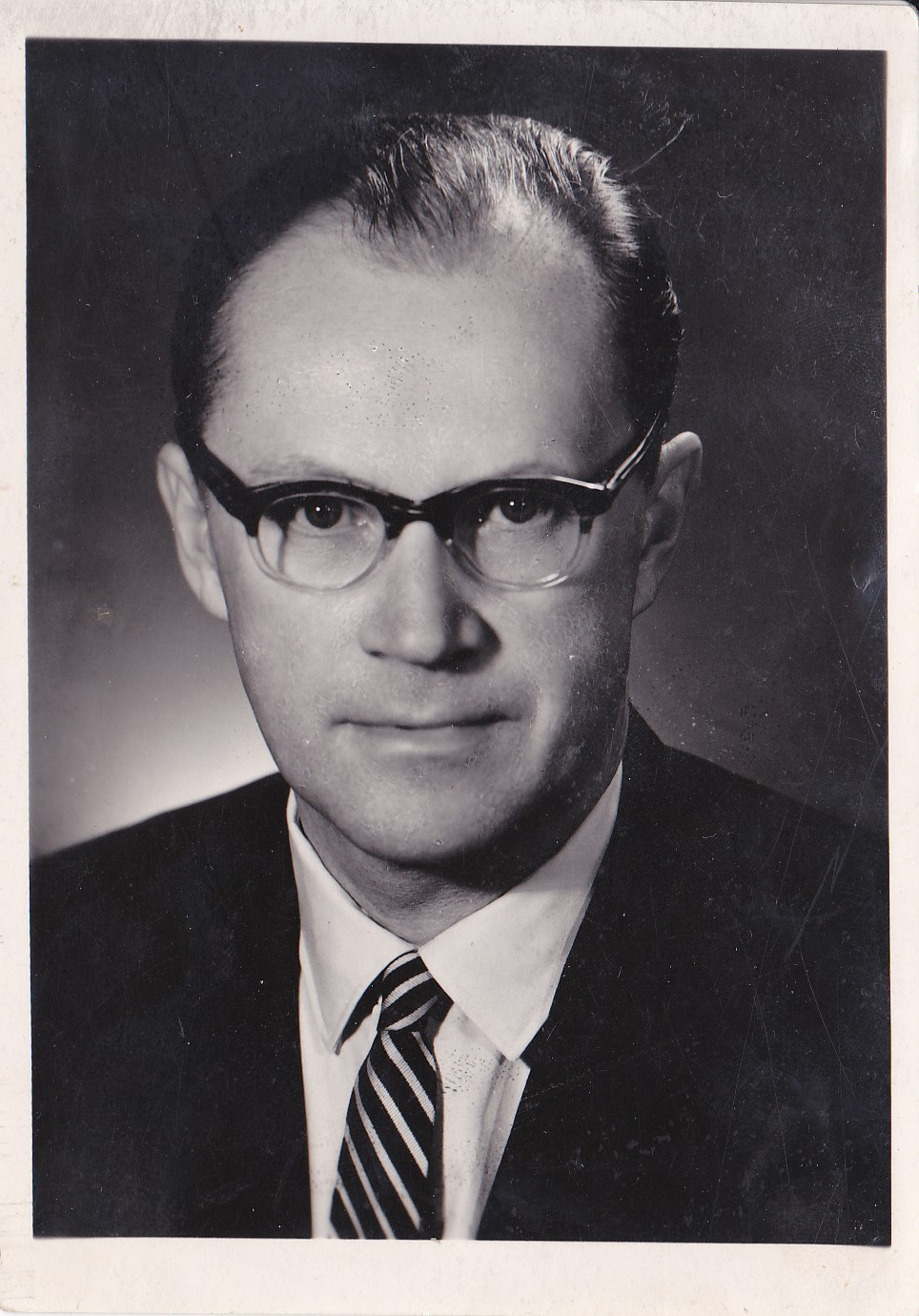
Gunnar Kangro

Gunnar Kangro (November 21, 1913 – December 25, 1975, Tartu) was an Estonian mathematician. He worked mainly on summation theory. He taught various courses on mathematical analysis, functional analysis and algebra in the University of Tartu and he has written several university textbooks.

== Biography ==
Gunnar Kangro was born on November 21, 1913, in Tartu as the third and youngest child of a construction engineer and a building contractor. After graduating from Tartu Secondary Science School (Tartu Reaalgümnaasium) in 1931 he was admitted to the Faculty of Mathematics and Natural Sciences of Tartu University to study mathematics. After graduating from the university in 1935 and finishing the compulsory service in Estonian Defence Forces he was appointed as junior assistant in the Laboratory of Mathematics and Mechanics in Tallinn Technical Institute (currently Tallinn University of Technology). He defended his Master's thesis in 1938 under the supervision of professor Hermann Jaakson in Tartu University. In 1940 he got a scholarship for doctoral studies from Tartu University.

In July 1941, Kangro was drafted to the Red Army. He served until February 1942, when he was sent to Chelyabinsk Agricultural Mechanisation Institute. At the end of 1943, he was transferred to Moscow University, where he continued his research towards a Doctor's degree.

Kangro returned to Estonia in autumn 1944, and from November onwards he started teaching at Tartu University. In 1947–48 he was the dean of the Faculty of Physics and Mathematics. He defended his Doctoral thesis in July 1947 and became a professor in 1951. In 1952–1959 he was the head of the Chair of Geometry, from 1959 until his death in 1975 he was the head of the Chair of Mathematical Analysis.

== Research ==
In his Doctoral thesis he created a new theory of convergence, which generalized Borel theory of summation, and applied this to study problems connected to convergence of complex power series. He defined new summation methods and used them to characterize properties of the sum of power series and its analytic continuation. The star-shaped summability domains of power series obtained by these new summation methods enabled him to get results extending the applications of Borel summation methods in function theory.

In the 1950s, he laid the basis on systematic treatment of summability factors together with German mathematicians Alexander Peyerimhoff and Wolfgang Jurkat. He combined ideas of modern functional analysis with classical analysis. Together with his student Simson Baron he started to describe the summability factors for double series.

Considering applications to orthogonal series and Tauberian theorems, Kangro created a theory of summability with speed based on functional analysis, which helped him to solve several problems in function and summability theory. In addition to laying the basis for the new theory he also pointed out main directions for applications. This work was interrupted by his unexpected death in 1975.

== Teaching ==
After the war Kangro had a great influence on modernizing the teaching of mathematics in Tartu State University. His courses on algebra and mathematical analysis reflected the changes taking place in these areas in the first half of the 20th century: function theory of polynomials was replaced by abstract algebra, mathematical analysis was based on axiomatic methods and set theory. His course on functional analysis became a starting point for a new research direction in numerical methods in Tartu.

Kangro's main contribution was raising a new generation of mathematicians. He has supervised 23 Candidate's theses in mathematics. In addition to mathematical analysis he has also contributed to development of algebra, numerical methods and geometry in Estonia. Notable is his initiative in reorganization of mathematical higher education in University of Tartu in the 1960s in connection with increased need for computer experts.

== Honors ==
- 1961 member of Academy of Sciences of the Estonian SSR (now Estonian Academy of Sciences)
- 1965 Merited Scientist of the Estonian SSR

== Books ==
- 1948 Kõrgem algebra I, Teaduslik kirjastus, Tartu
- 1950 Kõrgem algebra II, Eesti Riiklik Kirjastus, Tallinn-Tartu
- 1962 Kõrgem algebra, Eesti Riiklik Kirjastus, Tallinn
- 1965 Matemaatiline analüüs I, Eesti Raamat, Tallinn
- 1968 Matemaatiline analüüs II, Valgus, Tallinn

== Publications ==
- Verallgemeinerte Theorie der absoluten Summierbarkeit. Tartu Ülikooli Toimetised, seeria A, 37 (1942).
- Theory of summability of sequences and series. Journal of Soviet Mathematics, 5, 1–45 (1976).
