= Vincent Patriarca =

Italian American aviator

- Vincenzo Joseph Patriarca
- Born: Vincent Joseph Patriarca; 1914; New York, United States
- Died: 1995 (aged 80–81); Naples, Italy
- Military career
- Allegiance: Italy; Spain
- Branch: Regia Aeronautica
- Rank: Maresciallo
- Nickname: Vincenzo Boccolari
- Units: Aviazione Legionaria; 356a Squadriglia, 21o Gruppo
- Conflicts: Second Italo-Ethiopian War; Spanish Civil War; Italian military intervention in Spain (POW); World War II; Bombing of Naples

Vincent Joseph Patriarca, later known as Maresciallo Vincenzo Joseph Patriarca, was an Italian American notable for being one of the few United States citizens to fight for Franco's Nationalists during the Spanish Civil War, rather than in the Republican International Brigades such as the Abraham Lincoln Brigade.

== Early life ==
Vincent Patriarca was born in New York to Italian immigrant parents and became a naturalized citizen.

He developed a passion for flying at a young age, and in 1931 at 17 years old gathered up all his money and went to Long Island Airport for instruction, gaining 20 hours solo to his credit. Before he could take his pilot license test the regulations were changed from a required 20 hours to a required 25 hours.

== Italian service and Spanish Civil War ==
Out of money and learning that sons of Italian diaspora would receive free training in Italian Air Schools in a bid to bring Italians back to Fascist Italy, he traveled to Rome to take advantage of the offer and start his training. There he met Ernesto Monica, becoming fast friends and getting into trouble performing stunts together.

Upon hearing of Italy's plans to invade Ethiopia, Patriarca was initially uninterested given his American nationality. However, eager for action, he later volunteered to fly in the Second Italo-Ethiopian War. Largely suffering from heat illness, the only combat he saw was on December 25, 1935, when he suppressed an Ethiopian anti-aircraft gun concealed in a tree by strafing it with his machine guns.

In August 1936, Patriarca volunteered and was among the first 12 Regia Aeronautica transported to Morocco and then Spain, along with 12 Fiat CR.32 biplanes, to fly for Franco's forces.

On September 11, 1936, Patriarca along with two other CR.32 pilots intercepted Republican Nieuport Ni-H.52. Each Italian pilot scored a kill, with Patriarca shooting down the Ni-H.52 piloted by Britain volunteer Brian Griffin from Escuadrilla Internacional, who was killed, after a brief dogfight. Patriarca claimed to be unable to sleep that night, not knowing whether he had killed Griffin. In time news came to him that Ernesto Monica had been shot down by Republican Felix Urtubi Ercilla, and told that Monica was tortured by Republican women before being dismembered by horses.

Patriarca became intent on revenge, and on September 13 while on a patrol with two other CR.32 pilots, Patriarca noticed Vickers Vildebeest being escorted by a pair of Ni-H.52s. Despite being signaled by his Captain to let them go, Patriarca flew to intercept and was joined by the other CR.32 pilots. The Vildebeests managed to escape, however Italian pilot GianLino Baschirotto shot down a Ni-H.52 that was actually piloted by Felix Urtubi. Patriarca, believing the other Ni-H.52 was piloted by Urtubi, collided with it after a dogfight where he had landed shots to set it on fire. The Republican pilot, Carlos Colom Moliner, was killed, whereas Patriarca managed to parachute behind Republican lines, where he was captured, saved from summary execution only by showing his American passport. He was imprisoned and faced possible execution, but was released under pressure from the US State Department, and returned to America in November 1936.

== Later service ==
Having no pilot's license in the United States, Patriarca returned to Italy and re-joined the Regia Aeronautica, where he attained the rank of Marshal.

In November 1940 he became part of 356th Squadron, flying a Fiat CR.42. During the night between the 5th and 6th of December 1940, 20 British Wellington bombers attacked the Royal Arsenal in Naples. Marshal Patriarca took off from Capodichino airfield to intercept the bombers. He spotted Wellington R1066 of No. 40 Squadron piloted by D. F. Hutt, and engaged it, firing 408 rounds before finally shooting it down. Hutt and second pilot I. E. Miller managed to bale out and became POWs.

After WWII, Patriarca continued his service in the Italian Air Force, piloting Vampires during the 1950s. He died in Naples during Christmas of 1995.
