= Buckskinning =

Historical re-enactment concentrating on the fur trade

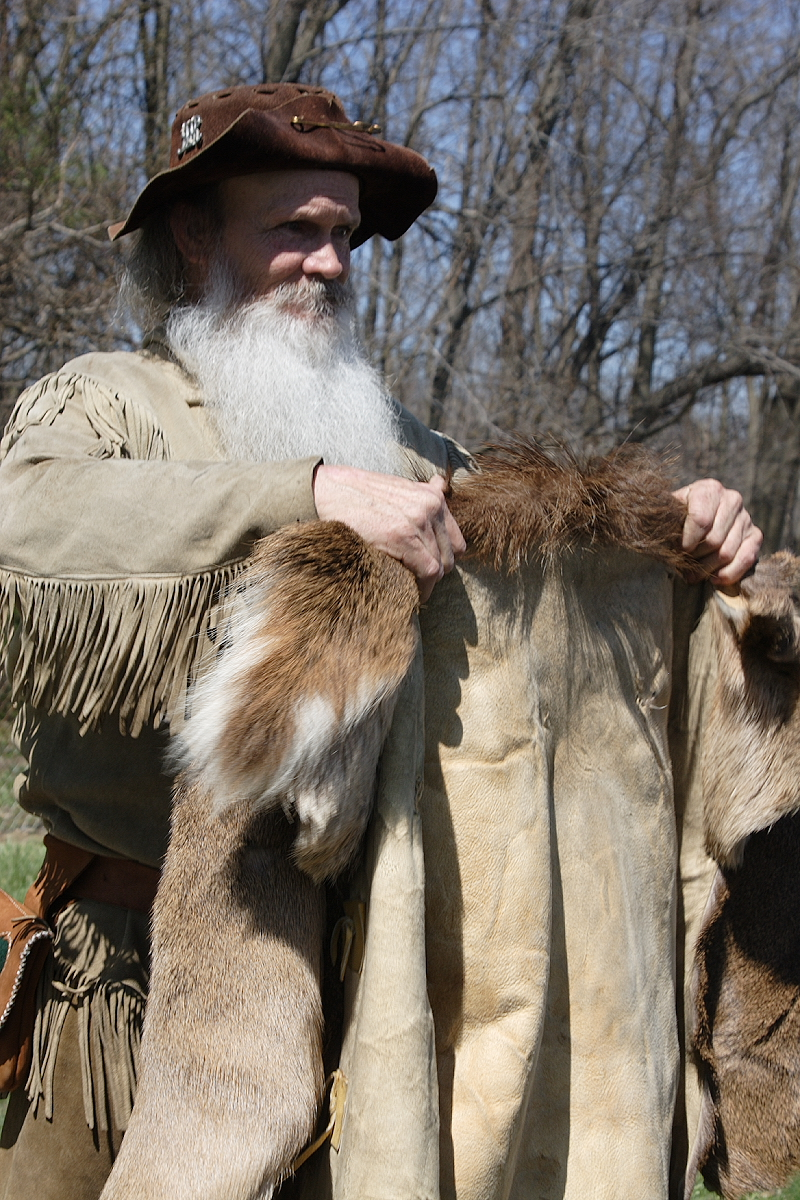
Mountain man reenactor dressed in buckskins

Buckskinning is a branch of historical reenactment concentrating on the fur trade with different areas in the period of the Old West (approximately dated between 1800 and 1840). Participants may choose to portray mountain men, American Indians, traders, missionaries, or anybody else who might have been in the Rocky Mountains between 1800 and 1840.

Buckskinning grew out of the increased interest in gunpowder and muzzleloader firearms in the last decades of the 20th century. Many buckskinners also participate in other historical reenactment groups, particularly those involving antique and replica firearms, such as American Civil War and Revolutionary War reenactments.

Buckskinners' gatherings are called rendezvous after the large "Rendezvous" held during the years when beaver fur hats were the height of fashion, and beaver pelts commanded high prices. At a rendezvous, everybody is expected to dress in styles appropriate to the period, as far as possible, and authenticity in all things is encouraged, consistent with health and modern law. There are competitions in marksmanship with muzzle-loading firearms, bows, tomahawks and knife throwing, demonstrations of period skills, and commerce in goods related to the hobby.
