= Francis Buzzacott =

American explorer, hunter, inventor and soldier (1861–1947)

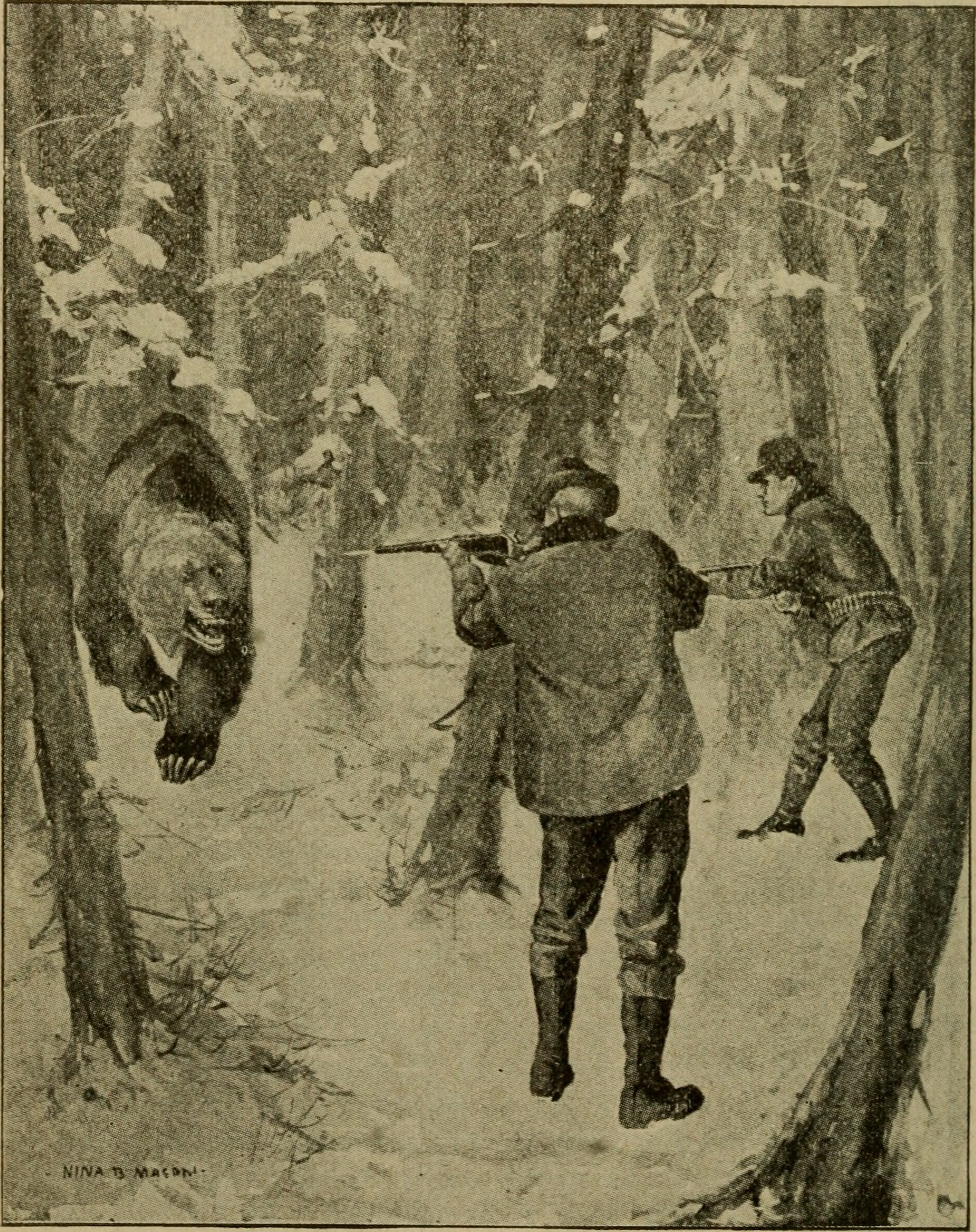
- Illustration of Buzzacott hunting grizzly bear, from his eponymous Masterpiece.
- Born: Francis H Buzzacott; December 25, 1861; Swansea, Wales
- Died: 16 March 1947 (aged 85); Lake City, Florida, US
- Military career
- Allegiance: United States
- Branch: United States Army
- Service years: 1879 (British Army), 1885-98 (US Army)
- Rank: Colonel
- Conflicts: Zulu War; Indian Wars; Spanish–American War; Philippine–American War

Francis Henry Buzzacott (1861–1947) was an American hunter, conservationist, army scout, and explorer famous for writing the Hunter's and Trapper's Complete Guide and the Complete American and Canadian Sportsman's Encyclopedia, better known today as Buzzacott's Masterpiece.

== Early life ==
Francis Buzzacott was born on Christmas Day 1861 in Swansea, Wales to Welsh parents, Henry Buzzacott (1833–99) and Eliza Turner (born 1838). His father, Henry Buzzacott, also worked as a hunter and trapper after the Civil War and assisted Francis in drafting his Masterpiece. Henry later returned to Swansea, where he died in 1899. His mother emigrated to the United States in 1900, joining her son Francis, who was living in Chicago at that time.

== Career ==
When he was 16 years old, Francis Buzzacott ran away from home and signed on as an apprentice aboard a Welsh collier of the Richardson Shipping Line. Upon arrival at Capetown, South Africa, Buzzacott jumped ship and attempted to enlist in the British Army's South African Expedition during the Zulu War, but was turned down due to his age. Undeterred, he signed up as a mess boy for Lieutenant Colonel Sir Baker Creed Russell. After the disaster at the Battle of Isandlwana, for which he was fortunately not present, he deserted his regiment but was later arrested in Capetown. Released due to his age, he was briefly employed in a gold mine in Kimberly before he took ship to Australia. After several months at sea, he finally landed in the United States on 20 December 1878 in the port of New York. In between expeditions, he found employment as a seal hunter in Canada, sailor on a whaleboat, and commercial fisherman. He was a prolific inventor, designing and patenting a number of devices, including stoves for the Army, rolling field kitchens, camping equipment, and compact travel kits. Later in life he became interested in human sexuality, and published a scientific study of bisexuality and human hermaphrodites in 1914. During the 1920s he invented the "Thought Indicator" (US pat.39783), a precursor to the Brain–computer interface adapted from a wireless radio.

== Expeditions ==
Throughout his lifetime, he amassed over 40 years' experience as an explorer, outdoorsman, trapper, and guide. Buzzacott participated in many expeditions during the late Victorian era between 1879 and 1912. These included the Jeannette expedition of 1879–81, Lady Franklin Bay Expedition of 1881–84, and the Walter Wellman Polar Expedition of 1906. He was also a member of the American Geological Society, National Rifle Association of America, and the National Geographic Association.

== Military service ==
In 1886, he enlisted in the U.S. 5th Cavalry Regiment for five years, serving in Indian Territory (present-day state of Oklahoma), where he patrolled along the Texas Border in search of Native American renegades and took part in the Pine Ridge campaign against the Ghost Dancers that culminated in the Battle of Wounded Knee. After that 5-year enlistment expired, he immediately reenlisted in 1891 for another 5-year period, this time with the U.S. 15th Infantry Regiment at Ft. Sheridan, Illinois. After two and a half years, he secured an early release from the Army and settled in Chicago, Illinois. In the autumn of 1893, he joined Company A, 3rd Illinois Militia, which was mobilized on 8 May 1898 as the 3rd Regiment, Illinois Volunteers for service in the Spanish-American War. Landing at Ponce, Puerto Rico on 2 August 1898, now-Sergeant Buzzacott served as the commissary sergeant of the regiment. Though he did not experience any combat personally, he did improve his regiment's morale when he set up a Temperance Canteen in camp near Guayamo, Puerto Rico. After the 3rd Illinois Volunteers returned to the US in November 1898, along with the rest of the regiment he was demobilized and mustered out of service on 20 January 1899 with the rank of Sergeant. On 8 November 1898, he testified at the embalmed beef scandal. He became a supporter of the temperance movement after witnessing the effects of excessive alcohol consumption on his fellow soldiers. During the 1890s while still an enlisted man he invented and patented the famous Buzzacott Cooking Outfit and a portable bread oven for the US Army, which was widely acclaimed as an improvement over existing field cooking stoves. Prior to World War I, he was involved with the early Boy Scout movement in America.

== Death ==
Buzzacott died in Lake City, Florida, in 1947 and was buried at the Palmetto Cemetery in Brunswick, Georgia. He was survived by his second wife Helen (or Ellen) Kidwell, who he had married on 9 August 1929 and two daughters Beatrice (1892–1979) and Tillie (1892–1980). A third daughter, Lillian (born 1894), had died in infancy.

== Publications ==
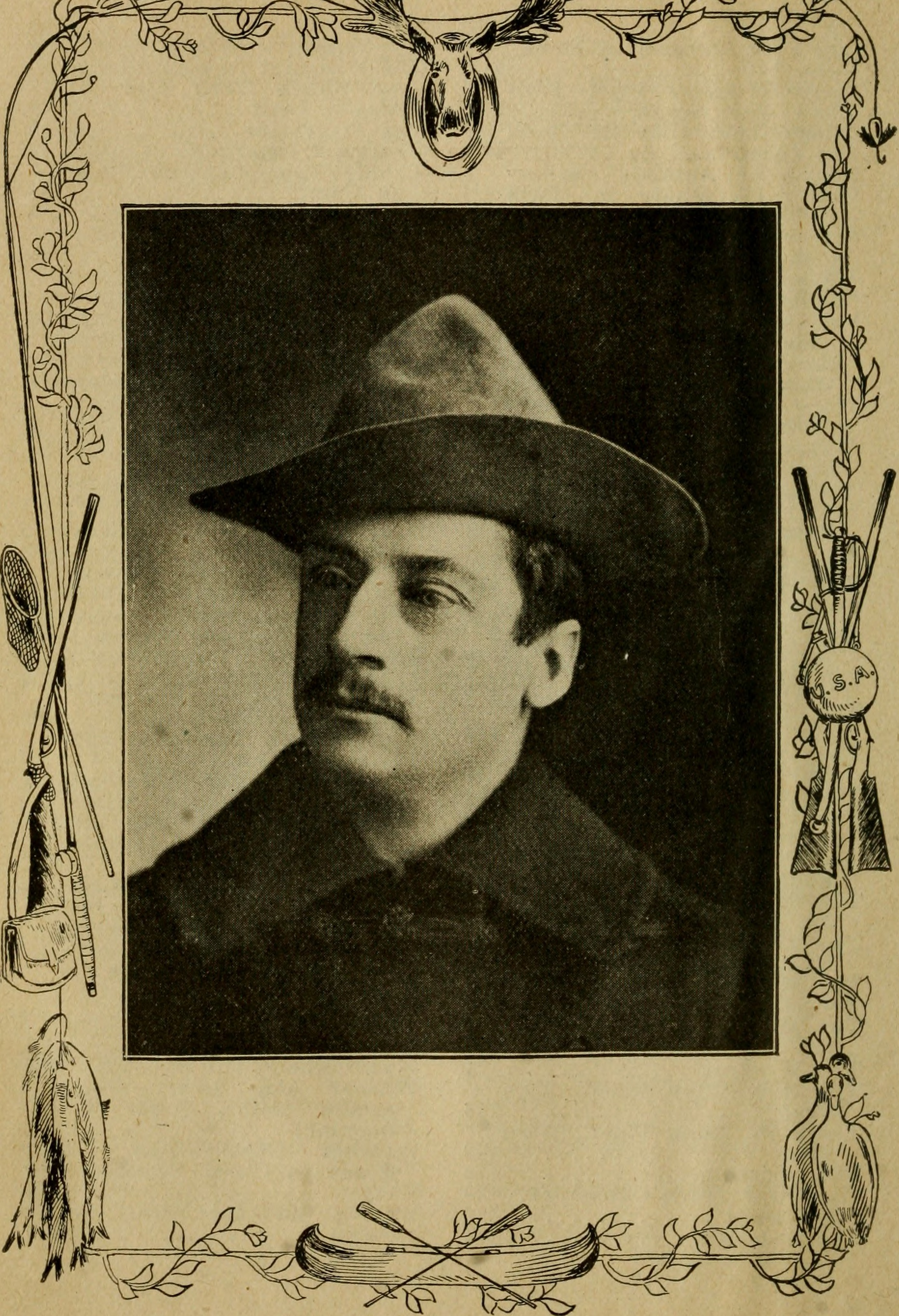
Book frontispiece from Buzzacott's Complete American and Canadian Sportsman's Encyclopedia of Valuable instruction, with photograph of the author in 1913.

- Hunter's and Trapper's Complete Guide, 1903
- Complete Fisherman's and Angler's Manual, 1903
- Complete American and Canadian Sportsman's Encyclopedia of Valuable instruction, 1905
- Totem Club Boys' Handbook, 1912
- Buzzacott's Masterpiece, 1913
- Mystery of the Sexes, 1913
- Bisexual Man, or Evolution of the Sexes, 1914
- Complete Sportsman's Guide, 1929 revision of his 1913 Masterpiece
- Lost Arts of the Sportsman, reprinted 2013
