= List of airlines of the Czech Republic =

This is a list of airlines in the Czech Republic (as of 2024).

== Scheduled airlines ==
Airline	Image	IATA	ICAO	Callsign	Founded	Type	Notes
Smartwings		QS	TVS	SKYTRAVEL	1997	scheduled/charter	Previously Travel Service

== Charter airlines ==
Airline	Image	IATA	ICAO	Callsign	Founded	Type	Notes
ABS Jets			ABP	BAIR	2004	aerotaxi	
Aerotaxi						aerotaxi	
Aeropartner			DFC	DARK BLUE		aerotaxi	
Air Bohemia			BOH	BOHEMIA		aerotaxi	
Air Prague			PRG	AIR PRAGUE		aerotaxi	
Airstream			AQS	AIRSTREAM		aerotaxi	
DSA					1993	medical service	
Eclair Aviation			ECC	ECLAIR		aerotaxi	
F-Air			FAP	FAIR SCHOOL		aerotaxi	
G-Jet			GSJ	GROSSJET	2004	aerotaxi	
HELI Czech			HCP	HELICOPTER		aerotaxi, helicopter	
JetBee Czech						aerotaxi	
LR Airlines			LRB	LADY RACINE		aerotaxi	
Silesia Air			SUA	AIR SILESIA	2002	aerotaxi	
Silver Air			SLD	SILVERLINE	1995	aerotaxi	schedules for third parties and aircraft leasing
Time Air			TIE	TIME AIR	2001	aerotaxi	
UG Jet			UGJ	UNIJET	2020	aerotaxi	
Van Air Europe		V9	VAA	EUROVAN	2004	aerotaxi	
Queen Air			QNR	QUEEN AIR		aerotaxi	

== Defunct airlines ==
Airline	Image	IATA	ICAO	Callsign	Founded	Defunct	Type	Notes
Czech Airlines		OK	CSA	CSA-LINES	1923	2024	scheduled	Former flag carrier. From 2024 a holding company of Smartwings.

== See also ==
- List of airlines
- List of defunct airlines of Czech Republic
- List of defunct airlines of Europe
