= List of defunct airlines of Czech Republic =

This is a list of defunct airlines of the Czech Republic.

Airline	Image	IATA	ICAO	Callsign	Commenced operations	Ceased operations	Notes
ABA Air			ABP	BAIR	1996	2004	Merged operations into ABS Jets
Air Moravia			MOA		1991	1997	Charter airline
Air Ostrava		8K	VTR		1995	2000	
Air Praha			PGU		1994	1995	Merged to form Georgia Air Prague
Air Terrex			TRX		1992	1995	Previously CMA-Central European Airlines
Bemoair			BMI		1991	1996	Merged operations into Egretta BMI
Blue Air Moravia					2017	2018	Not launched
Československá letecká společnost (CLS)					1927	1945	
Central Charter Airlines		3B	CCG	JOBAIR	2010	2011	Renamed as Czech Connect Airlines
Central Connect Airlines		3B	JBR		2005	2014	
Central European Airlines-CMA						1992	
Charter Air		8F	FFR	Fischer	2005	2005	Brand used for a short time by Fischer Air
Czech Airlines		OK	CSA	CSA-LINES	1923	2024	Transformed into a holding company
Czech Connect Airlines		CQ	CCG	CZECH CONNECT	2011	2012	Previously Central Charter Airlines
Discovery Link					2004	2005	
Egretta BMI			BMI		1997	1997	
Ensor Air		E9	ENR		1992	1994	
Espe Air					1991	1993	
Fischer Air		8F	FFR	Fischer	1997	2005	
Georgia Air Prague			PGU		1995	1997	
Holidays Czech Airlines		HC	HCC	CZECH HOLIDAYS	2010	2014	Czech Airlines subsidiary
IDG Technology Airlines					1997	1997	
Job Air	3B	JBR			2005	2005	Operations transferred to Central Connect Airlines
Mostarez Air				Air Brno	1995	1997	
OLIMEX			OLX		1993		
Škoda Air			SOA			1997	Renamed/merged to Skoda Engineering Air Transport
Skoda Engineering Air Transport			SOA		1979	1997	
Statni Letecky Utvar					1990	1998	Also known as CSG

== See also ==
- List of airlines of Czech Republic
- List of airports in Czech Republic
