= Hradec Králové Airport =

Hradec Kralove Airport Letiště Hradec Králové
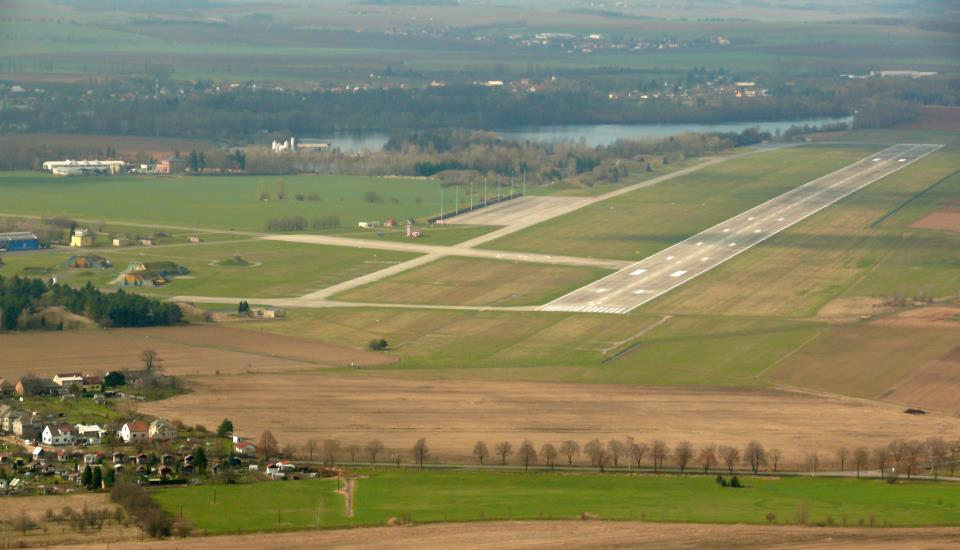
- IATA: none; ICAO: LKHK

Summary
- Airport type: Public
- Owner: Hradec Králové city
- Operator: Letecké služby Hradec Králové a.s.
- Serves: Hradec Králové
- Location: Hradec Králové
- Elevation AMSL: 791 ft / 241 m
- Coordinates: 50°15′20″N 15°50′43″E
- Website: https://lshk.cz

Map
- Location of airport in Czech Republic

Runways
Direction	Length		Surface
Direction	ft	m	Surface
33L/15R	2,625	800	Grass
33R/15L	7,874	2,400	Concrete

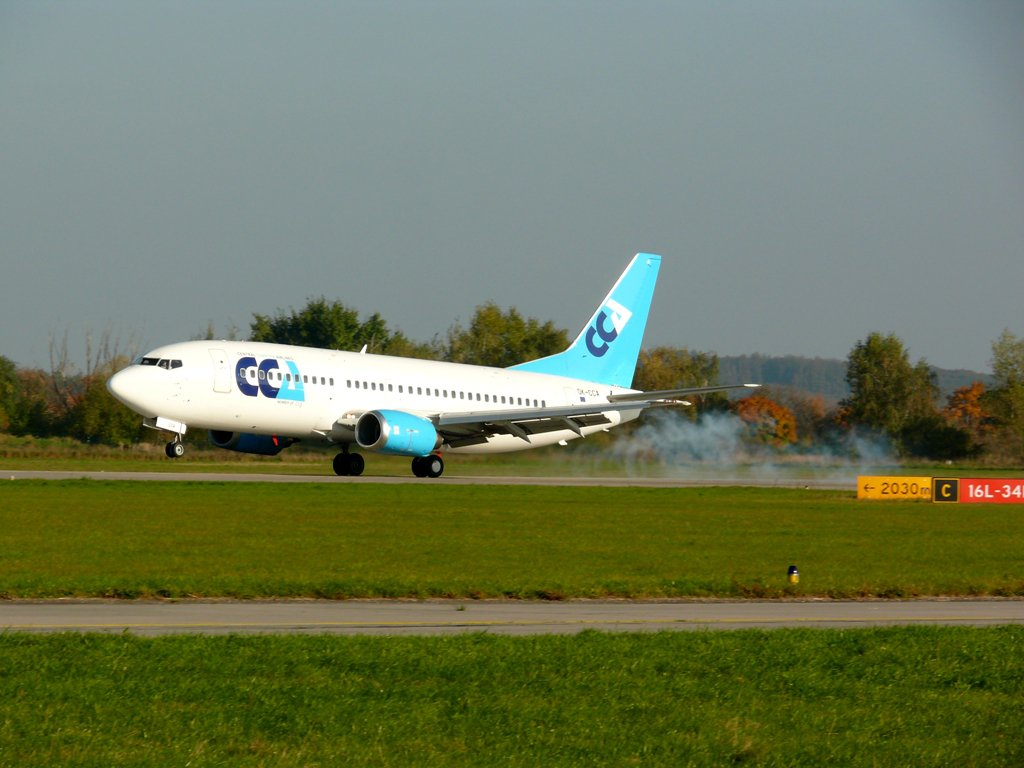
Base training od B737-300 at LKHK (2010) Czech Connect Airlines

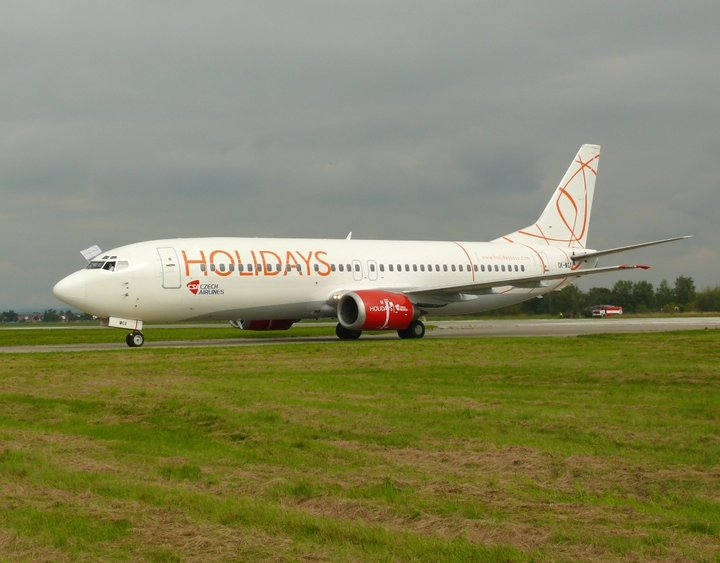
Boeing 737-400 CSA Holidays on LKHK

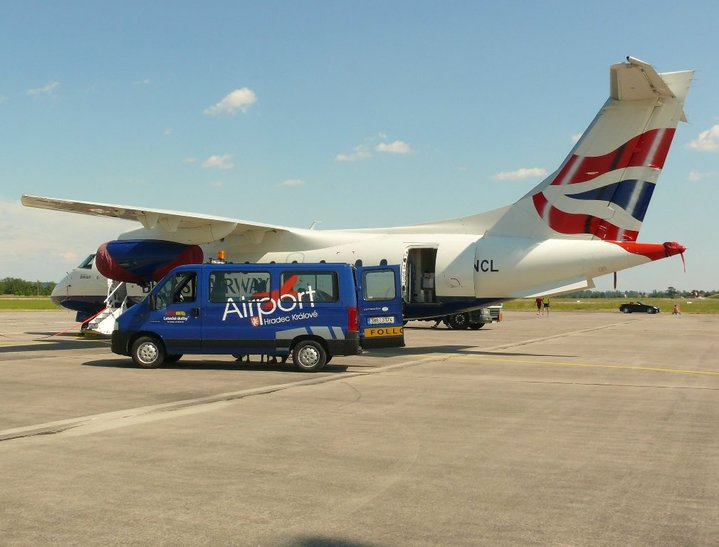
DO328 JET landed in Hradec Kralove with Muse band

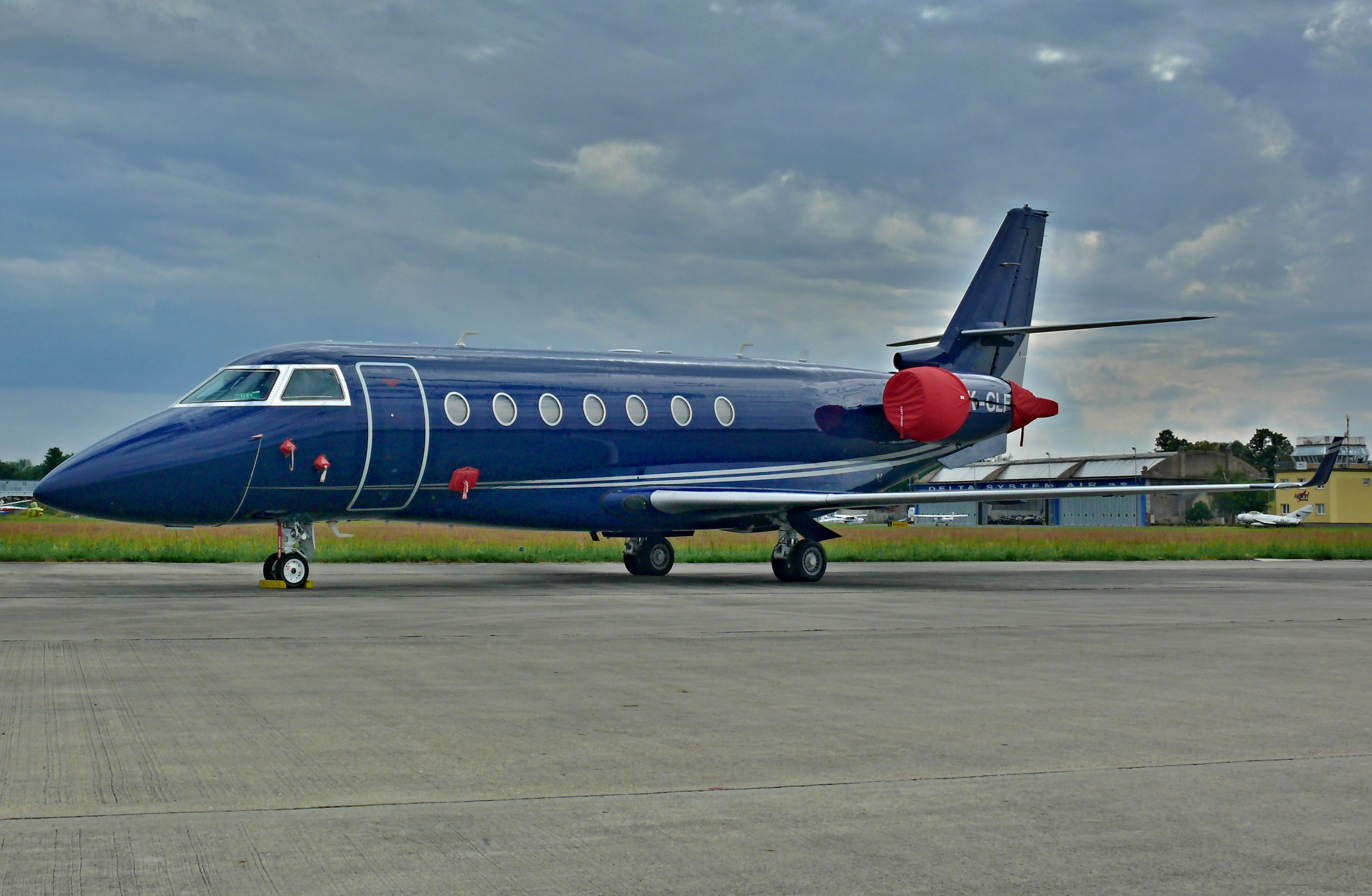
Czech Gulfstream G200 OK-GLF in Hradec Kralove

Hradec Králové Airport (Czech: Letiště Hradec Králové) is a public domestic and private international airport located about 3 km (1.9 mi) from Hradec Králové, in east Bohemia, Czech Republic in the town of Hradec Králové. There are currently no scheduled commercial flights operating to or from the airport.

In 2010, it was visited by a Boeing 737-300 of the former Czech airline Czech Connect Airlines on a VFR base training exercise.

For years the airport has hosted Open Skies for handicapped individuals in June and the Czech International Air Festival in September.

== Project IFR LKHK 2015 ==
The airport is in the process of obtaining certification for IFR AFIS with RNAV / GNSS non-precision approach.

== Statistics ==
In 2017, Airport Hradec Kralove had about 77 376 movements.

- ACFT – 72 763
- ACFT INTL – 785
- ULL – 4 614
- ULL INTL – 134

== Ground transportation ==
DPMHK, the Hradec Hradec Kralove Public Transit Co., operates a bus which has a stop at "Airport (Letiště)" Station that's a 10 minute walk from the private area of the airport

The airport is a few kilometers away from the highway (D11) to Prague.

- To Prague approx. 50 min.
- To Náchod approx. 45 min. (border crossing CZ-PL)
- To Deštné v Orlických horách approx. 70 min. (Ski resort, Orlické hory - Eagle Mountains)
- To Pec pod Sněžkou approx. 75 min. (Ski resort, Krkonoše - Giant Mountains)
- To Kvasiny approx. 50 min. (Škoda Auto a.s. factory)

== Events ==
- Czech International Air Festival
- Open Skies for Handicapped
- European Festival of Aviation (European Helicopter Show)
- The Rock for People and Hip Hop Camp festivals are held in the public area of the airport in the festival park.

== Information ==
- Fire category 2. CAT 3 - 7 on request 24hrs before.
- VFR day/night, fuelling: on request 24 hours in advance Avgas 100LL, Jet fuel-A1 (pressure and gravity)
- Flying schools operated from this airport: DSA a.s., HELI Czech s.r.o., Lion Helicopters s.r.o. etc.
- Aircraft and helicopter maintenance services are located here too.
- Aircraft manufacturer TL Ultralight

== Gallery ==
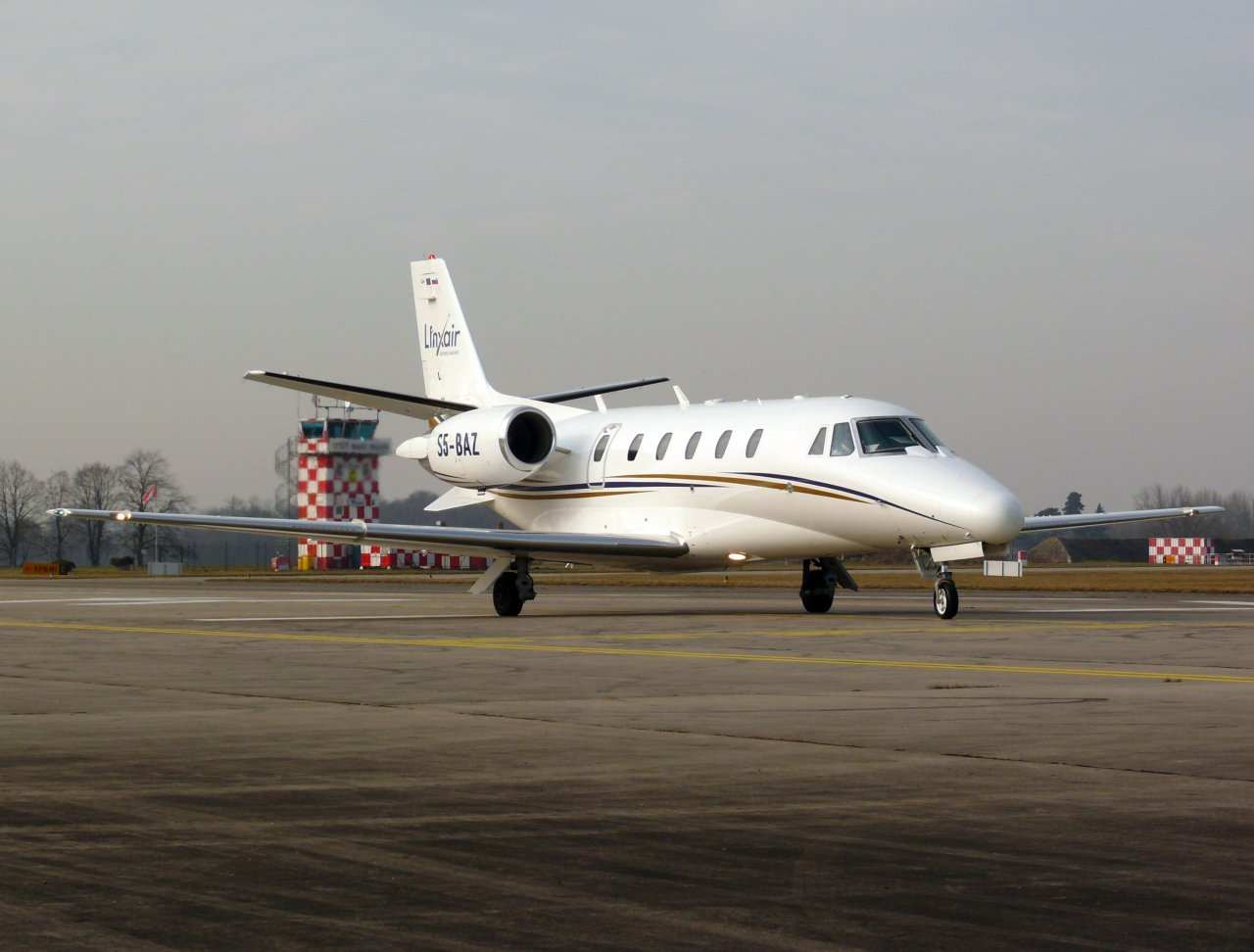
Evening departure of Cessna Citation Excel to Moscow

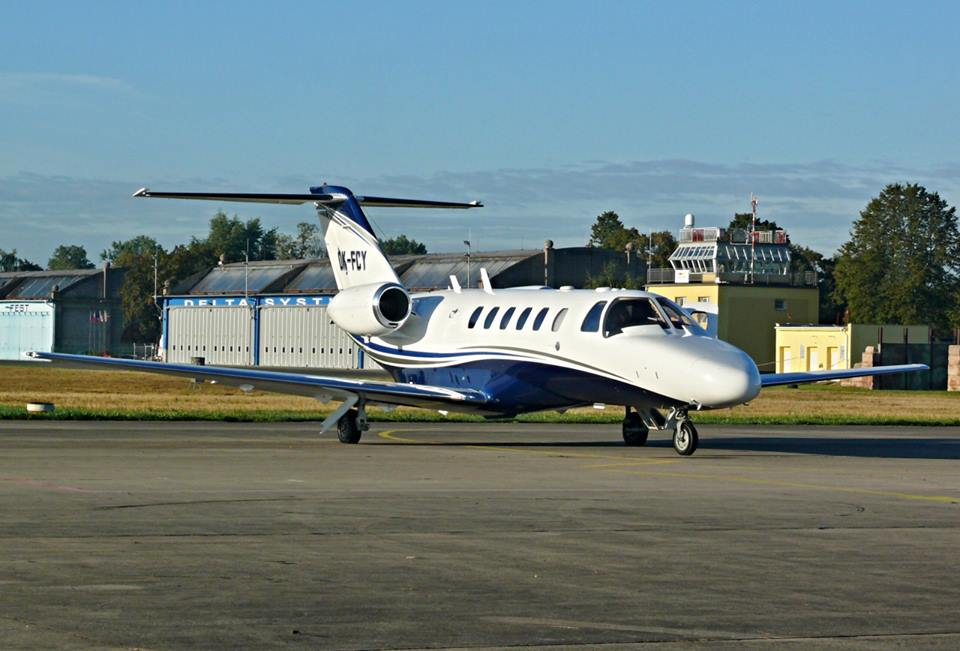
Early morning departure to Denmark

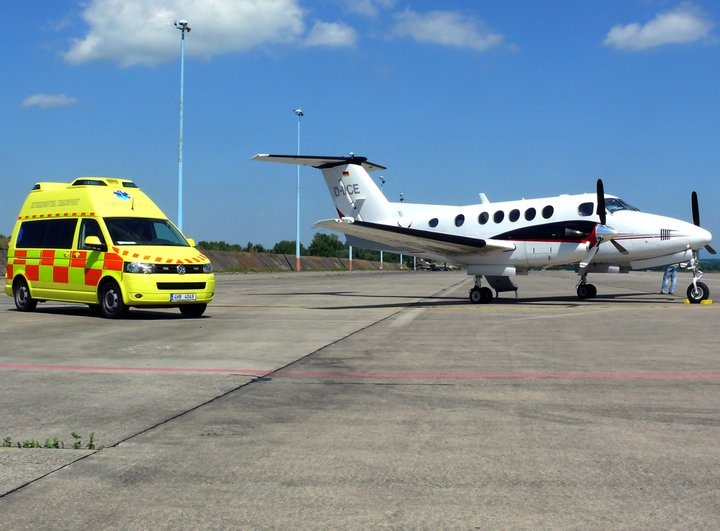
Medical flight (Air medical services)

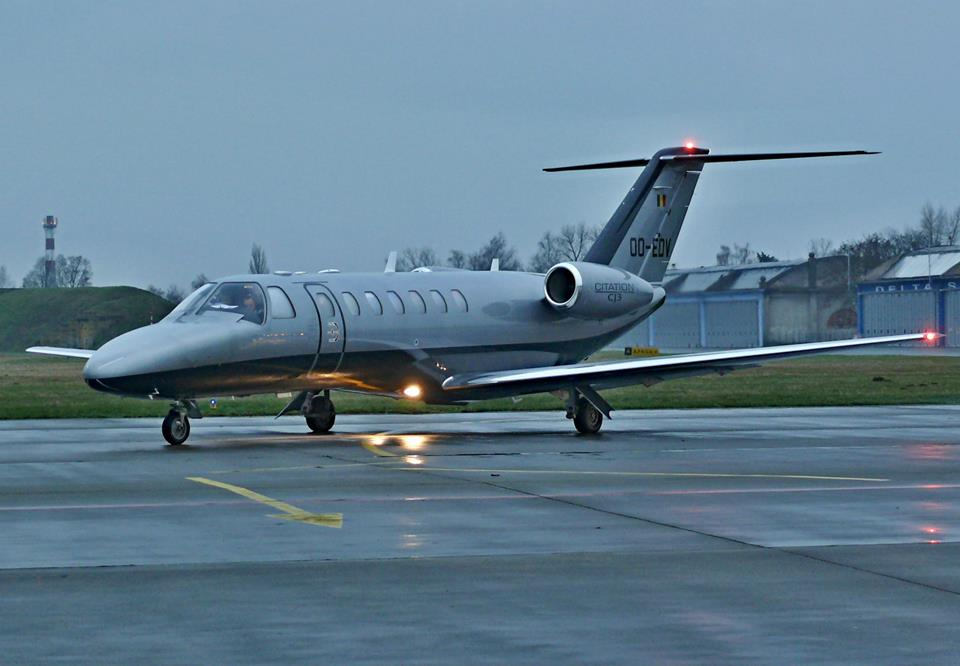
Departure in the rainy weather to Belgium

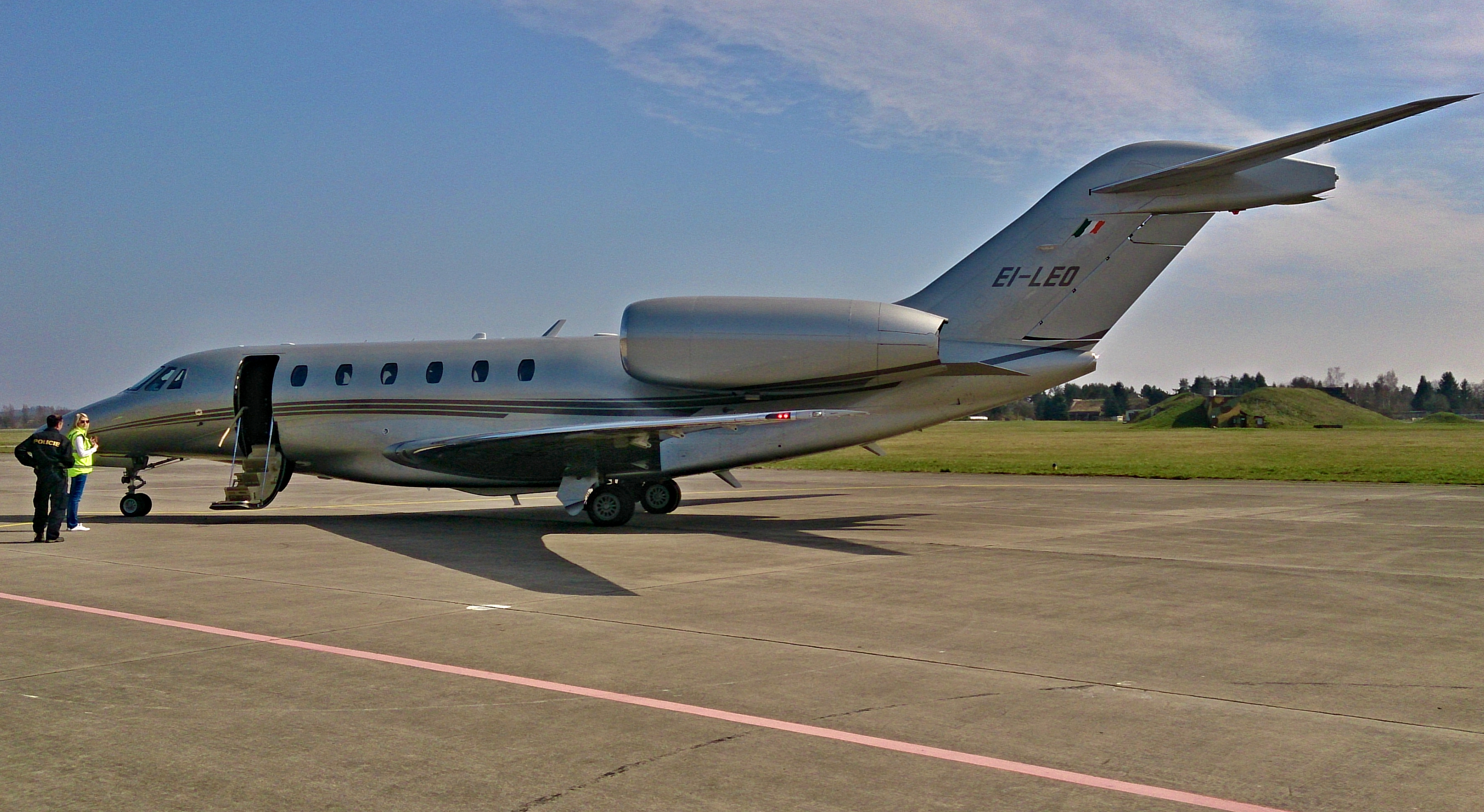
Arrival from United Kingdom
