= List of airlines of Cuba =

This is a list of airlines operating in Cuba.

== Active ==
| Airline | Image | IATA | ICAO | Callsign | Founded | Notes |
|---|---|---|---|---|---|---|
| Aerogaviota | KG | GTV | GAVIOTA | | 1994 | |
| Cubana de Aviación | CU | CUB | CUBANA | | 1929 | Flag carrier |

== Defunct ==
| Airline | Image | IATA | ICAO | Callsign | Founded | Ceased operations | Notes |
|---|---|---|---|---|---|---|---|
| Aero Caribbean | | 7L | CRN | AEROCARIBBEAN | 1982 | 2015 | merged into Cubana |
| Aerotaxi | | | CNI | | 1995 | 2009 | |

== See also ==
- List of airlines
- List of airlines of the Americas
- List of defunct airlines of the Americas
