= Cubana de Aviación =

State-owned flag carrier of Cuba

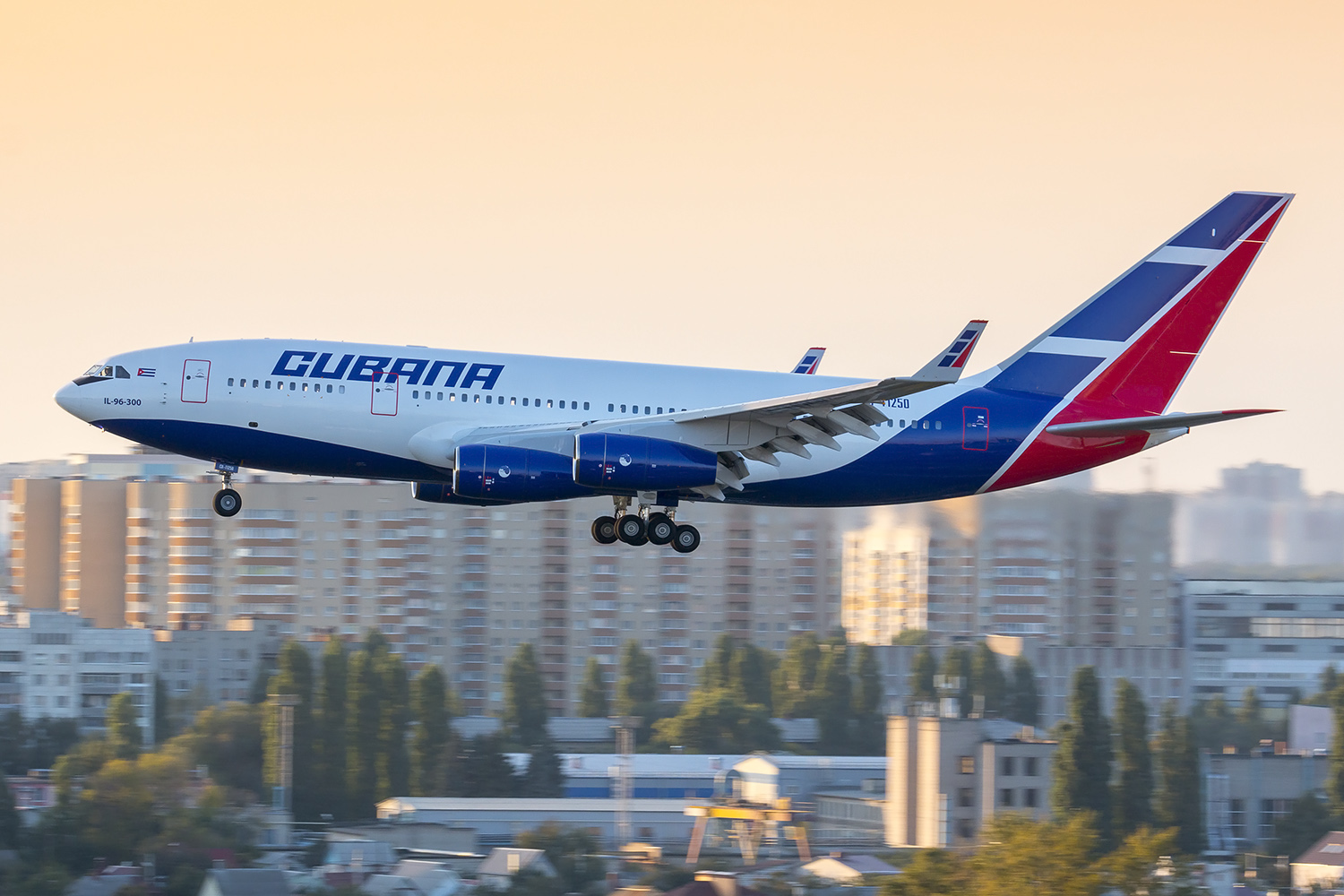
- IL-96-300
IATA	ICAO	Call sign
CU	CUB	CUBANA
- Founded: 8 October 1929; 97 years ago
- Commenced operations: 30 October 1930; 96 years ago
- Hubs: José Martí International Airport
- Fleet size: 15
- Destinations: 3
- Parent company: Corporación de la Aviación Civil S.A.
- Headquarters: Havana, Cuba
- Key people: Arturo Bada Álvarez (CEO)
- Website: cubana.cu

Cubana de Aviación S.A. (Spanish pronunciation: [kuˈβana ðe‿ˌaβjaˈsjon]; lit. 'Cuban Airlines'), or simply Cubana, is the flag carrier and largest airline of Cuba. It was founded in October 1929, becoming one of the earliest airlines to emerge in Latin America. It has its corporate headquarters in Havana, and its home base is located at José Martí International Airport. Originally a subsidiary of Pan American World Airways and later a private company owned by Cuban investors, Cubana has been wholly owned by the Cuban government since May 1959.

Cubana was a founder and is a current member of the International Air Transport Association (IATA), the International Association of Aeronautical Telecommunications (SITA) and the International Association of Latin American Air Transportation (AITAL).

== History ==
=== Early years to Cuban revolution ===
The airline was established by Clement Melville Keys on 8 October 1929 as Compañía Nacional Cubana de Aviación Curtiss S.A., initially as a flying school as well as a charter carrier, beginning scheduled services in 1930. The airline's name indicated its association with the Curtiss aircraft manufacturing company. Cubana's early fleet used Curtiss Robin, amphibian Sikorsky S-38, Ford Trimotor, and Lockheed Electra (L-10) aircraft. Pan American acquired Cubana in 1932, and the word Curtiss was deleted from the carrier's name. By the end of the decade, the carrier had a fleet of four Ford Trimotors and three Lockheed Electras that operated on the domestic Havana–Camaguey, Havana–Guantanamo–Baracoa and Santiago–Baracoa routes.

In 1944, the first International Conference on Civil Aviation was convened, which later would lead to the creation of the International Civil Aviation Organization (ICAO). Cuba was a participant in this conference and a founding member of ICAO. In April 1945, the conference that created the International Air Transport Association (IATA) was held in Havana. Cubana became a founding member of IATA, and participated in the creation of that organization through its involvement with the Havana conference and the resulting accords. Both conferences and the organizations they spawned helped establish Cubana as an internationally recognized airline company.

In May 1945 Cubana started its first scheduled international flights to Miami, using Douglas DC-3 aircraft, making the airline the first Latin American one to establish scheduled passenger services to this city. In April 1948, a transatlantic route was started between Havana and Madrid (via Bermuda, the Azores and Lisbon) using Douglas DC-4 aircraft. The Madrid route was extended to Rome in 1950. The new route to Europe made Cubana one of the earliest Latin American carriers to establish scheduled transatlantic service.

In 1953, Airwork sold Cubana three Viscount 755s in advance of delivery. Cubana was also the first Latin American airline to operate turboprop aircraft, starting in the mid-1950s with the Vickers Viscount (VV-755), which were put in service in its Miami and domestic routes, and later the Super Viscount (VV-818).

By March 1953, the carrier's fleet consisted of DC-3s and DC-4s. A year later, the strength of the fleet was 11 —six DC-3s, three Lockheed Constellations, one C-46 and one Stinson— while two Super Constellations were on order. Upon delivery of the first of these aircraft, in late 1954, the airline deployed it on the Mexico City–Madrid route. Cubana transported more than 227,000 passenger in 1955, and by that year end it had 715 employees. In May 1957, the airline ordered two Bristol Britannia 318s, intended to serve New York and Spain. An order for another two aircraft of the type was placed in mid-1958; the combined deal was worth US$14 million. Aimed at replacing the Douglas DC-7s on the Havana–New York route, Cubana received the first of these aircraft in December 1958; it was put in service on that route immediately after being phased in.

In the late 1950s Martin Fox, owner of the Tropicana Club, partnered with the airline. An airplane, the "Tropicana Special", made direct flights every Thursday from Miami to Havana.

=== Cuban revolution to 1980s ===
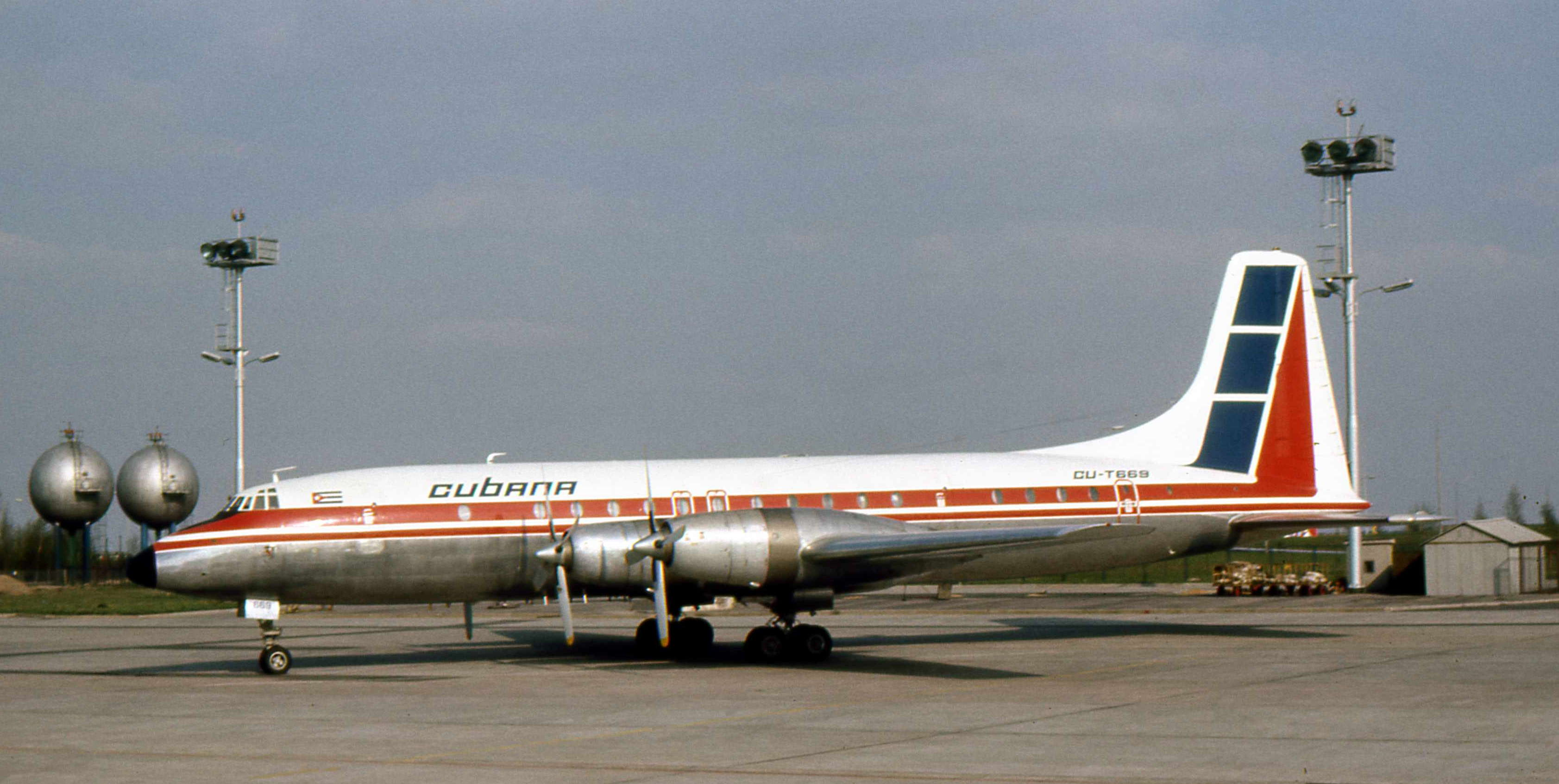
A Bristol Britannia 318 in 1975. The carrier received the first of these aircraft in December 1958.

In May 1959, Cuba's new revolutionary government decided to take over Cubana, expropriating all its investors. The private passenger airline Aerovías Q and private cargo carriers Cuba Aeropostal and Expreso Aéreo Interamericano, were then merged into Cubana, which was rebranded as Empresa Consolidada Cubana de Aviación and had an initial state investment of 80%; it started operations on 27 June 1961. The airline had expanded earlier that year its scheduled transatlantic services, adding Prague to its European route network that solely included Madrid. (Note: There exists a discrepancy as to whether these flights started in February 1961, or in April the same year.) Having stopovers at Bermuda and the Azores, the route was flown with Bristol Britannia 318s. Cubana later sold one of its Britannias to Czechoslovak Airlines (CSA) so that this carrier could start their own Prague–Havana flights. Cubana trained CSA's personnel in the operation of the Britannias. CSA's new service started in February 1962 initially flying the Prague–Manchester–Prestwick–Havana route, and then switching to the Prague–Shannon–Gander–Havana run.

With the U.S. breaking relations (in 1961) and the imposition of the U.S. embargo on Cuba (in 1962), Cubana was forced to cancel all its U.S. services and turned to the Soviet Union to obtain new aircraft. The first Soviet-built aircraft were delivered in the early 1960s (Ilyushin Il-14 and Il-18), and were used in Cubana's domestic routes. Cubana thus became the first airline in the Americas at that time to operate Soviet-built aircraft. During the decade, the An-12 and the An-24 also joined the fleet. Cubana's cooperation made it possible for Aeroflot to establish 18-hour non-stop scheduled services between Moscow and Havana in 1963, using Tupolev Tu-114 turboprop airliners, which were the longest non-stop flights in the world at that time. Cooperation with the East German airline Interflug also made it possible for this carrier to establish its first scheduled transatlantic services, linking East Berlin with Havana.

In March 1970 the number of employees was 1,971; at this time the carrier's fleet consisted of five Antonov An-24Bs, four Britannias 318s, two C-46s, four DC-3s, one DC-4, ten Il-14s and four Il-18s. Regular services to Peru, Chile, Panama, Guyana and several Caribbean destinations were started in the early and mid- 1970s. Cubana also began operating Tupolev Tu-154, Ilyushin Il-76, Yakovlev Yak-40 and Yak-42 jets in the mid-1970s. These aircraft made it possible to upgrade Cubana's domestic services and to expand or start new services to Central and South America, and to some Caribbean nations. Regular services to Canada were also started, as Cuba began to develop its tourism sector. Routes to Africa were started in the mid-1970s, serving Angola, Guinea-Bissau and Cabo Verde. Cubana subsequently ceded one of its Il-62M jets to Angola's national airline TAAG so that it could start its own Luanda-Havana flights, in cooperation with Cubana's services on that route. This allowed TAAG to start its own, first-ever transatlantic route. In the late 1970s Cubana started services to Iraq, becoming the first Latin American carrier to serve Asia, although these services were discontinued in the early 1980s.

=== 1990s ===
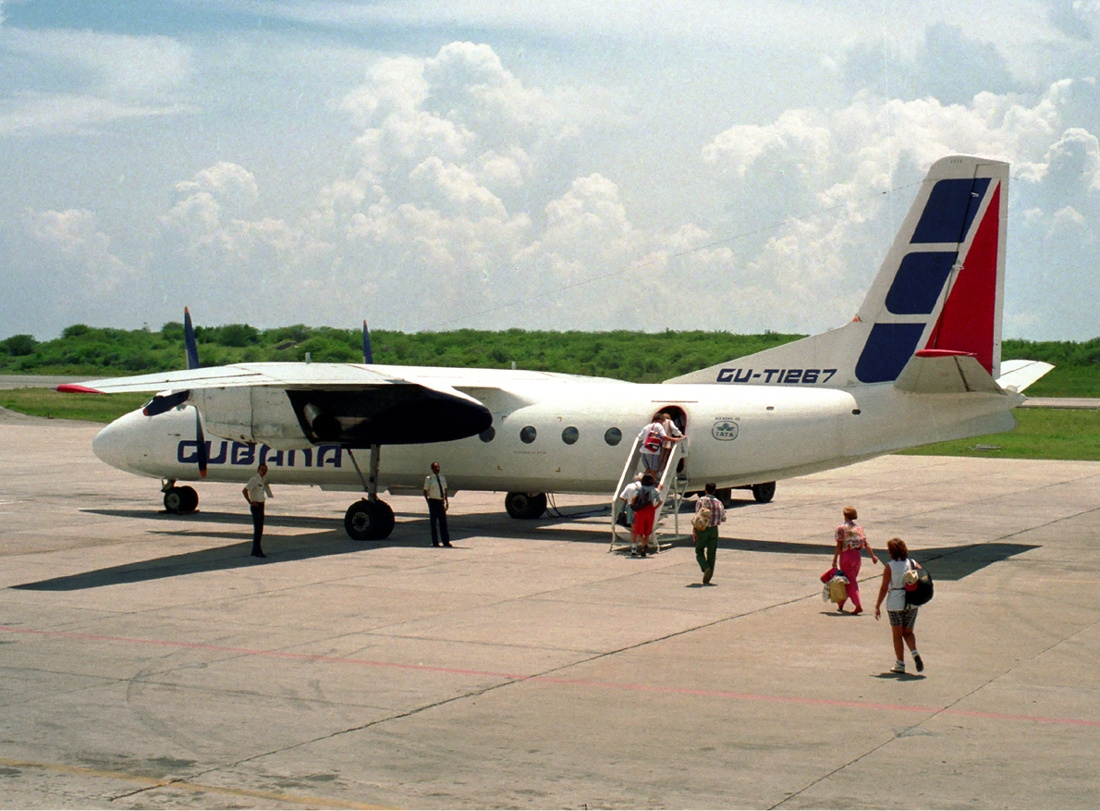
Cubana Antonov An-24 at Antonio Maceo Airport in 1996

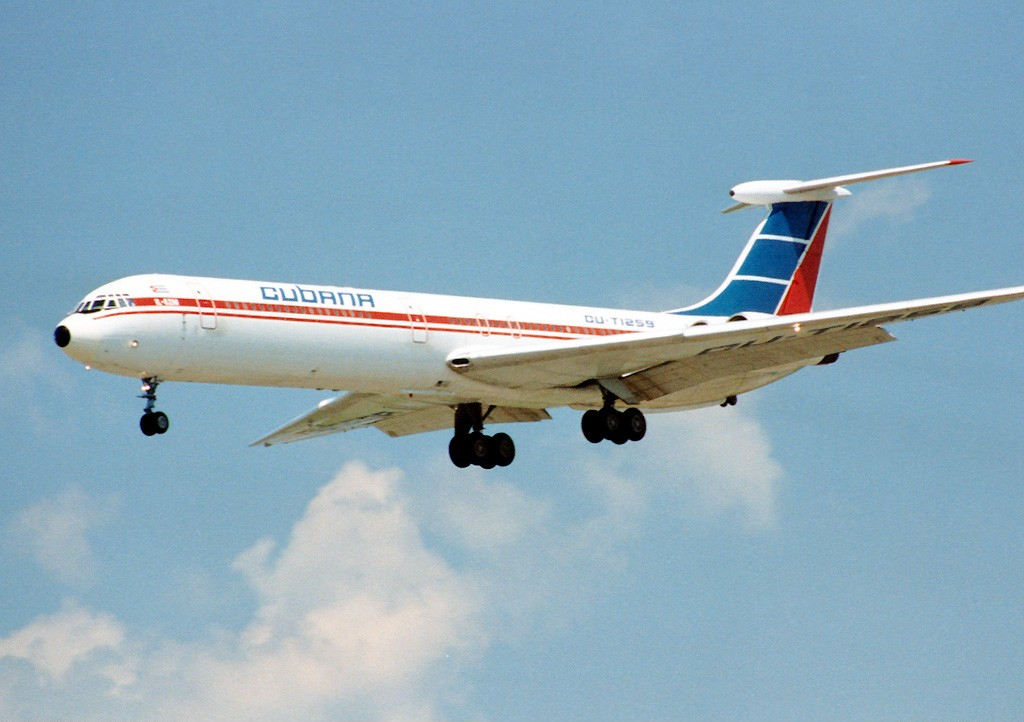
Cubana Ilyushin Il-62M, 1994

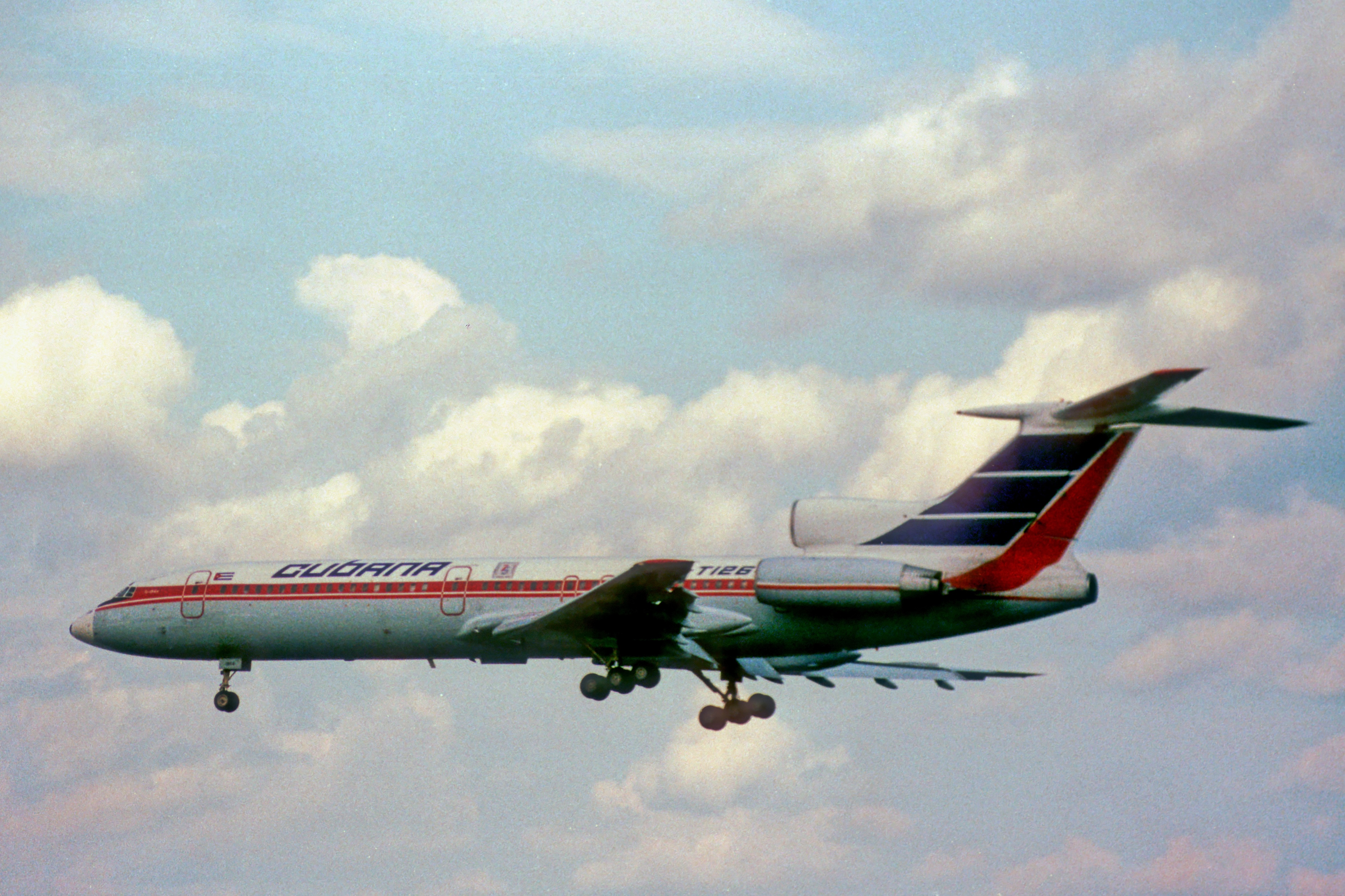
A Cubana Tupolev Tu-154

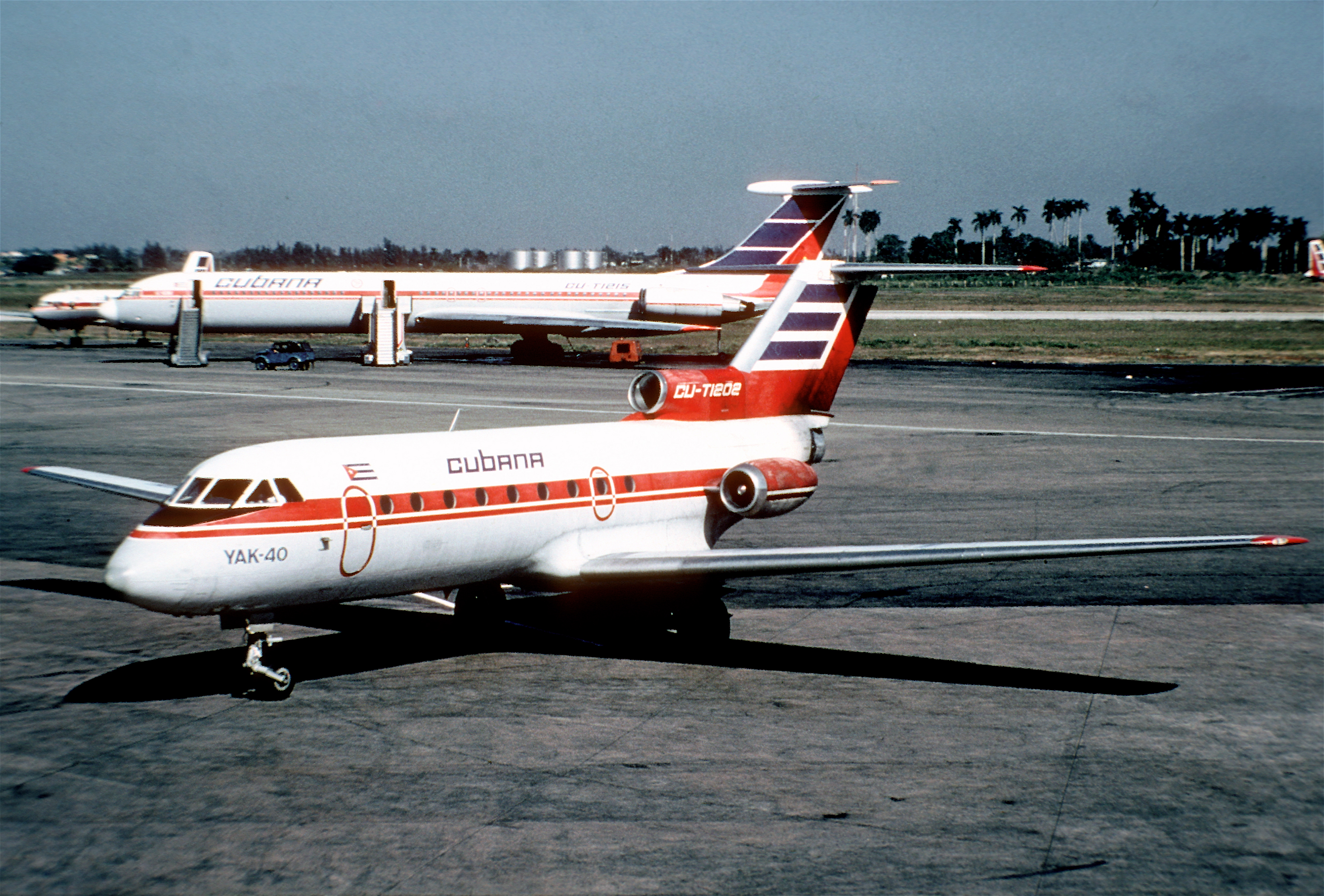
A Cubana Yakovlev Yak-40 at Havana Airport in 1987

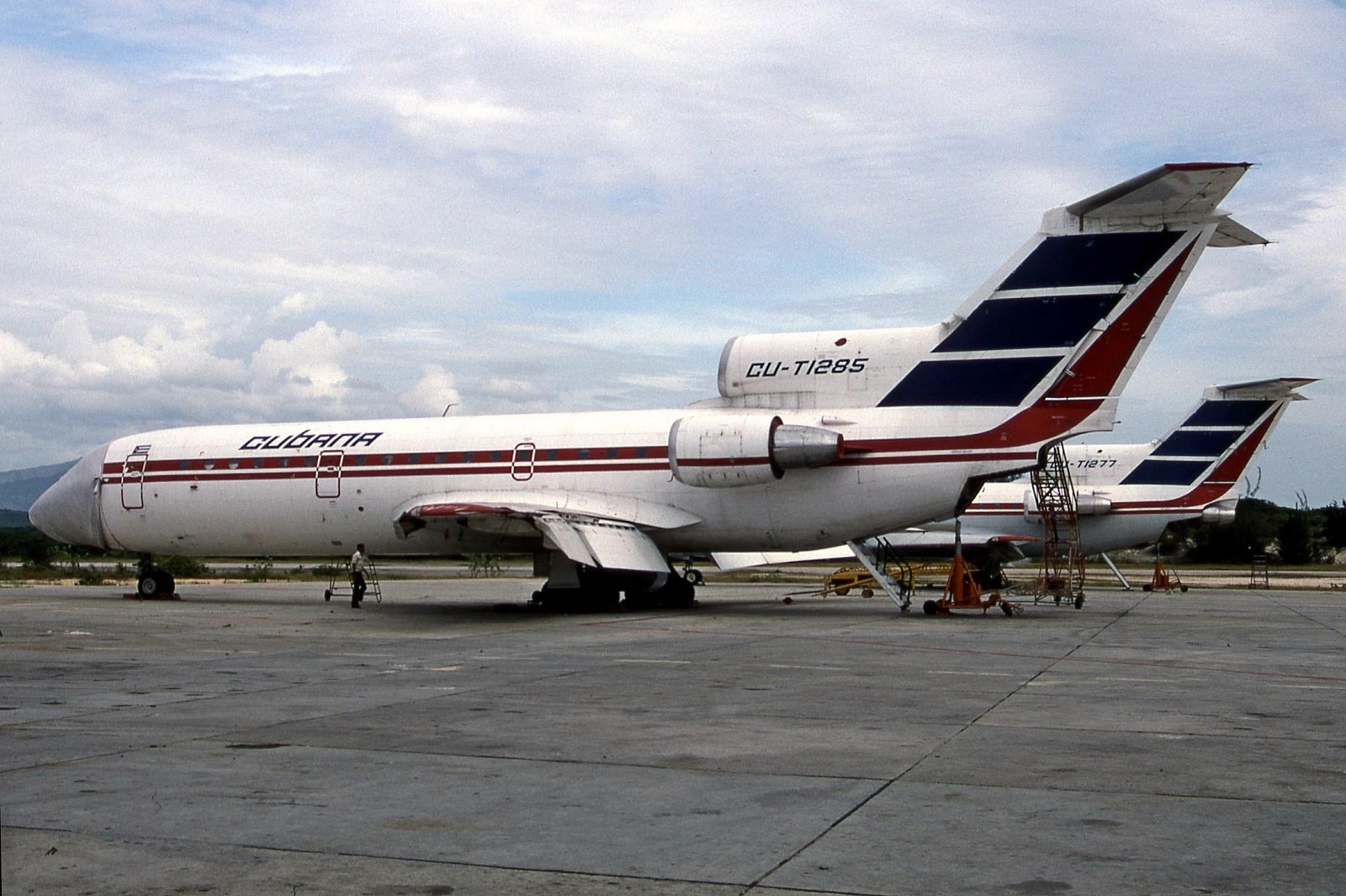
A Cubana Yakovlev Yak-42 at Santiago de Cuba Airport in 1993

As of March 1990, Cubana had 5,658 employees and its fleet consisted of 12 An-24RVs, 26 Antonov An-26s, four Il-18s, 11 Ilyushin Il-62Ms, two Il-76Ds, eight Tupolev Tu-154s (five Tu-154B2s and three Tu-154Ms) and 12 Yakovlev Yak-40s. At this time, the airline flew internationally to Barbados, Basel, Berlin, Bissau, Buenos Aires, Georgetown, Kingston, Lima, Luanda, Madrid, Managua, Mexico City, Montreal, Panama City, Paris and Prague; it also served a domestic network consisting of Baracoa, Camagüey, Holguín, Nicaro, Nueva Gerona, Santiago de Cuba and Las Tunas.

In the early 1990s, Cubana pursued a multi-faceted strategy to face the challenges posed by the dissolution of the Socialist bloc and the Soviet Union. This strategy targeted a restructuring of Cubana's fleet, the revamping of the airline's technical capabilities, and upgrading the quality of passenger services. After the early 1990s, spare parts for Cubana's Soviet-built aircraft became increasingly harder to source. Limited financial resources and lack of Western financing to replace these aircraft, coupled with restrictions imposed by the U.S. embargo on the sale of American-built aircraft and components (including engines and avionics), made it necessary to keep some of the airline's Soviet-built airplanes in service. Cubana had received its last three new Il-62Ms in late 1990 and early 1991 [along with two other (also new) similar aircraft in 1988 and 1989], and was able to keep them in service long after the Soviet Union's dissolution and the end of all Il-62 production in the mid-1990s. Cubana started leasing some Western aircraft (Airbus, Boeing) for limited periods of time in the mid-1990s, to help sustain its services to Europe, Canada and some Latin American destinations, given the rapid growth of Cuba's tourism sector.

=== 2000s and onwards ===
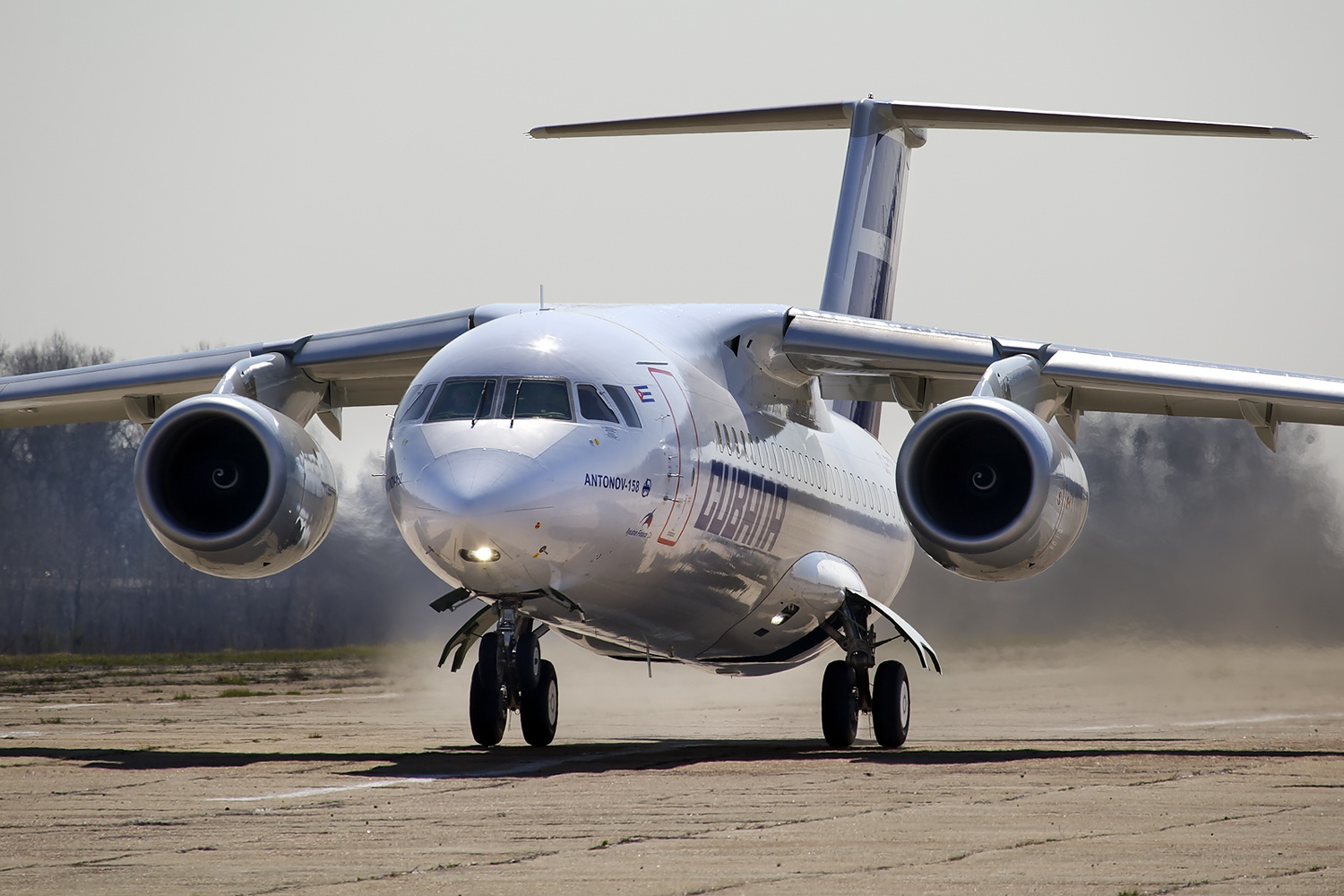
A Cubana Antonov An-158 at Kiev Airport in 2013

In the early 2000s, Cubana refurbished several of its Il-62Ms to use on some of its international routes (all but one of these aircraft were removed from service in 2011), and in 2004 it embarked on a long-term renovation programme. The strategy is based on the purchase of $100 million a year in new generation Russian-built aircraft until 2012. As of 2012, Cubana had completely renovated its fleet with new-generation Russian airliners. As part of its renovation strategy, Cubana has sought to upgrade its technical support capabilities. The airline established a joint venture company with Iberia Airlines of Spain in 2005, to maintain and overhaul Western-built aircraft, such as Airbus and Boeing.

In July 2004, the airline placed an order for two convertible Ilyushin Il-96-300s in a US$110 million deal; 85% of that price was financed by a loan from Roseximbank, while Cuba's Aviaimport raised the money for the balance. In December 2005, Cubana received the first of these aircraft, becoming the first customer of the type beyond the Russian borders. In April 2006, Cuba signed another deal —worth US$250 million this time— on behalf of Cubana for the purchase of another two Il-96-300s and three Tupolev Tu-204s. Two of these Tu-204s, one passenger and one cargo version, were handed over to the carrier in June and August 2007, respectively. During the August 2007 MAKS Airshow Cubana signed a memorandum of understanding with Ilyushin Finance Company (IFC) for the purchase of another two Tu-204s and three Antonov An-148s. A Tu-204 freighter was never delivered to the company due to financing problems.

In July 2012, Cubana de Aviación signed a contract with IFC for the delivery of three Antonov An-158 aircraft. In February 2013, Cubana signed a deal for the order of three 350-seater Ilyushin Il-96-400s. In April the same year, Cubana received its first Antonov An-158; Cubana received another two An-158s during 2013. The delivery of the third example marked the signing of another contract for three more aircraft of the type, scheduled for delivery in 2014. A fourth An-158 was delivered in April 2014; as of July 2014, Antonov was to deliver to the airline a fifth aircraft of the type. However, since 2018 all aircraft of this type are stored due to ongoing maintenance issues.

== Destinations ==
As of January 2025, Cubana operates scheduled flights on two domestic routes within Cuba as well as to two international destinations in Venezuela and Spain. In 2024, Cubana was forced to end further international flights to Argentina, which it had served from both Havana and Cayo Coco, after the airline has been refused further supply of fuel.

=== Codeshare agreements ===
Cubana de Aviación codeshares with the following airlines:

- Aeroflot
- Air Caraïbes
- Avianca
- Avianca El Salvador
- Neos
- Sunrise Airways

=== Interline agreements ===
- Hahn Air

== Fleet ==
=== Current fleet ===
As of July 2026, Cubana operates the following aircraft:

Cubana fleet
Aircraft	In fleet	Orders	Passengers			Notes
Aircraft	In fleet	Orders	C	Y	Total	Notes
Antonov An-158	6	—	—			
ATR 72-200	2	—	—	66	66	
Ilyushin Il-96-300	4	—	18	244	262	
Tupolev Tu-204-100E	2					
Tupolev Tu-204-100CE	1	—	Cargo			
Total	15	—				

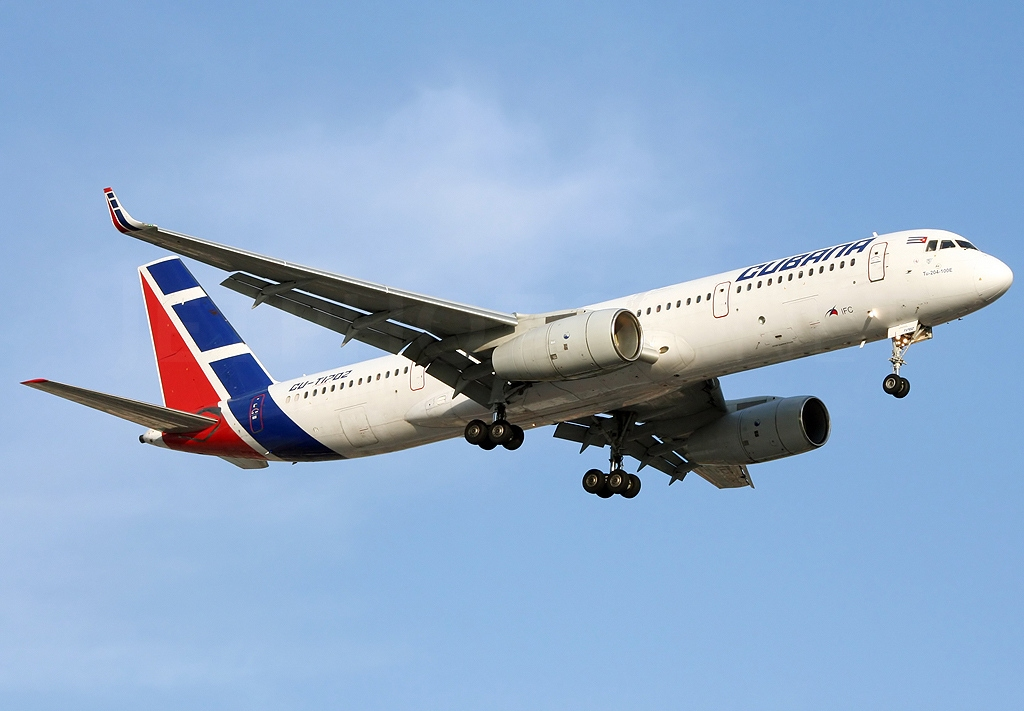
Tupolev 204-100E in 2012

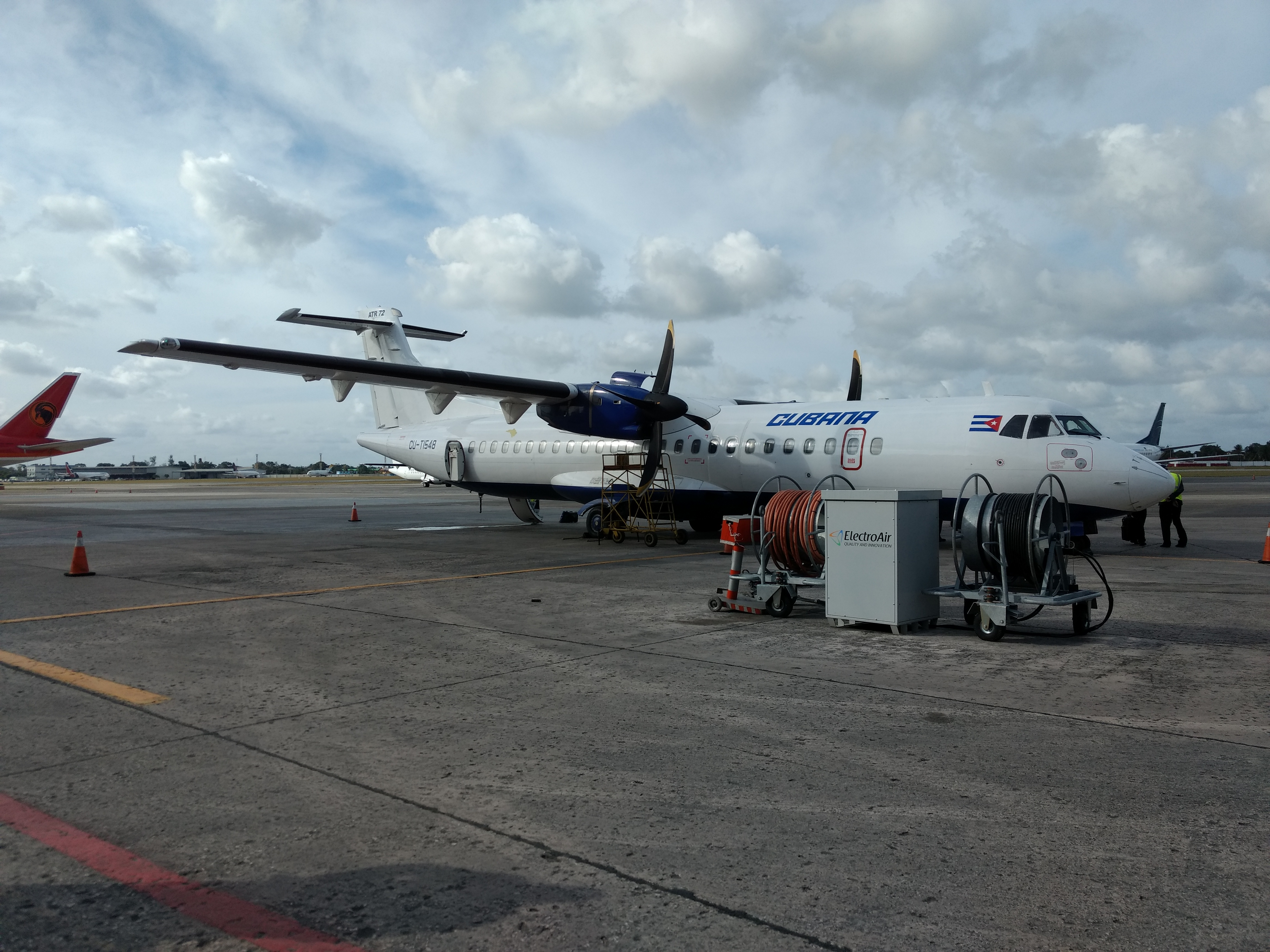
ATR 72-200 in 2018

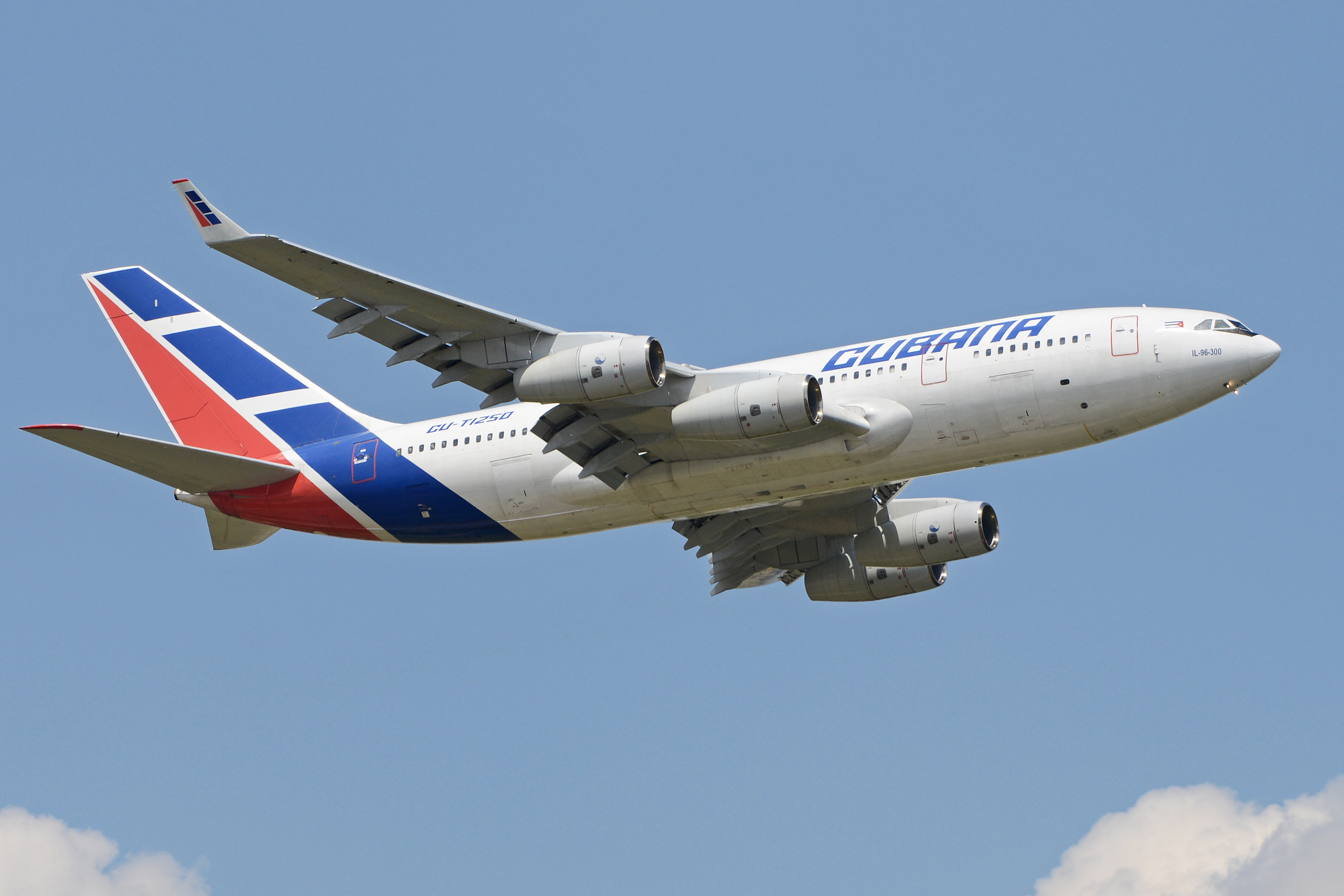
Ilyushin Il-96-300 in 2016

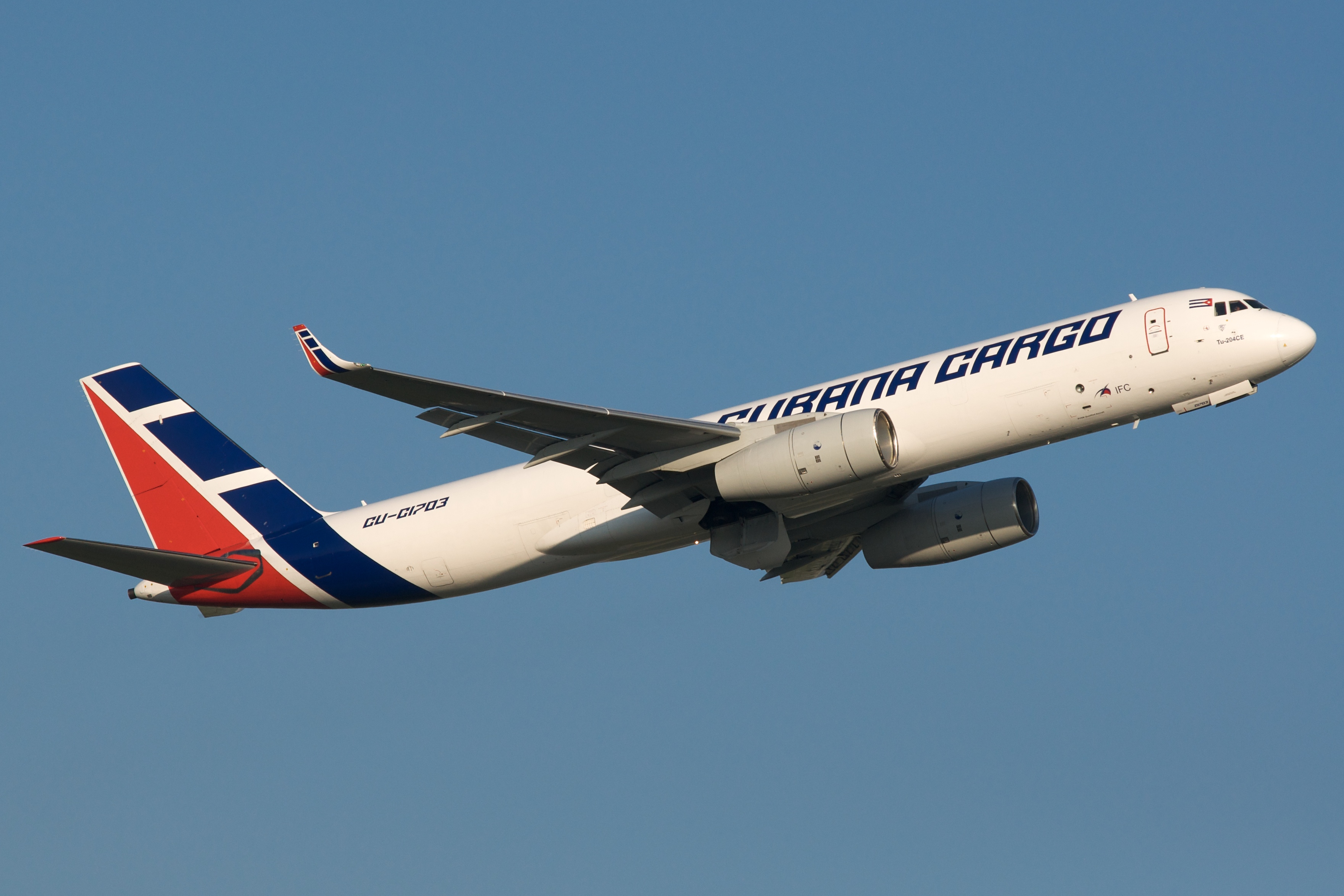
Tupolev Tu-204-100CE in 2010

=== Former fleet ===
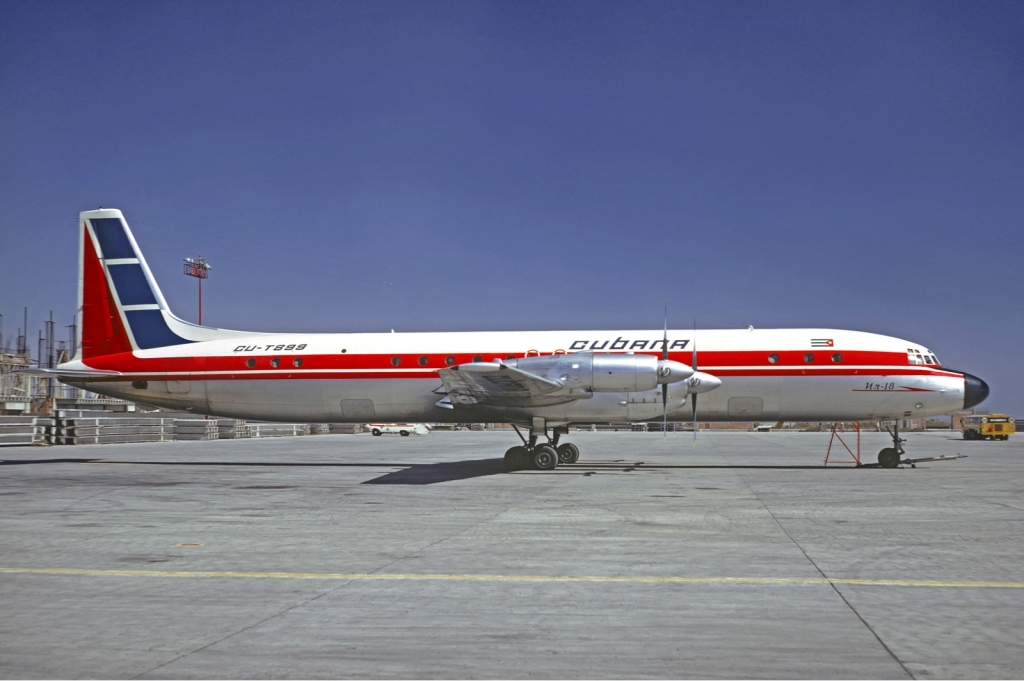
Ilyushin Il-18 at Mexico City Airport in 1971

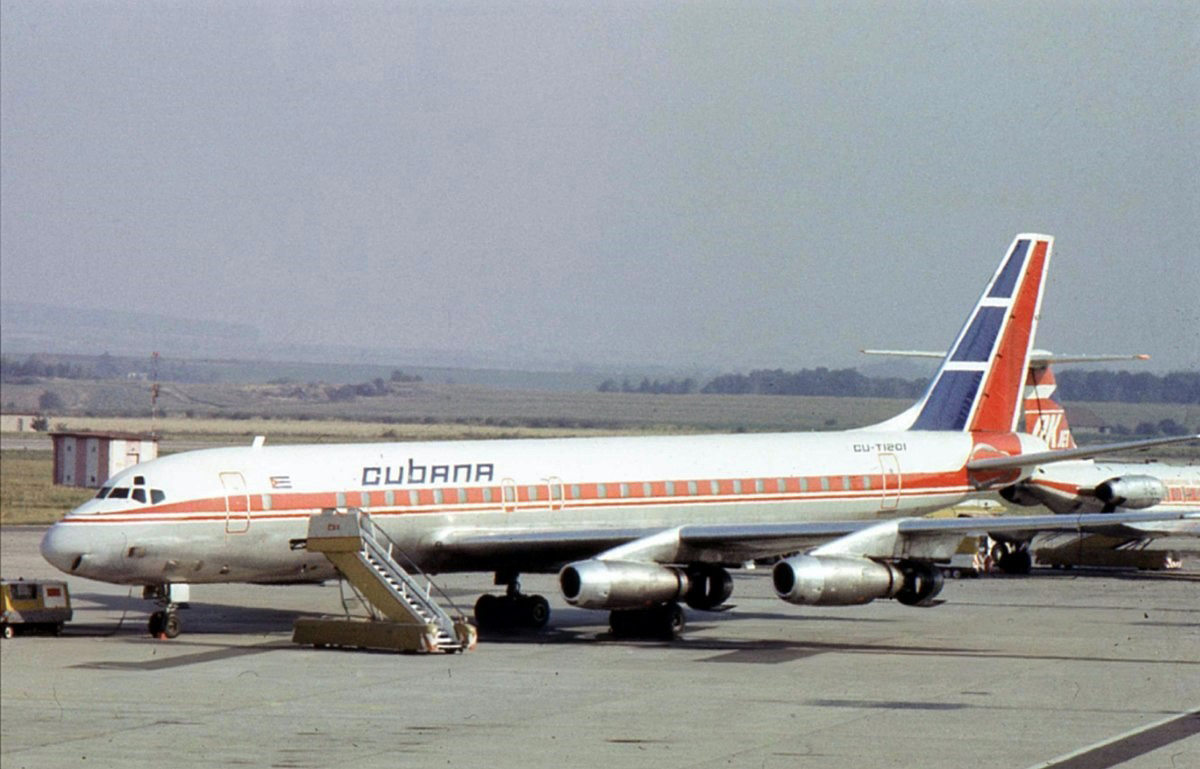
Douglas DC-8-40 at Madrid Barajas Airport in 1976

As of February 2025, Cubana operated 1 ATR 72-200, 4 Ilyushin Il-96, 2 Tupolev Tu-204-100 and 2 Tupolev Tu-204-100CE

The airline operated the following aircraft all through its history:

- Antonov An-12
- Antonov An-24B
- Antonov An-24RV
- Antonov An-26
- Antonov An-158
- Bristol Britannia 318
- Curtiss C-46 Commando
- Douglas DC-3
- Douglas DC-4
- Douglas DC-8-40
- Ford 4-AT-E Trimotor
- Ilyushin Il-14
- Ilyushin Il-18
- Ilyushin Il-62M
- Ilyushin Il-76
- Lockheed L-1049
- Lockheed L-1049G
- Vickers Viscount 755
- Yakovlev Yak-40
- Yakovlev Yak-42D

== See also ==
- List of airlines of Cuba
- Transport in Cuba
- Puertorriqueña de Aviación, an airline that was inspired by Cubana and Mexicana de Aviación
