= Aerotaxi =

Cuban charter airline

IATA	ICAO	Call sign
—	CNI	—
- Founded: 1995
- Ceased operations: 2009

Aerotaxi was a state-owned Cuban charter airline. It operated domestic services as well as some Caribbean charters.

== History ==
Aerotaxi was founded in 1995 and went out of business in 2009.

== Destinations ==
Aerotaxi operated charter flights to popular domestic and Caribbean tourist destinations, including Cayo Largo, Cayo Coco, Varadero, Trinidad, Cienfuegos, Nueva Gerona, Santiago de Cuba, Guardalavaca and Siguanea.

== Fleet ==
Aerotaxi's fleets consisted of the following aircraft types:

- Antonov An-2
- Cessna Skymaster
- Douglas DC-3
- Embraer EMB 110 Bandeirante
- Let L-410 Turbolet

== Accidents and incidents ==
- On 14 March 2002 an Aerotaxi Antonov An-2 with two crew and 14 passengers crashed, with all on board killed. The aircraft was on its way from Cienfuegos Jaime González Airport (CFG) to Cayo Coco Airport (CCC). While flying at an altitude of 3000 feet the top left wing snapped off. The aircraft entered a spin and crashed.
- On 6 December 2002 an Aerotaxi Embraer EMB 110 Bandeirante on a flight from Holguín - Frank País Airport (HOG) to Havana - José Martí International Airport (HAV) crash-landed short of the runway while approaching in heavy rain. All 10 occupants on board survived.
- On 19 March 2003 Aerotaxi Flight 887, a Douglas DC-3, en route from Nueva Gerona - Rafael Cabrera Airport (GER) to Havana - José Martí International Airport (HAV) was hijacked by six men using kitchen knives, tape and the airplane's own emergency hatchet. They demanded to be flown north to Miami. Florida Air National Guard F-15 Eagle fighter jets from Homestead Air Reserve Base and a UH-60 Black Hawk helicopter from the United States Customs Service escorted the Douglas DC-3 to Key West, Florida where it landed at 20:06. There were three crew members and 26 passengers on board; no one was injured.

== See also ==
- List of airlines of Cuba
