= ABS Jets =

Company in the Czech Republic

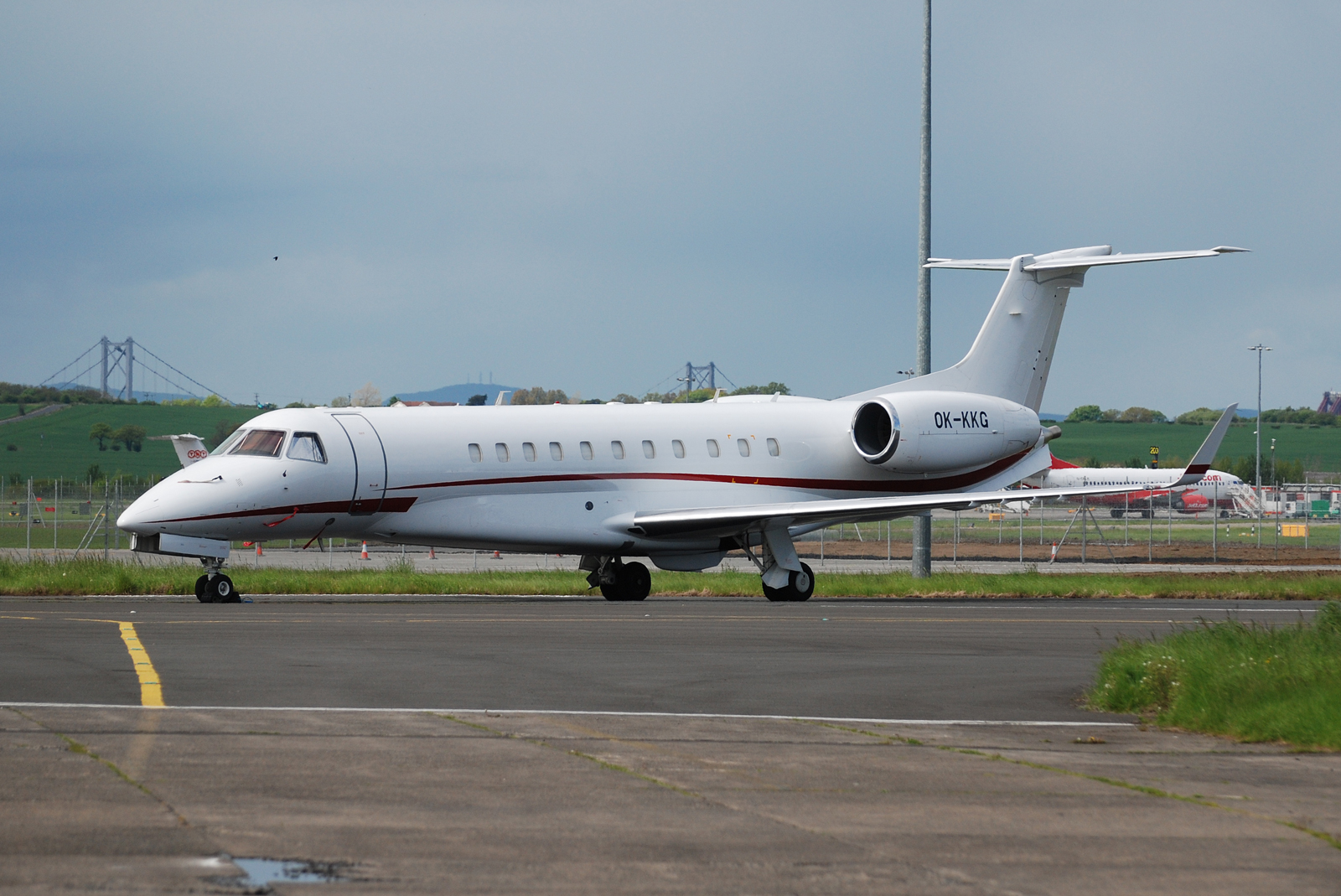
- Embraer ERJ
| IATA | ICAO | Call sign |
|---|---|---|
| — | ABP | BAIR |
- Founded: 2004
- Operating bases: Prague, Bratislava
- Hubs: Václav Havel Airport Prague
- Secondary hubs: M. R. Štefánik Airport
- Fleet size: 4
- Headquarters: Prague, Czech Republic
- Website: absjets.com

ABS Jets is a business jet operator based in Prague, Czech Republic, and Bratislava, Slovak Republic.

ABS Jets is a member of the European Business Aviation Association (EBAA), National Business Aviation Association (NBAA), and Russian Business Aviation Association (RBAA). It is certified as an Embraer Executive Aircraft Service Center.

== History ==
The company was founded in June 2004 and started operating in December of the same year. It specializes in charter flights, sales organization, repairs and maintenance of aircraft, aviation management, and planning of route schedules in other airlines. In 2007, ABS Jets acquired the hangar at Prague Václav Havel Airport.

In 2013, the company received 2 NBAA safety awards: the Commercial Business Flying Safety Award and the Aviation Support Services Safety Award.

In 2018, ABS Jets received the international IS-BAH award from IBAC.

Since January 2019, ABS Jets has the Stage II International Standard for Business Aircraft Handling (IS-BAH).

== Fleet ==
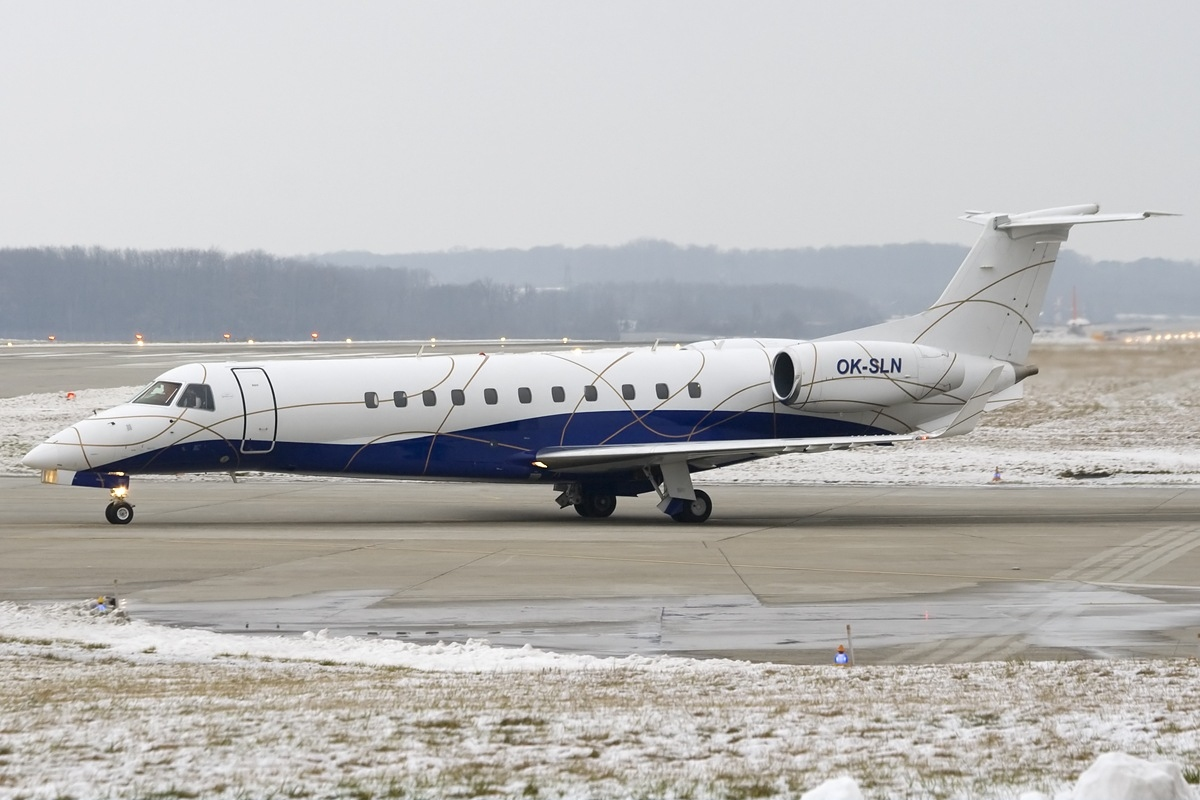
Embraer ERJ 135BJ Legacy at Geneva Cointrin airport

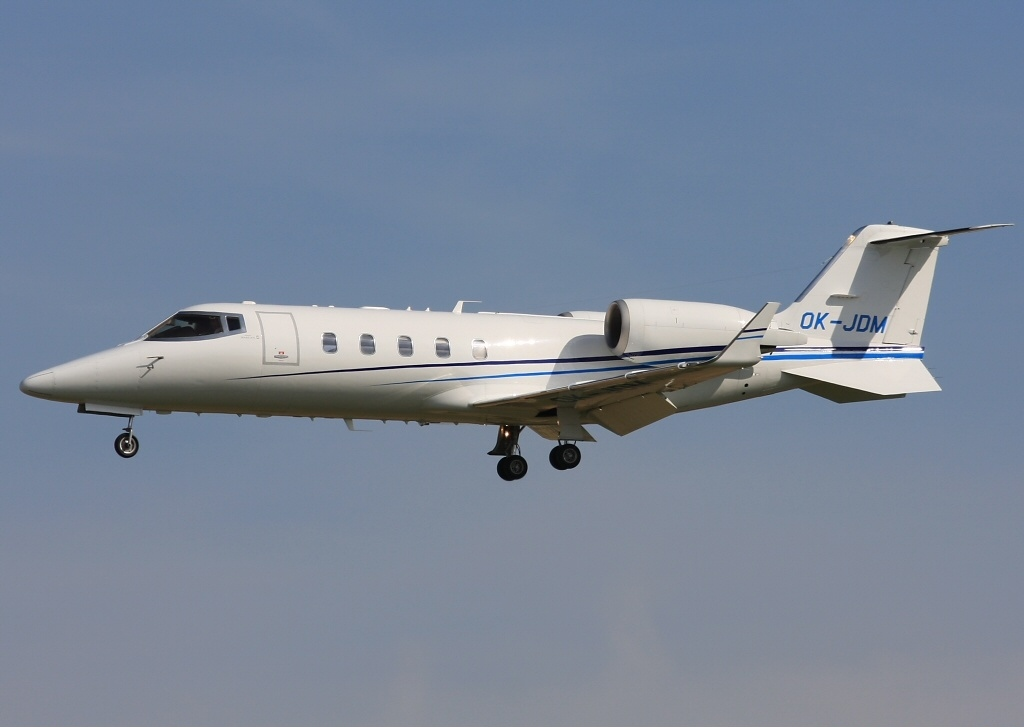
Learjet 60XR ABS Jets in 2013

The ABS Jets fleet includes the following aircraft (as of May 2024):

ABS Jets fleet
| Aircraft | Total | Orders | Notes |
|---|---|---|---|
| Embraer Legacy 600 | 4 | — | — |
| Total | 4 | 0 | |
