= Czech Connect Airlines =

Czech airline

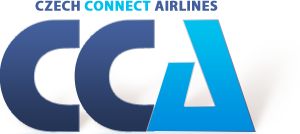

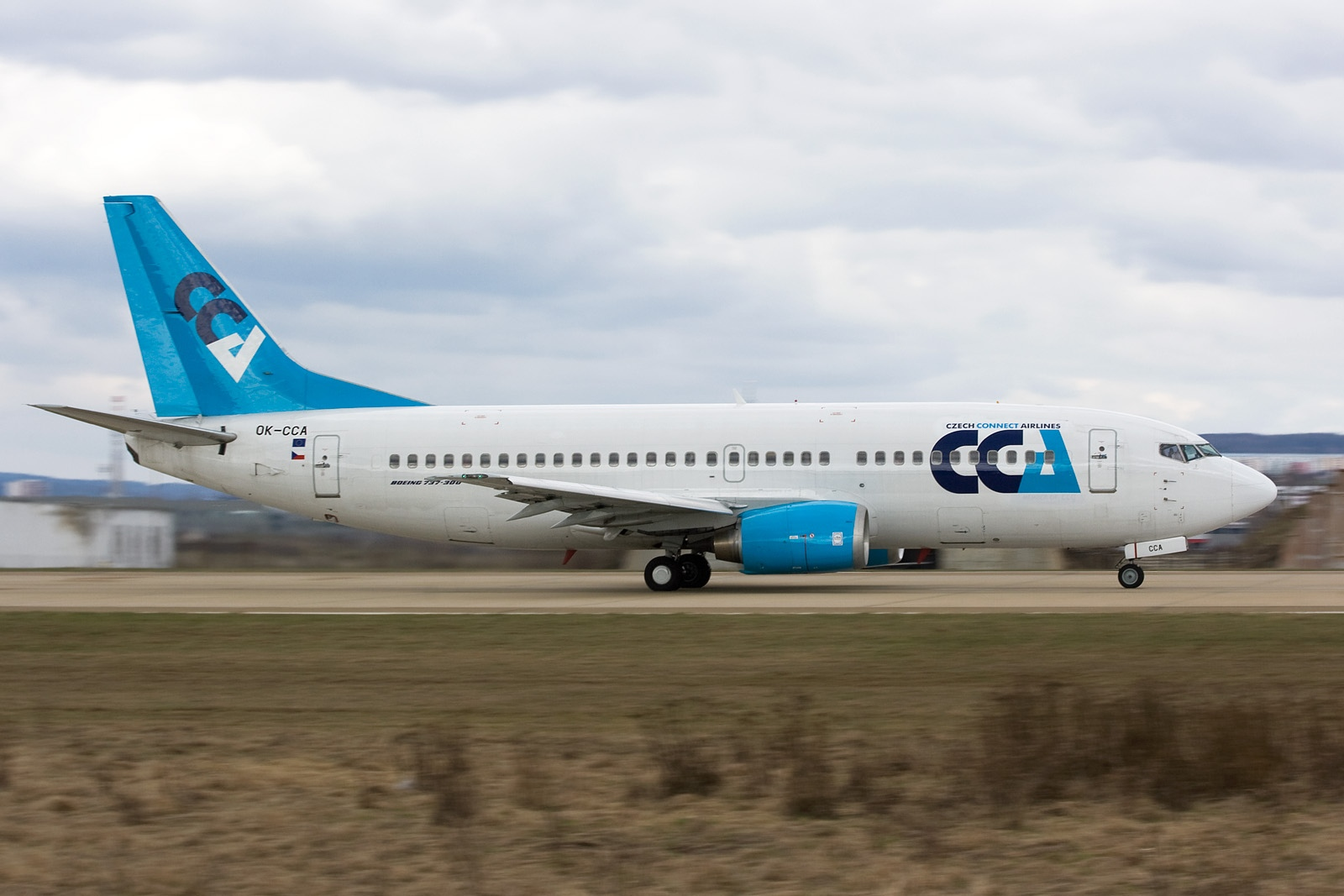
- Boeing 737-300
IATA	ICAO	Call sign
CQ	CCG	CZECH CONNECT
- Founded: 2010
- Ceased operations: January 2012
- Hubs: Brno-Tuřany Airport
- Focus cities: Karlovy Vary Airport
- Fleet size: 2
- Destinations: 5
- Headquarters: Ostrava, Czech Republic
- Website: www.flycca.net

Czech Connect Airlines was an airline based in Ostrava, Czech Republic. Its main base was Brno-Tuřany Airport.

== History ==
The air carrier was established as Central Charter Airlines and started unscheduled operations in May 2010 with Boeing 737 jetliners. In the course of 2011 the corporate name was changed to Czech Connect Airlines. After this it started scheduled flights to Russia and CIS and charter flights for travel agencies to various popular summer destinations. Selected flights were also available for individual travellers. In January 2012, the company announced bankruptcy and stopped its activities.

== Destinations ==
- Czech Republic
  - Brno – Brno-Tuřany Airport
  - Karlovy Vary – Karlovy Vary Airport
  - Pardubice – Pardubice Airport
  - Prague – Prague Ruzyně Airport
- Russia
  - Moscow – Domodedovo International Airport
  - Rostov-on-Don – Rostov-on-Don Airport
  - St. Petersburg – Pulkovo Airport
  - Yekaterinburg – Koltsovo Airport
- Switzerland
  - Geneva – Geneva International Airport

== Fleet ==
The Czech Connect Airlines fleet includes the following aircraft (as of 22 July 2011):

Czech Connect Airlines fleet
Aircraft	Total	Orders	Passengers	Notes
Boeing 737-300	1	0	Y148	
Boeing 737-400	1	0	Y156	
Total	2	0		
