= List of companies of Antigua and Barbuda =

Location of Antigua and Barbuda

Antigua and Barbuda is a twin-island country in the Americas, lying between the Caribbean Sea and the Atlantic Ocean. It consists of two major inhabited islands, Antigua and Barbuda, and a number of smaller islands (including Great Bird, Green, Guinea, Long, Maiden and York Islands and further south, the island of Redonda). The permanent population numbers about 81,800 (at the 2011 Census) and the capital and largest port and city is St. John's, on Antigua.

Tourism dominates the economy, accounting for more than half of the Gross Domestic Product (GDP). Antigua is famous for its many luxury resorts. Investment banking and financial services also make up an important part of the economy.

== Notable firms ==
This list includes notable companies with primary headquarters located in the country. The industry and sector follow the Industry Classification Benchmark taxonomy. Organizations which have ceased operations are included and noted as defunct.

Notable companies Status: P=Private, S=State; A=Active, D=Defunct
Name	Industry	Sector	Headquarters	Founded	Notes	Status	
Bank of Antigua	Financials	Banks	St. John's	1981	Owned by Stanford Financial Group (US), defunct 2009	P	D
Carib Aviation	Consumer services	Airlines	St. John's	1972	Airline, defunct 2008	P	D
Caribbean Star Airlines	Consumer services	Airlines	St. John's	2001	Airline, defunct 2007	P	D
Outlet	Consumer services	Publishing	St. John's	1968	Newspaper	P	A

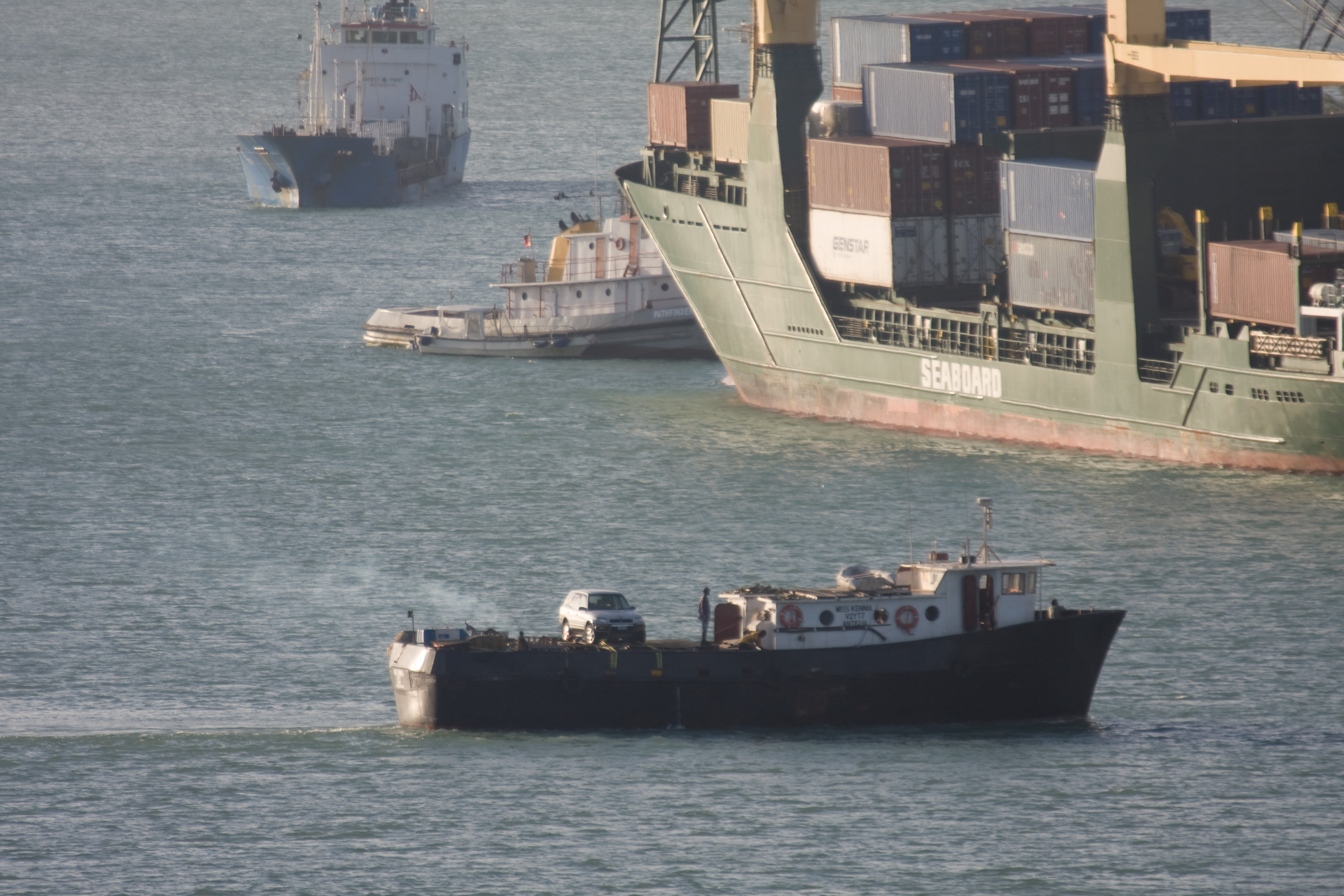
Commercial port in St. John's.

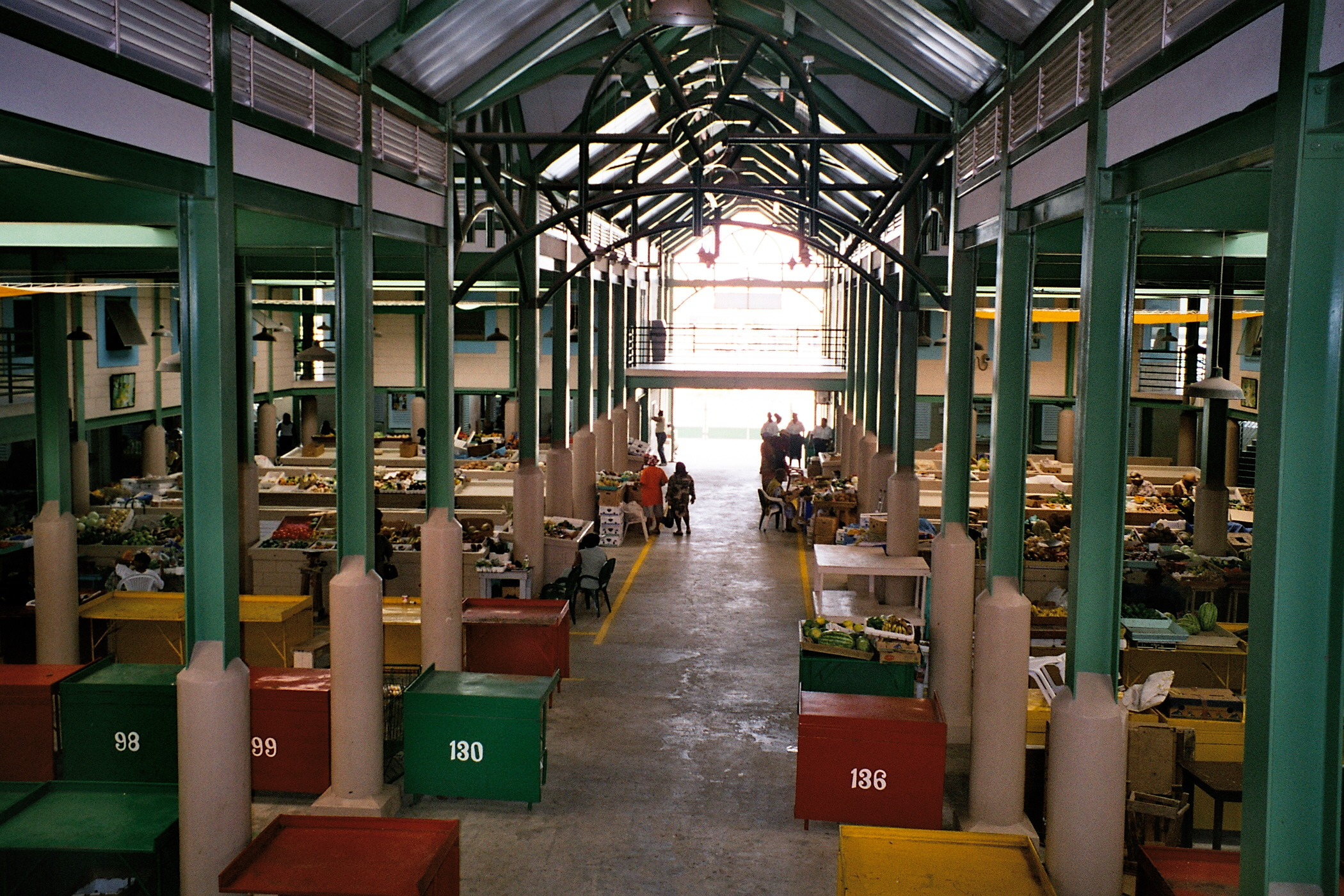
Indoor market in St. John's.
