= David Harris =

David Harris may refer to:

== Academics and literature ==
- David Harris (activist) (1946–2023), American author, journalist and anti-war activist
- Dovid Harris (born 1945), American dean of the Rabbinical Seminary of America / Yeshiva Rabbi Israel Meir Hacohen (Chofetz Chaim)
- David R. Harris (geographer) (1930–2013), British academic geographer, anthropologist and archaeologist
- David R. Harris (sociologist) (born 1969), American sociologist, president of Union College, provost of Tufts University and former dean of Cornell University
- David UU (David W. Harris, 1948–1994), Canadian experimental poet

== Entertainment ==
- Dave Harris (born 1971), American disc jockey, songwriter and musician
- David Harris (American actor) (1949–2024), American actor
- David Harris (Australian actor) (born 1975), Australian actor and singer
- David Ryan Harris (born 1968), American singer-songwriter

== Politics and government ==
- David B. Harris, Canadian former Security Intelligence Service planner and terrorism consultant
- David Bullock Harris (1814–1864), American Confederate States Army colonel during the American Civil War
- David Harris (American Revolution) (1754―1809), officer in the Continental Army during the American Revolutionary War
- David Harris (Illinois politician) (born 1948), American former Adjutant General of Illinois (1999–2003) and member of the Illinois House of Representatives (1983–1993 and 2011–2019)
- David Courtenay Harris, Dominican judge on the Eastern Caribbean Supreme Court
- David Harris (advocate) (born 1949), former CEO of the American Jewish Committee
- David Harris (Australian politician) (born 1966), Australian member of the New South Wales Legislative Assembly
- David Harris (British politician) (born 1937), British Conservative MP
- David Harris (MP for Bristol) (died 1582), British MP for Bristol
- K. David Harris, American former justice of Iowa Supreme Court

== Sports ==
=== Cricket ===
- David Harris (South Australia cricketer) (1930–2007), Australian cricketer
- David Harris (Victoria cricketer) (born 1966), Australian cricketer
- David Harris (English cricketer) (1755–1803), British cricketer

=== Other sports ===
- Dave Harris (baseball) (1900–1973), American baseball player
- David Harris (American football) (born 1984), American linebacker
- David Harris (Australian footballer) (born 1946), Australian rules footballer
- David Harris (footballer, born 1953), English footballer
- David Harris (rugby) (1879–1958), British rugby union and rugby league football player
- David Harris (rugby league), Australian rugby football player on the list of Cronulla-Sutherland Sharks players
- David Harris (umpire), Australian Australian rules football umpire

== Others ==
- David Harris (mason), American Welsh born stonemason in 1800s Iowa, United States
- David Harris (software developer) (born 1961), New Zealand software developer
- David Harris (South African businessman) (1852–1942), South African soldier, diamond magnate and legislator
- David A. Harris Jr., United States Air Force general
- David E. Harris (1934–2024), American pilot
- David Lynn Harris, American orthodontist who was murdered in 2002 by his wife
- David Ray Harris, American criminal and murderer, also featured in the 1988 film The Thin Blue Line for a different murder
