= Chadbourne & Parke, LLP v. Troice =

- Supreme Court of the United States

Decided February 26, 2014
- Full case name: Chadbourne & Parke, LLP v. Troice
- Citations: 571 U.S. 377 (more)

Holding
- The Securities Litigation Uniform Standards Act does not preclude civil class actions under state law.

Court membership
- Chief Justice John Roberts Associate Justices Antonin Scalia · Anthony Kennedy; Clarence Thomas · Ruth Bader Ginsburg; Stephen Breyer · Samuel Alito; Sonia Sotomayor · Elena Kagan

Case opinions
- Majority: Breyer, joined by Roberts, Scalia, Thomas, Ginsburg, Sotomayor, Kagan
- Concurrence: Thomas
- Dissent: Kennedy, joined by Alito

Laws applied
- Securities Litigation Uniform Standards Act

Chadbourne & Parke, LLP v. Troice, 571 U.S. 377 (2014), was a United States Supreme Court case in which the court held that the Securities Litigation Uniform Standards Act does not preclude civil class actions under state law.

== Background ==
The Securities Litigation Uniform Standards Act of 1998 forbids the bringing of large securities class actions "based upon the statutory or common law of any State" in which the plaintiffs allege "a misrepresentation or omission of a material fact in connection with the purchase or sale of a covered security." The Act defines "covered security" to include only securities traded on a national exchange.

Four sets of plaintiffs, including Troice, filed civil class actions under state law, contending that the defendants, including Chadbourne & Parke, LLP, helped Allen Stanford and his companies perpetrate a Ponzi scheme by falsely representing that uncovered securities (certificates of deposit in Stanford International Bank) that plaintiffs were purchasing were backed by covered securities. The federal District Court dismissed each case under the Litigation Act. Although the certificates of deposit were not covered securities, the court concluded, the Bank's misrepresentation that its holdings in covered securities made investments in its uncovered securities more secure provided the requisite "connection" (under the Litigation Act) between the plaintiffs' state-law actions and transactions in covered securities. The Fifth Circuit Court of Appeals reversed, concluding that the falsehoods about the Bank's holdings in covered securities were too tangentially related to the fraud to trigger the Litigation Act.

== Opinion of the court ==
The Supreme Court issued an opinion on February 26, 2014.
