= David Courtenay Harris =

David Courtenay Harris was a High Court Judge on the Eastern Caribbean Supreme Court. A native of Dominica, he was assigned to reside in and hear cases from Antigua and Barbuda beginning in 2007. One of the cases he heard involved the Stanford International Bank of R. Allen Stanford. He is a graduate of the University of Windsor in Ontario.
