= Gilbert Lopez =

Former accounting executive

Gilbert T. Lopez Jr.
- Born: 1943 (age 82–83)
- Occupation: Accounting executive
- Employer: Stanford Financial Group
- Known for: Stanford Financial Group Ponzi scheme
- Status: Released from custody (December 20, 2024)
- Conviction: November 19, 2012
- Criminal charges: Wire fraud, conspiracy to commit wire fraud
- Penalty: 20 years imprisonment; 3 years supervised release; $25,000 fine

Details
- Imprisoned at: February 14, 2013 – December 20, 2024

Gilbert T. Lopez Jr. (born 1943) is a former accounting executive who served as Chief Accounting Officer at Stanford Financial Group. He gained notoriety for his role in orchestrating and concealing the massive Ponzi scheme masterminded by R. Allen Stanford—through which millions of dollars were misappropriated from Stanford International Bank clients.

In November 2012, a federal jury convicted Lopez on nine counts of wire fraud and one count of conspiracy to commit wire fraud. He was sentenced in February 2013 to 20 years in prison, along with three years of supervised release and a $25,000 fine, and was also found to have committed perjury during his trial.

== History ==
Lopez was found guilty by a federal jury in Houston on November 19, 2012, of aiding Robert Allen Stanford in a fraud scheme involving Stanford International Bank (SIB).

Evidence at Lopez's trial showed that he knew about and monitored Stanford's misappropriation of SIB's assets, concealed the misappropriation from the public and nearly every other Stanford employee, and worked behind the scenes to keep it from being discovered. Additionally, he assisted Stanford in deceiving SIB clients during the late 2008 financial crisis by claiming that Stanford had invested hundreds of millions of dollars in SIB when in fact he had not. Lopez assisted in the creation of a fraudulent real estate deal that involved inflating the value of land parcels that were bought for $63.5 million to a fictitious $3.2 billion.

Prosecutor Jeffrey Goldberg said Stanford could not have carried out the fraud without help. He said Lopez - in his post as chief accounting of Stanford Financial Group - actively covered up his boss’s fraud. “Gil Lopez and Mark Kuhrt were faced with the same choice over and over again, to either help Allen Stanford lie to his customers and misuse their money or say ‘I don’t want to be part of it”. The men chose to “keep it secret and actively work to keep others from finding out about it.” added Goldberg during the trial.

Lopez's trial lasted for five weeks. The jury deliberated for about three days before finding Lopez guilty on ten of the eleven counts in the indictment. He was found guilty on nine counts of wire fraud and one count of conspiracy to commit wire fraud. On one count of wire fraud, Lopez was found not guilty. He was promptly remanded into custody following the trial.

On February 14, 2013 Lopez was sentenced to 20 years in prison. In addition to the prison terms, U.S. District Judge David Hittner, who presided over the trial, sentenced Lopez to serve three years of supervised release and ordered Lopez to pay a $25,000 fine. Judge Hittner also found that Lopez obstructed justice by committing perjury at trial.

The conviction was upheld by the appeals court on June 5, 2015.

On December 12, 2024, Lopez's sentence was commuted by President Joe Biden along with nearly 1500 other individuals who were previously released under the CARES Act, which allowed people with a high risk of COVID-19 to be released from prison into home detention.

Lopez (Inmate Register Number: 99141-179) was released on December 20, 2024.
