= Laura Pendergest-Holt =

American financier and convicted Ponzi scheme perpetrator

- Born: July 23, 1973 (age 53); Baldwyn, Mississippi
- Occupation: Former financier
- Spouse: Jim Holt
- Children: 1
- Status: Incarcerated at Federal Medical Center, Lexington; Lexington, Kentucky; released on April 23, 2015
- Conviction: June 21, 2012 (pleaded guilty)
- Criminal charge: Obstruction of justice
- Penalty: Three years in prison, three years' supervised release

Laura Pendergest-Holt (born July 23, 1973) is a convicted Ponzi scheme perpetrator, financier, and former chief investment officer of Stanford Financial Group, who was charged with a civil charge of fraud on February 17, 2009. On May 12, 2009, Pendergest-Holt was indicted by a federal grand jury on two counts of a criminal complaint of obstructing a fraud investigation and conspiracy to obstruct justice. In early 2009, Stanford Financial became the subject of several fraud investigations, and on February 17, 2009, Pendergest-Holt was charged by the U.S. Securities and Exchange Commission with fraud and multiple violations of U.S. securities laws for alleged "massive ongoing fraud" involving $8 billion in certificates of deposit. The FBI raided three of Stanford's offices in Houston, Memphis, and Tupelo, Mississippi. On February 27, 2009, the SEC amended its complaint to describe the alleged fraud as a "massive Ponzi scheme". On June 21, 2012, she pleaded guilty to obstructing a U.S. Securities and Exchange Commission investigation into Stanford International Bank (SIB), the Antiguan offshore bank owned by Robert Allen Stanford. On September 13, 2012, Holt was sentenced to three years in prison, followed by three years of supervised probation. She was released on April 23, 2015.

== Regulatory investigation ==
During the week of February 13, 2009, Stanford issued a letter to clients saying: "Regulatory officers have visited our offices and have stated that these are routine examinations". On February 17, 2009, U.S. federal agents entered the company's Houston and Memphis offices. Law enforcement officials placed signs on the office doors stating that the company was temporarily closed: "The company is still in operation but under the management of a receiver".

The company is still in operation but under the management of a receiver.
--Signs placed February 17, 2009 at Houston office by law enforcement

—

The Securities Exchange Commission (SEC) charged Pendergest-Holt, Allen Stanford, and James M. Davis of fraud in connection with Stanford Financial Group's US$8 billion certificate of deposit (CD) investment scheme that offered "improbable and unsubstantiated high interest rates". This led the federal government to freeze the assets of Allen Stanford, Stanford International Bank, Stanford Group Co., and Stanford Capital Management. In addition, Stanford International Bank placed a 60-day moratorium on early redemptions of its CDs.

On February 18 and 19, 2009, Ecuador and Peru suspended the operations of local Stanford units, and, in Venezuela and Panama, the governments seized local units of Stanford Bank. Mexico's financial regulator announced on February 19 that it was investigating the local affiliate of Stanford bank for possible violation of banking laws.

On February 26, 2009, Pendergest-Holt was arrested by federal agents in connection with the alleged fraud. On February 27, the SEC said that Stanford and his accomplices operated a "massive Ponzi scheme", misappropriated billions of investors' money and falsified the Stanford International Bank's records to hide their fraud. "Stanford International Bank's financial statements, including its investment income, are fictional," the SEC said.

== Indictment on civil securities fraud complaint ==
The FBI alleges that Pendergest-Holt met with several Stanford corporate officers in Miami in February 2009 to prepare for her testimony with the SEC. The FBI alleges that at the meeting she discussed the Stanford International Bank's Tier III Portfolio and a $1.6 billion loan to a shareholder (Allen Stanford) from the Tier III Portfolio. The portfolio represented about 81 percent of the bank's portfolio. The FBI complaint alleges that when Pendergest-Holt met with SEC investigators she made:

several misrepresentations under oath. Pendergest-Holt also allegedly misrepresented her own preparatory work for the testimony, saying she had met with no one other than the attorney as she worked to ready herself for the session with the SEC.

The complaint alleges that she failed to tell investigators during testimony that she was a member of the Stanford International Bank's investment committee or the extent of her knowledge of the bank's Tier III Portfolio. The complaint also says that, during an interview on February 17 with the SEC in Memphis, Tennessee, Pendergest-Holt "continued to obstruct the SEC's investigation by saying she had no knowledge of the Tier III Portfolio."

Michael Zarich, Stanford's senior investment officer, has told authorities he did not know where ninety percent of Stanford's portfolio was invested. Zarich has said he was trained by Pendergest-Holt to deflect questions about the investment strategy while pitching to wealthy clients in Antigua, where the bank was chartered. When he tried to learn how the money was invested, Zarich has said Pendergest-Holt and Davis turned him away. Zarich also has said Pendergest-Holt armed him with answers for potential investors worried about the size of Stanford's tiny, Antigua-based auditor.

== Indictment on criminal obstruction of justice complaint ==
On May 12, 2009, Pendergest-Holt was indicted by a Houston federal grand jury on two counts of obstructing a fraud investigation and conspiracy to obstruct justice. She was free on a $300,000 bond.

== Guilty plea ==
On June 21, 2012, Pendergest-Holt pleaded guilty before federal judge David Hittner to obstructing the SEC's investigation into the Stanford operation. She admitted that despite knowing that she was incapable of testifying about the vast majority of that portfolio, she agreed to testify before the SEC. She acknowledged that her eventual appearance and sworn testimony before the SEC was a stall tactic designed to frustrate the SEC's efforts to obtain important information about SIB's investment portfolio, and that it was an intentional effort to impede the SEC's investigation and help SIB continue operating. Prosecutors offered a deal that allowed her to plead to one count because she did not know about the fraud until early 2009—shortly before its collapse. She admitted that she withheld information about Tier III in order to give the firm "time to correct the disclosures, amend them, so we could fall into line."

On September 13, 2012, she was sentenced to three years in prison and three years of supervised release. Overcome by emotion, she apologized for trusting Stanford. "He didn't deserve my trust," she said. "And in so trusting, I harmed others." This statement angered prosecutors, who felt she was downplaying the seriousness of her crime. She asked Hittner for permission to self-report to prison in a month so she could arrange for her daughter's care. However, Hittner rejected that request and remanded her to custody immediately.

Pendergest-Holt, Federal Bureau of Prisons (BOP)#43550-279, was released from BOP custody on April 23, 2015.

The former head of Antigua and Barbuda’s Financial Services Regulatory Commission (FSRC), Leroy King, also involved in the Allen Stanford Ponzi Scheme fraud, was charged by the US authorities. Extradited to the US in November 2019 and pleaded guilty to obstructing a proceeding before the SEC and to conspiracy to obstruct a Commission proceeding in United States, in February 2021 was sentenced to 10 years in prison.

== Private life ==
Pendergest-Holt has a family home in Baldwyn, Mississippi with her husband, Jim Holt; they have one daughter. She attended Baldwyn High School in Baldwyn, Mississippi University for Women (majoring in mathematics), and the University of Mississippi (master's degree of science). She first met James Davis at the First Baptist Church in Baldwyn. A columnist from Memphis, Tennessee, described Pendergest-Holt as similar to a character from a work of Theodore Dreiser. On the witness stand at Allen Stanford's trial in Houston, Texas, on February 2, 2012, James Davis admitted to having an affair with Pendergest-Holt from 2001 until 2003.

The employees of Stanford Financial were a very tight-knit group that were bound together by family ties, leading to allegations of nepotism. Pendergest-Holt has a sister married to Ken Weeden, Stanford Financial Group's former managing director for investments and research. Pendergest-Holt's cousin Heather Sheppard was an "equity specialist" at the company and was also James Davis's secretary and lover.

== See also ==
- Ponzi scheme
- James M. Davis
- Mark Kuhrt
- Allen Stanford
