= Galleria Office Towers =

Office complex in Houston, Texas

Coordinates: 29.739°N 95.462°W

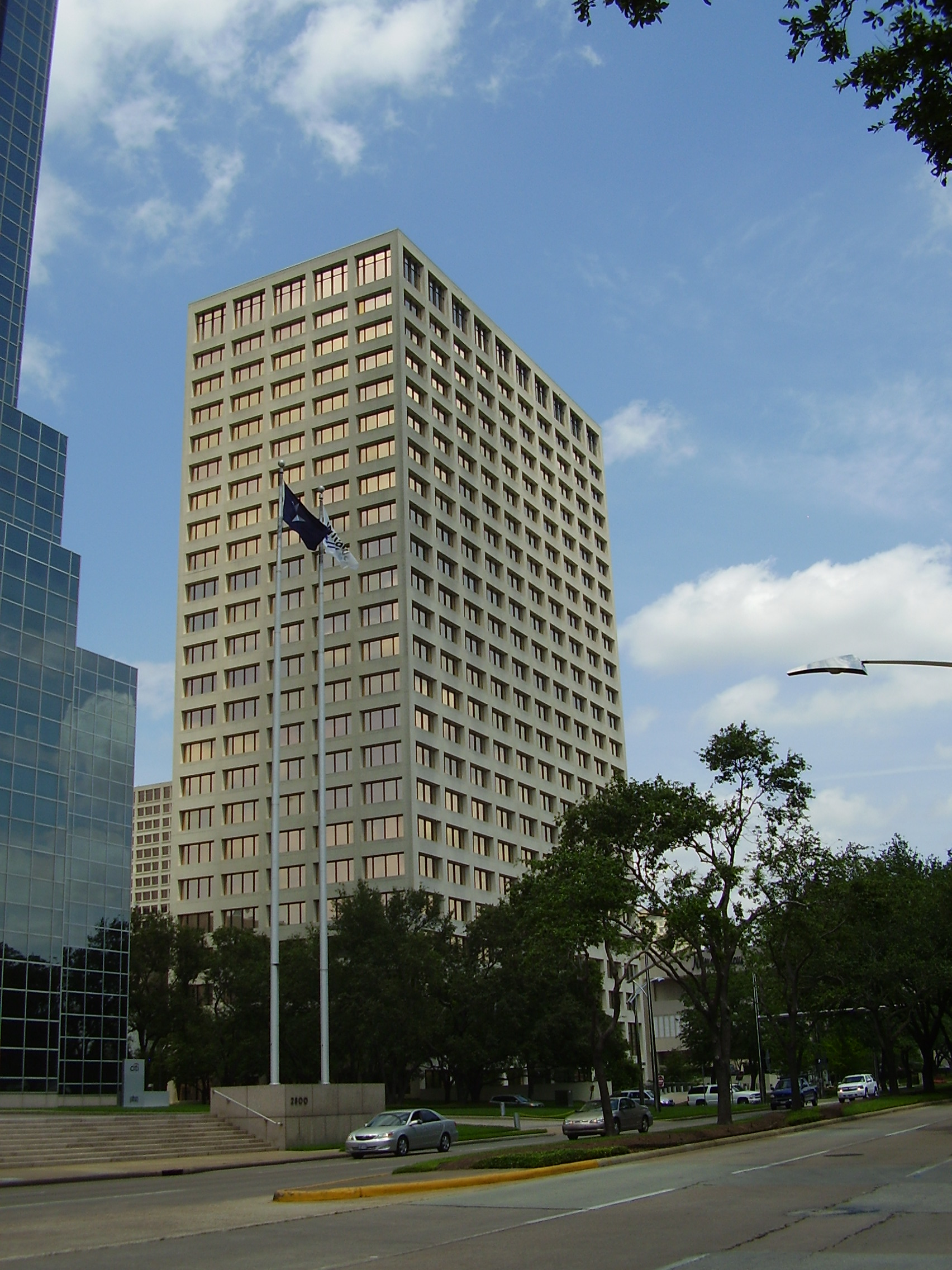
Galleria Tower I

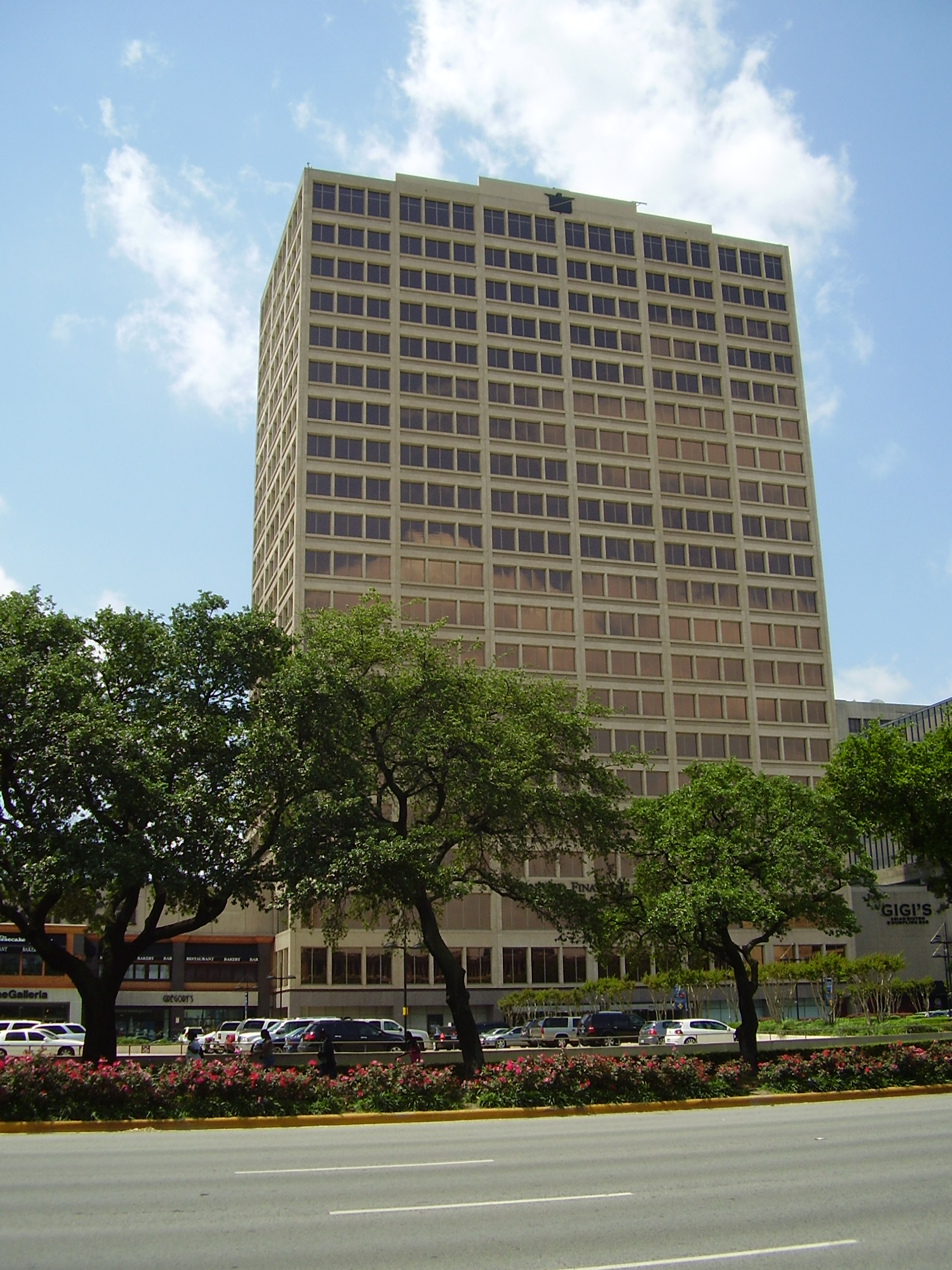
Galleria Tower II, then the headquarters of Stanford Financial Group

Galleria Office Towers is an office complex located on the site of The Galleria in the Uptown district of Houston, Texas, United States. The buildings, consisting of the Galleria Tower I, Galleria Tower II, and the Galleria Financial Center, are managed by Colville Office Properties.

The 25 floor Galleria Tower I, with 490,152 square feet (45,536.6 m^{2}) of space, is at 2700 Post Oak Boulevard. The 21 floor Galleria Tower II, with 320,359 square feet (29,762.3 m^{2}) of space, is at 5051 Westheimer Road. The 12 floor Galleria Financial Center, with 251,204 square feet (23,337.6 m^{2}) of space, is at 5065 and 5075 Westheimer Road.

== Tenants ==
Galleria Tower I

- CIGNA (Suite 700)
- Zehl & Associates, PC] Suite 1120

Galleria Tower II

- PEAK Performance Group Suite 1111 www.peakpg.com

== Gallery ==
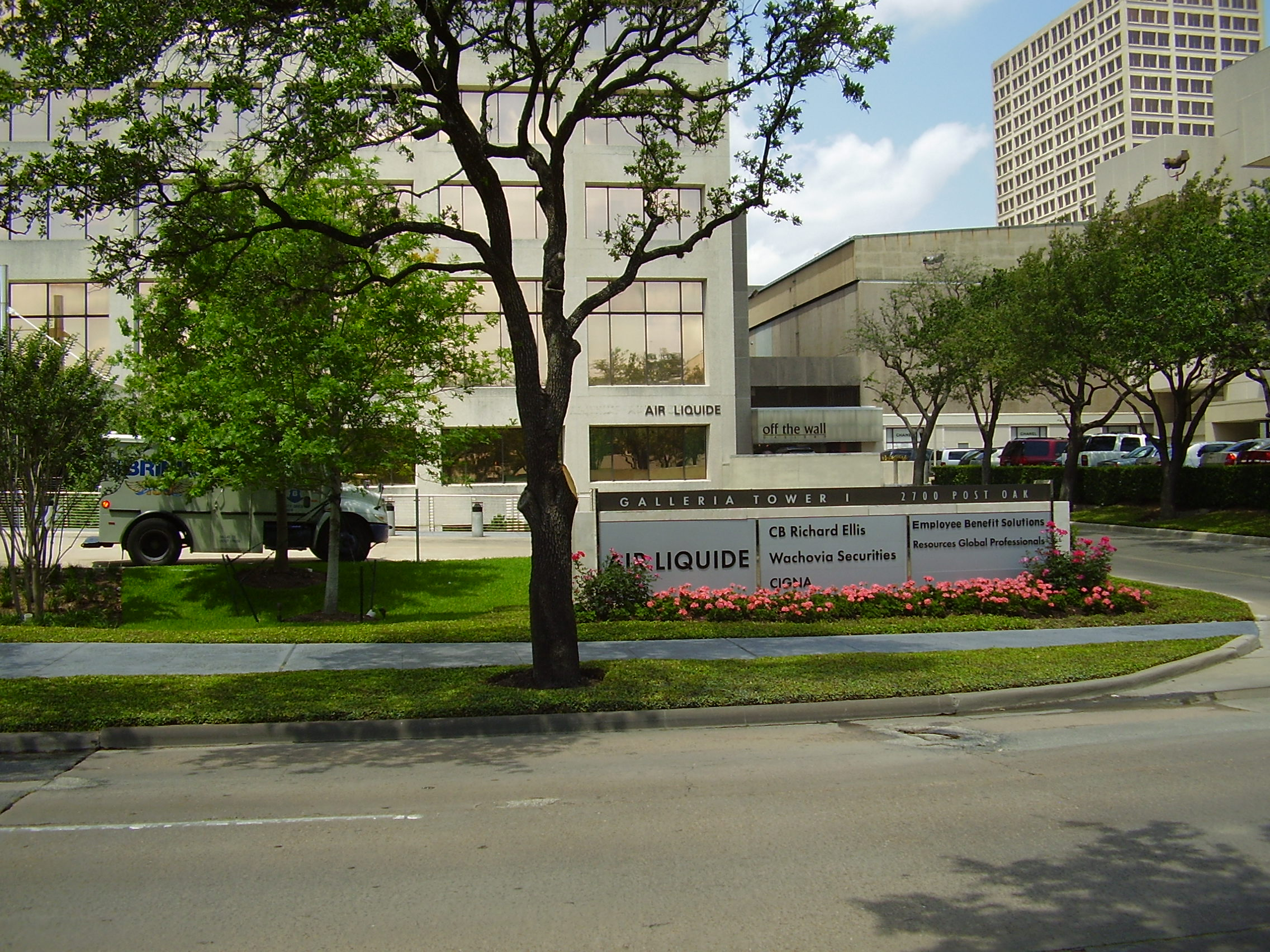
Base of Galleria Tower I

== See also ==
- The Galleria
- Uptown Houston
