= Janice Pereira =

British Virgin Islands judge

The Right Honourable Dame Janice M. Pereira DBE
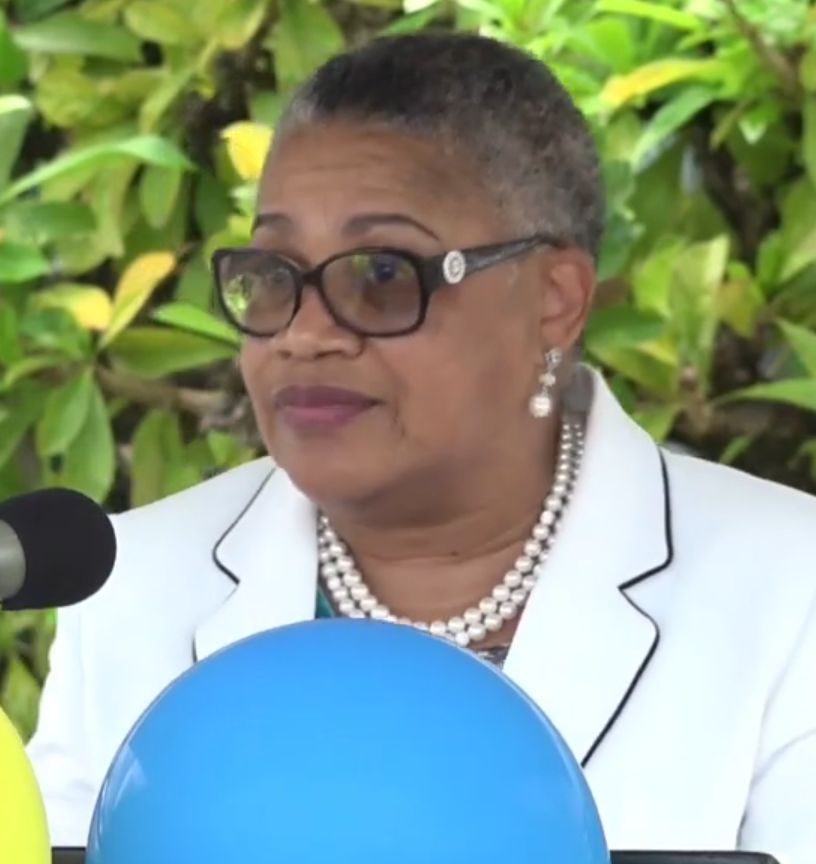
- Pereira in 2021

Chief Justice of the Eastern Caribbean Supreme Court
- In office 28 September 2012 – 5 May 2024
- Preceded by: Hugh Rawlins
- Succeeded by: Mario Michel

Personal details
- Born: Janice Mesadis George Virgin Gorda, British Virgin Islands
- Education: University of the West Indies, Norman Manley Law School
- Occupation: Judge
- Profession: Lawyer

Dame Janice Mesadis Pereira DBE PC (née George; formerly: George-Creque, Creque), was the Chief Justice of the Eastern Caribbean Supreme Court. She became the first female Chief Justice and the first person from the British Virgin Islands to become Chief Justice in 2012.

== Early life ==
She was born in Virgin Gorda in the British Virgin Islands. Pereira first graduated from the University of the West Indies at the Cave Hill Campus in Barbados with a law degree in honours in 1979 before completing her legal education certificate at Norman Manley Law School in Jamaica in 1981.

== Career ==
She was originally called to the Bar of the British Virgin Islands in 1981 after completing her legal certificate, and became a High Court judge in 2003. She was promoted to the Court of Appeal on 9 January 2009 before being appointed to the Chief Justice in 2012.

As Chief Justice of the Court, she was the supreme judicial officer of the courts of Anguilla, Antigua and Barbuda, the British Virgin Islands, Dominica, Grenada, Montserrat, Saint Kitts and Nevis, Saint Lucia, and Saint Vincent and the Grenadines. She was created a Dame Commander of the Order of the British Empire (DBE) in 2013.

On 28 August 2024, it was announced she would be appointed a Privy Councillor on 2 October, and sit on its Judicial Committee.

=== Supervisor of elections ===
Prior to joining the judiciary, as a practising lawyer Janice Pereira twice acted as supervisor for elections in the British Virgin Islands in the 1983 general election (under her maiden name) and in the 1986 general election (under her first married name, Janice George-Creque).

Political offices
Preceded by Hugh Anthony Rawlins	Chief Justice of the Eastern Caribbean Supreme Court; 2012 – 2024	Succeeded by Mario Michel (acting)
