= Margaret Price Findlay =

Chief Justice of the Eastern Caribbean Supreme Court
- Incumbent
- Assumed office 2025

Personal details
- Education: University of the West Indies

Margaret A. Price Findlay is a Trinidad and Tobago lawyer and judge. She has worked primarily in the British Virgin Islands, and since 2025 she has been a Chief Justice of the Eastern Caribbean Supreme Court.

== Biography ==
Price Findlay earned a bachelor of laws degree from the University of the West Indies. From 1987 to 1991 she worked as a lawyer in Trinidad and Tobago, and in 1991 she moved to the British Virgin Islands, where she worked as a lawyer, setting up the firm Price Findlay & Co in 1995. Also in 1995, she worked as a magistrate in the courts of the British Virgin Islands.

In 2009, the Judicial and Legal Services Commission of the Caribbean Community appointed her as a High Court Judges of the Eastern Caribbean Supreme Court, with the assignment to reside in and hear cases in Grenada.

In May 2025, Findlay was sworn in as the acting Chief Justice of the Eastern Caribbean Supreme Court. She is the first jurist from the Organisation of Eastern Caribbean States to serve on the Eastern Caribbean Supreme Court. Findlay is the first woman from Trinidad and Tobago to be appointed chief justice. The position was formalized when she was formally appointed Chief Justice on 9 April 2026.
