= Bank of Antigua =

- Type: Subsidiary
- Industry: Financial; Commercial banks
- Founded: 1981; 45 years ago
- Headquarters: St. John's, Antigua
- Key people: Allen Stanford
- Parent: Stanford Financial Group
- Website: bankofantigua.com

Bank of Antigua was an Antigua-based bank that was owned by the Stanford Financial Group and was central to the Ponzi scheme run by Allen Stanford. It was originally formed on the 10 February 1981 in St. John's. When the local Bank of Antigua ran into difficulties, Stanford stepped in during 1990 to take it over at the request of Prime Minister Lester Bird.

The bank was located near Antigua's international airport, alongside Stanford's other holdings, including the Stanford Cricket Ground and the headquarters of Stanford International Bank, which claimed $51 billion in deposits and assets under management and more than 70,000 clients in 140 countries.

== Stanford fraud ==
In the late 1990s, the Antiguan government formed a banking advisory board and appointed Stanford himself as a member, despite the board also overseeing his own bank - a move that alarmed American authorities who saw an inherent conflict of interest. The project was funded by money lent or granted by Stanford.

The fraud had been flagged as early as January 2009 by financial analyst Alex Dalmady, who published an article titled Duck Tales in VenEconomy Monthly after examining the bank's public records for a friend considering an investment. Dalmady identified several warning signs, including certificates of deposit offering returns of 7,5%, far above the prevailing U.S. rate of 4-5%, and a compound annual deposit growth rate of 34% between 1999 and 2008, with total deposits growing from $624 million to $8,4 billion over that period.

When the Ponzi scheme was exposed in 2009, the bank was taken over by the Eastern Caribbean Central Bank (ECCB) on 20 February 2009. When the U.S. Securities and Exchange Commission announced its charges against Stanford, small investors staged a run on the Bank of Antigua the following day. Around 200 customers queued in heat to withdraw their money, and Bank of Antigua cheques were refused at local supermarkets.

Local clients were told that processing of withdrawal requests could take several days. Stanford also announced a two-month moratorium on early redemptions of certificates of deposit, telling employees the measure was temporary.

The Financial Services Regulatory Commission of Antigua and Barbuda appointed Nigel Hamilton-Smith and Peter Wastell of Britain-based Vantis Business Recovery Services as receivers to manage Stanford International Bank and Stanford Trust Company. Stanford was the second-largest employer on the island, after the government, with around 1,300 employees in Antigua alone.

== Nationalisation ==
On February 23, the Eastern Caribbean Central Bank and the Government of Antigua and Barbuda announced the creation of Eastern Caribbean Amalgamated Investment Company (ECAIC), a new entity combining indigenous banks within the Eastern Caribbean Currency Union - including the Antigua Commercial Bank, St Kitts-Nevis-Anguilla National Bank, Eastern Caribbean Financial Holdings, National Commercial Bank of St Vincent and the Grenadines, and National Bank of Dominica, - the Government of Antigua and Barbuda, and East Caribbean Financial Holding Company Limited, with the government receiving a 25% stake and the Antigua Commercial Bank 15%. PricewaterhouseCoopers was engaged by the ECCB to carry out a valuation of the bank.

The bank was renamed the Eastern Caribbean Amalgamated Bank by the ECCB and was disposed of in November 2011.

== Aftermath ==
In the aftermath, Antiguan authorities strengthened the regulatory environment by retraining staff, expanding the legal powers of supervisory bodies such as the Financial Services Regulatory Commission and the Financial Intelligence Unit, and enforcing existing legislation more strictly.

== Legal disputes ==
In February 2013, the Official Stanford Investors Committee filed a lawsuit against Antigua and Barbuda, the Eastern Caribbean Central Bank, and 23 former Stanford Financial Group executives, accusing them of aiding the fraud. The committee sought repayment of at least $90 million in loans that Stanford had made to Antigua and accused the country's officials of having actively shielded Stanford's scheme from regulatory scrutiny.

The investors argued that the distribution of the Bank of Antigua's ownership to the Antiguan government and other Caribbean banks constituted a second misappropriation of funds, and that the bank's value should instead be distributed to Stanford's victims and creditors. The lawsuit also highlighted a separate conflict of interest: the head of the ECCB's monetary council at the time of the bank's nationalisation in 2009 was Antiguan Finance Minister Errol Cort, who had previously served as Stanford's personal attorney.

Antigua and Barbuda's Attorney General, Justin Simon, rejected the allegations, stating that the ECCB had, in fact, injected EC$89 million (approximately US$32,9 million) to save the bank from collapse and that no expropriation had taken place. Meanwhile, the Stanford Victims Coalition launched a campaign called Anti-Crime, Anti-Antigua, urging international travel professionals and investors to boycott hotels, cruises and investments in Antigua and Barbuda.
