= James M. Davis =

Former chief financial officer of Stanford Financial Group

- Born: 1948 (age 77–78)
- Occupation: Former CFO of Stanford Financial Group
- Known for: Involvement in the Stanford Financial Ponzi scheme
- Criminal status: Released

James M. Davis (born 1948) is the former chief financial officer of Stanford Financial Group. On August 27, 2009 he pleaded guilty to charges of fraud and obstruction of Justice in relation to a $7 billion investment fraud Ponzi scheme allegedly run by the company. On January 22, 2013, Davis was sentenced to five years in jail for his part in the Stanford Financial fraud. He admitted that he was aware of Allen Stanford's misuse of funds and he assisted in keeping the misuse of funds quiet. Davis was also sentenced to three years of supervised release and had a judgment of $1 billion placed against him. He finished serving his sentence at Memphis FCI and was released on July 24, 2017. The former head of Antigua and Barbuda’s Financial Services Regulatory Commission (FSRC), Leroy King, also involved in the Allen Stanford Ponzi Scheme fraud, was charged by the US authorities. Extradited to the US in November 2019 and pleaded guilty to obstructing a proceeding before the SEC and to conspiracy to obstruct a Commission proceeding in United States, in February 2021 was sentenced to 10 years in prison.

== See also ==
- Ponzi scheme
- Allen Stanford
- Gilbert Lopez
- Mark Kuhrt
- Laura Pendergest-Holt
- Stanford Financial Group
