= Birnie Stephenson-Brooks =

Guyanese lawyer and judge

High Court Judge of the Eastern Caribbean Supreme Court
- Incumbent
- Assumed office 2009
- Appointed by: Judicial and Legal Services Commission of the Caribbean Community

M. E. Birnie Stephenson-Brooks is a Guyanese lawyer and judge who has worked in a number of Commonwealth countries in the Caribbean.

== Education and career ==
Stephenson-Brooks was educated at the University of Guyana and the University of the West Indies. From 1987 to 1991, she worked as a lawyer in Guyana. In 1991 and 1992, she moved to Saint Kitts and Nevis and was legal counsel to the Government of Nevis. In 1992, she moved to Anguilla, where she worked as a lawyer until 2000 (she became the first female to serve as President of the Anguilla Bar Association in 1996), when she moved to the British Virgin Islands and worked as a lawyer. She moved back to Anguilla in 2002 to practice and in 2004 was appointed as a court magistrate, court registrar, and head of the Judicial Department of the government. She held these positions until 2009.

In 2009, Stephenson-Brooks was appointed by the Judicial and Legal Services Commission of the Caribbean Community to be a High Court Judge of the Eastern Caribbean Supreme Court; she was assigned to reside in and hear cases from the Commonwealth of Dominica.
