= William Ogburn House =

Historic house in Iowa, United States

- U.S. National Register of Historic Places
- Location within Iowa Location within the United States
- Location: 1½ miles north of East Peru
- Coordinates: 41°15′03″N 93°55′19″W
- Area: less than one acre
- Built: 1865
- Built by: David Harris
- MPS: Legacy in Stone: The Settlement Era of Madison County, Iowa TR
- NRHP reference No.: 87001660
- Added to NRHP: September 29, 1987

The William Ogburn House is a historic ruin located north of East Peru, Iowa, United States. This 1½-story limestone structure is an early example of a vernacular farm house, and the only known saltbox residence known to exist in Madison County. It is attributed to David Harris who used innovative design variations that were not used by other local masons. The stone of the main facade is composed of finished cut quarry faced stone laid two against one with broken bond within courses. The other elevations are composed of rubble limestone. It also features quoins and jambs of finished cut quarry faced stone. The house suffered a fire so only the stone walls remain. It was listed on the National Register of Historic Places in 1987.
