= Caribbean Star Airlines =

Airline

Caribbean Star
IATA	ICAO	Call sign
8B	GFI	CARIB STAR
- Founded: 2001
- Ceased operations: June 15, 2007 (merged with LIAT)
- Hubs: VC Bird International Airport
- Focus cities: Grantley Adams International Airport
- Frequent-flyer program: Star Miles
- Fleet size: 11
- Destinations: 16
- Parent company: Caribbean Star Airlines Limited
- Headquarters: Antigua
- Key people: Allen Stanford (founder)
- Website: Former website

Caribbean Star Airlines was an airline based in Antigua and Barbuda. It operated scheduled passenger services in conjunction with Leeward Islands Air Transport (LIAT) to destinations in the eastern Caribbean. Its main base was VC Bird International Airport, St John's. The company slogan was A Whole New Altitude.

== History ==
The airline was incorporated in Antigua in January 2000 and started operations with the Dash 8 regional turboprop in June 2000. It was owned by Texan businessman Allen Stanford, through his company Stanford Financial Group. Its sister airline, Caribbean Sun Airlines Inc., launched its maiden flight three years later. The two were affiliated but separate companies.

In January 2007, the airline announced an intended merger with LIAT, and they entered into a commercial alliance, flying a combined schedule. All flights were marketed under LIAT's airline code, although the airlines continued to operate separately using their own air operator certificates until the merger was completed. The merger was finalized on June 15, 2007, with LIAT becoming the surviving carrier.

== Destinations ==
The Caribbean Star 20/20 Stanford Cup logo plane in Princess Juliana International Airport

Caribbean Star Airlines operated the following international scheduled services, as of November 2006, until its merger with LIAT:

=== North America ===
Caribbean

- Antigua
  - (V.C. Bird International Airport) hub
- Barbados
  - (Grantley Adams International Airport)
- British Virgin Islands
  - Tortola – (Terrance B. Lettsome International Airport)
- Dominica –
  - (Melville Hall Airport)
- Guyana
  - Georgetown – (Cheddi Jagan International Airport)
- Grenada
  - (Maurice Bishop International Airport)
- Netherlands Antilles
  - Curaçao – (Hato International Airport)
  - Sint Maarten – (Princess Juliana International Airport)
- Trinidad & Tobago
  - Tobago – (Crown Point International Airport)
  - Port of Spain – (Piarco International Airport)
- Saint Kitts & Nevis
  - St. Kitts – (Robert L. Bradshaw International Airport)
- Saint Lucia
  - Saint Lucia – (George F. L. Charles Airport)
- Saint Vincent & the Grenadines
  - St.Vincent – (E.T. Joshua Airport)

== Fleet ==
The Caribbean Star Airlines fleet consisted of the following aircraft as of March 2007:

- 11 Bombardier Dash 8 Q300 (Five aircraft transferred to LIAT)

Previously owned aircraft consists of:

- 3 Bombardier Dash 8 Q100
