= Hugh Rawlins =

Former Chief Justice of the Eastern Caribbean Supreme Court

Sir Hugh Anthony Rawlins is the former Chief Justice of the Eastern Caribbean Supreme Court; he succeeded Brian George Keith Alleyne in the position in 2008 and served until 2012. He had previously served as High Court Judge on the Court, residing in and hearing cases from Saint Kitts and Nevis in that capacity since 2005.

As Chief Justice of the Court, Rawlins was the supreme judicial officer of the courts of Anguilla, Antigua and Barbuda, the British Virgin Islands, Dominica, Grenada, Montserrat, Saint Kitts and Nevis, Saint Lucia, and Saint Vincent and the Grenadines.

== Early life ==
Rawlins is native of Saint Kitts and Nevis, having been born on Nevis. From 1989 to 1995, he was the Solicitor-General of Saint Kitts and Nevis. Prior to his appointment to the Eastern Caribbean Supreme Court, Rawlins had been a magistrate in Saint Kitts and Nevis.

Preceded by Brian George Keith Alleyne	Chief Justice of the Eastern Caribbean Supreme Court; 2008–2012	Succeeded by Janice Pereira
