= Tamara Gill =

Grenadian lawyer and judge

The Honourable Tamara Gill

High Court Judge of the Eastern Caribbean Supreme Court
- Incumbent
- Assumed office 1 January 2023
- Appointed by: Judicial and Legal Services Commission of the Caribbean Community

Chief Magistrate of Grenada
- In office 2009–2020

Tamara Gill is a Grenadian lawyer and judge who serves as an Eastern Caribbean Supreme Court High Court Judge in Saint Kitts and Nevis.

== Education ==
In 1990, Gill graduated from the University of the West Indies Faculty of Law, and in 1992 from the Hugh Wooding Law School.

== Legal career ==
In 1992, Gill joined the Grenadian Attorney General's Chambers as a Crown Counsel and in 1997, she became a Senior Crown Counsel.

In 1999, Gill became a magistrate, and from 2009 until 2020, was Chief Magistrate of Grenada. Gill served as an acting Master of the Eastern Caribbean Supreme Court (ECSC) from September to December 2019, January to April 2020, and May to July 2020. In September 2020, she was fully appointed a Master of the ECSC.

On 1 January 2023, Gill became a High Court Judge of the ECSC to Saint Kitts and Nevis.
