= Eastern Caribbean Supreme Court =

Caribbean court system established under the Organisation of Eastern Caribbean States

- Established: 27 February 1967
- Jurisdiction: List of countries: Antigua and Barbuda; Dominica; Grenada; Saint Kitts and Nevis; Saint Lucia; Saint Vincent and the Grenadines; Anguilla; British Virgin Islands; Montserrat
- Location: Castries, Saint Lucia (Headquarters)
- Motto: Fiat Justitia ("Let there be Justice")
- Composition method: Appointed by the Monarch (Chief Justice) and the Judicial and Legal Services Commission (Other Judges)
- Authorised by: Supreme Court Order
- Appeals to: Judicial Committee of the Privy Council; Caribbean Court of Justice
- Appeals from: Magistrates' Courts; High Courts
- Language: English
- Website: www.eccourts.org

Chief Justice
- Currently: Margaret Price Findlay (acting)
- Since: 5 May 2025

The Eastern Caribbean Supreme Court (ECSC) is a superior court of record for the Organisation of Eastern Caribbean States (OECS), including six independent states: Antigua and Barbuda, the Commonwealth of Dominica, Grenada, Saint Kitts and Nevis, Saint Lucia, Saint Vincent and the Grenadines and three British Overseas Territories (Anguilla, British Virgin Islands, and Montserrat). It has unlimited jurisdiction in each member State.

== History ==
The ECSC was established in 1967 by the West Indies Associated States Supreme Court Order No. 223 of 1967. In relation to Grenada, the Court is styled "the Supreme Court of Grenada and the West Indies Associated States". See section 105 of the Grenada Constitution.

== Functions ==
The functions of the ECSC are as follows:

- To interpret and apply the laws of the various member states of the OECS;
- To decide cases of both civil and criminal matters;
- To hear appeals.

== Appeals from the ECSC ==
Appeals from the ECSC can be lodged in defined cases to the Judicial Committee of the Privy Council in the United Kingdom (in cases from Antigua and Barbuda, Grenada, Saint Kitts and Nevis, Saint Vincent and the Grenadines, Anguilla, British Virgin Islands, and Montserrat) or the Caribbean Court of Justice in Trinidad and Tobago (for cases from Dominica and Saint Lucia).

== Composition ==
=== Judges ===
To be a judge or master of the Eastern Caribbean Supreme Court, a person must have served as a judge in a Commonwealth jurisdiction or be qualified to act as a lawyer in a Commonwealth jurisdiction. An appointee does not need to be a national, judge, or lawyer of a country within the jurisdiction of the Court. The Chief Justice is appointed by the King of the United Kingdom by Letters Patent as advised by the Lord Chancellor. Other judges are appointed on behalf of the King by the Judicial and Legal Services Commission.

High Court Judges and Masters are assigned to reside in and hear cases from a specific member state. It is common for judges to be asked to work in countries other than their home state. Judges are only occasionally assigned to reside in Montserrat and Anguilla—because of the small population of these countries, judges from the other jurisdictions hear cases that arise from these two jurisdictions. The Court of Appeal is itinerant and travels to the various countries to hear appeals.

Judges have life tenure but Justices of Appeal must retire when they are 65 and High Court Judges must retire when they are 62. Extensions of up to three years may be granted by the Judicial and Legal Services Commission only if all of the states agree to such an extension.

=== Current composition ===
| Name | Home state | Position | Appointed to current position |
|---|---|---|---|
| Margaret Price Findlay | Trinidad and Tobago | Chief Justice | 2026 (acting since 2025) |
| Gerard Farara | British Virgin Islands | Justice of Appeal [Ag.] | 2020 |
| Trevor Ward | Trinidad and Tobago | Justice of Appeal | 2022 |
| Margaret Price Findlay | Trinidad and Tobago | Justice of Appeal | 2022 |
| Vicki Ann Ellis | Saint Lucia | Justice of Appeal | 2022 |
| Eddy Ventose | Saint Lucia | Justice of Appeal | 2024 |
| Esco Henry | Montserrat | Justice of Appeal | 2024 |

==== High Court Judges ====
Anguilla

- Ermin Moise

Antigua and Barbuda

- Nicola Petra Byer
- Ann-Marie Smith
- Jan Drysdale
- Rene Williams
- Tunde Ademola Bakre [Ag.]

Dominica

- Colin Williams
- Jacqueline Josiah-Graham

Grenada

- Paula Gilford
- Raulston Glasgow
- Shawn Innocent
- Agnes Actie

Montserrat

- Dale Francis Fitzpatrick

Saint Kitts and Nevis

- Iain Charles Morley, KC
- Patrick Thompson Jr. (Nevis Circuit)
- Tamara Gill

Saint Lucia

- Wynante Adrien-Roberts
- Cadie St. Rose- Albertini
- Vivian Georgis Taylor-Alexander
- Kimberly Cenac-Phulgence
- Rohan Phillip
- Alvin Pariagsingh
- Rechanne Browne

Saint Vincent and the Grenadines

- Brian Cottle
- Birnie Stephenson-Brooks
- Rickie Burnett
- Richard Floyd [Ag.]
- Gertel Thom [Ag.]

British Virgin Islands

- Angelica Teelucksingh
- Sonya Young
- Gerhard Wallbank [Ag.]
- Paul Webster [Ag.]

=== Chief Justices ===
| Name | Home state | Dates |
|---|---|---|
| Allen Montgomery Lewis | Saint Lucia | 1967–1972 |
| P. Cecil Lewis (acting) | Saint Vincent and the Grenadines | 1972–1975 |
| Maurice Davis | Saint Kitts and Nevis | 1975–1980 |
| Neville Peterkin | Grenada | 1981–1983 |
| Neville Berridge (acting) | Saint Kitts and Nevis | 1983–1984 |
| Lascelles Robotham | Jamaica | 1984–1991 |
| Vincent Floissac | Saint Lucia | 1991–1996 |
| Charles Michael Dennis Byron | Saint Kitts and Nevis | 1996–2004 (acting 1996–1999) |
| Adrian Saunders (acting) | Saint Vincent and the Grenadines | 2004–2005 |
| Brian George Keith Alleyne (acting) | Dominica | 2005–2008 |
| Hugh Anthony Rawlins | Saint Kitts and Nevis | 2008–2012 |
| Janice Pereira | British Virgin Islands | 2012–2024 |
| Mario Michel (acting) | Saint Lucia | 2024–2025 |
| Margaret Price Findlay | Trinidad and Tobago | 2026–present (acting 2025–2026) |

== Location ==
The Headquarters of the ECSC is in Castries, Saint Lucia, where it is located on the second floor of the Heraldine Rock Building, Block B, on the Waterfront. The building houses the Justices of Appeal's chambers, the Court of Appeal Registry, the Judicial Education Institute, Library, and the Administrative Services.

In addition, there are Court Offices in the nine Member States, which house the chambers of the High Court Judges and the offices of the High Court Registry. Each High Court Registry is headed by a legally trained Registrar who provides the necessary administrative and legal support for the functioning of the High Court.

== Notable people ==
- David Courtenay Harris, High Court Judge

== See also ==
- Organisation of Eastern Caribbean States
- Judicial Committee of the Privy Council (JCPC)
- Caribbean Court of Justice
