= FRP Advisory =

British firm specialising in corporate restructuring

- Company type: Limited company, subsidiary of FRP Advisory Group plc
- Traded as: AIM: FRP
- Industry: Professional services
- Founders: Jeremy French, Geoff Rowley
- Headquarters: London, United Kingdom
- Number of employees: 800
- Website: www.frpadvisory.com

FRP Advisory is a business advisory firm based in the United Kingdom, providing restructuring, corporate finance, debt advisory, forensic accounting and financial advisory and is one of the UK’s largest specialists in the area of corporate restructuring.

The firm was formed in June 2010 by Jeremy French and Geoff Rowley, whose initials form the basis of the name (French Rowley Partners). The business has more than 800 staff including 102 partners and operates from 33 locations across England, Scotland, Ireland and Wales, with one further office in Limassol, Cyprus, and another based in the Isle of Man. The business is a wholly owned subsidiary of FRP Advisory Group plc.

FRP Advisory is a member of the Insolvency Practitioners Association (IPA), Association of Business Recovery Professionals (R3), ICAEW, ACCA and the Turnaround Management Association (TMA).

== History ==
The firm was formed in June 2010 to undertake a management buyout of the Business Recovery Services division of Vantis plc. FRP did not make a cash payment for the business, but took on £11 million of Vantis' debt.

In March 2020, FRP Advisory Group PLC listed on the Alternative Investments Market (AIM) of the London Stock Exchange, with a market capitalisation on admission of £190m.

== Stanford International Bank ==
Former Vantis executives Nigel Hamilton-Smith and Peter Wastell were the joint liquidators of Stanford International Bank Limited and Stanford Trust Company Limited, a high-profile appointment which was reported as contributing to the collapse of Vantis. Hamilton-Smith and Wastell transferred to FRP Advisory and continued to act on the liquidation, and FRP Advisory fought to have them reinstated as liquidators of Stanford after a court decision to remove them, but the Eastern Caribbean Court of Appeal confirmed their removal in May 2011, passing the case to Grant Thornton.
