= Vicki Ann Ellis =

Saint Lucian lawyer and judge

High Court Judge of the Eastern Caribbean Supreme Court
- Incumbent
- Assumed office 2012

Personal details
- Education: University of the West Indies (LL.B.); University of London (LL.M.)

Vicki Ann Ellis is a Saint Lucian lawyer and judge. She has been a High Court Judge of the Eastern Caribbean Supreme Court since 2012.

Ellis earned a Bachelor of Laws degree from the University of the West Indies. She worked as a lawyer in Saint Lucia from 1996 to 2003, including several years as Crown Counsel. In 2003, she moved to the Cayman Islands, where she was the Deputy Solicitor-General, a position she held until 2012. She earned an LL.M. degree from the University of London in 2005.

In March 2012, the Judicial and Legal Services Commission of the Caribbean Community appointed Ellis as a High Court Judge of the Eastern Caribbean Supreme Court; she was assigned to reside in and hear cases from Grenada. In September 2012, she was transferred to the High Court in the British Virgin Islands.
