= The Galleria =

Shopping mall in Houston, Texas, U.S.

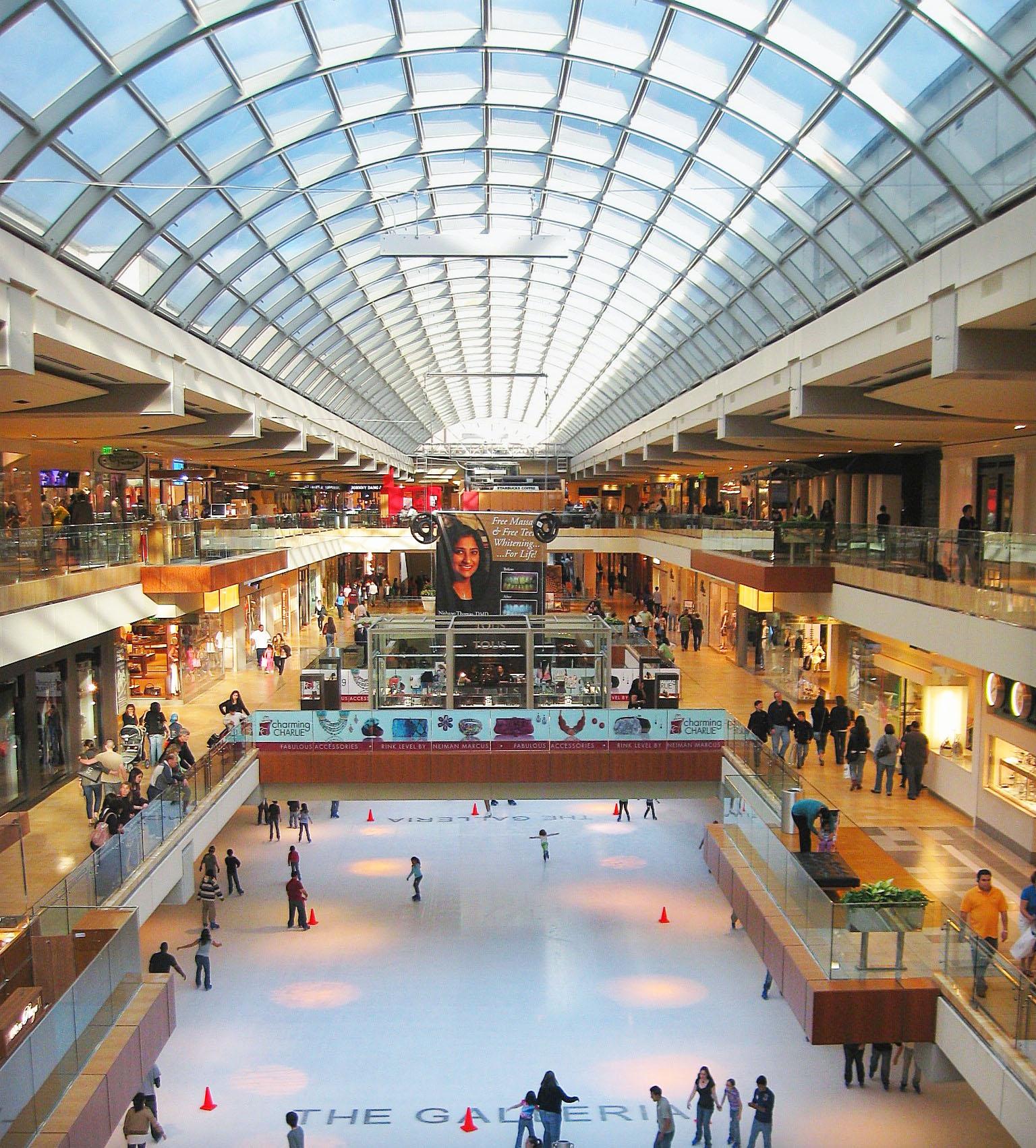
- The Galleria main hall showing the ice rink and large skylight
- Location: Uptown District, Houston, Texas, United States
- Coordinates: 29.7407°N 95.4636°W
- Address: 5085 Westheimer Road
- Opened: November 16, 1970; 55 years ago
- Developer: Hines Interests Limited Partnership
- Manager: Simon Property Group
- Owner: Simon Property Group
- Num. of stores: 400+
- Num. of anchor tenants: 8
- Floor area: 2,400,838 square feet (223,045.1 m^{2})
- Floors: 4
- Public transit: METRO Routes 20, 82, 433
- Website: Official website

The Galleria (stylized theGalleria and also known as the Houston Galleria) is an upscale mixed-use urban development and shopping mall located in the Uptown District of Houston, Texas, United States. The development consists of a retail complex, the Galleria Office Towers complex, two Westin hotels, and a private health club. The office towers and hotels are separately owned and managed from the mall. It features Macy's, Nordstrom, Neiman Marcus, and Saks Fifth Avenue.

With 3 million square feet (280,000 m^{2}) of space that includes 2,400,838 square feet (223,045.1 m^{2}) of gross leasable area with 400 stores, the Galleria is the largest mall in Texas and tied as the third largest shopping mall in the United States.

== History ==
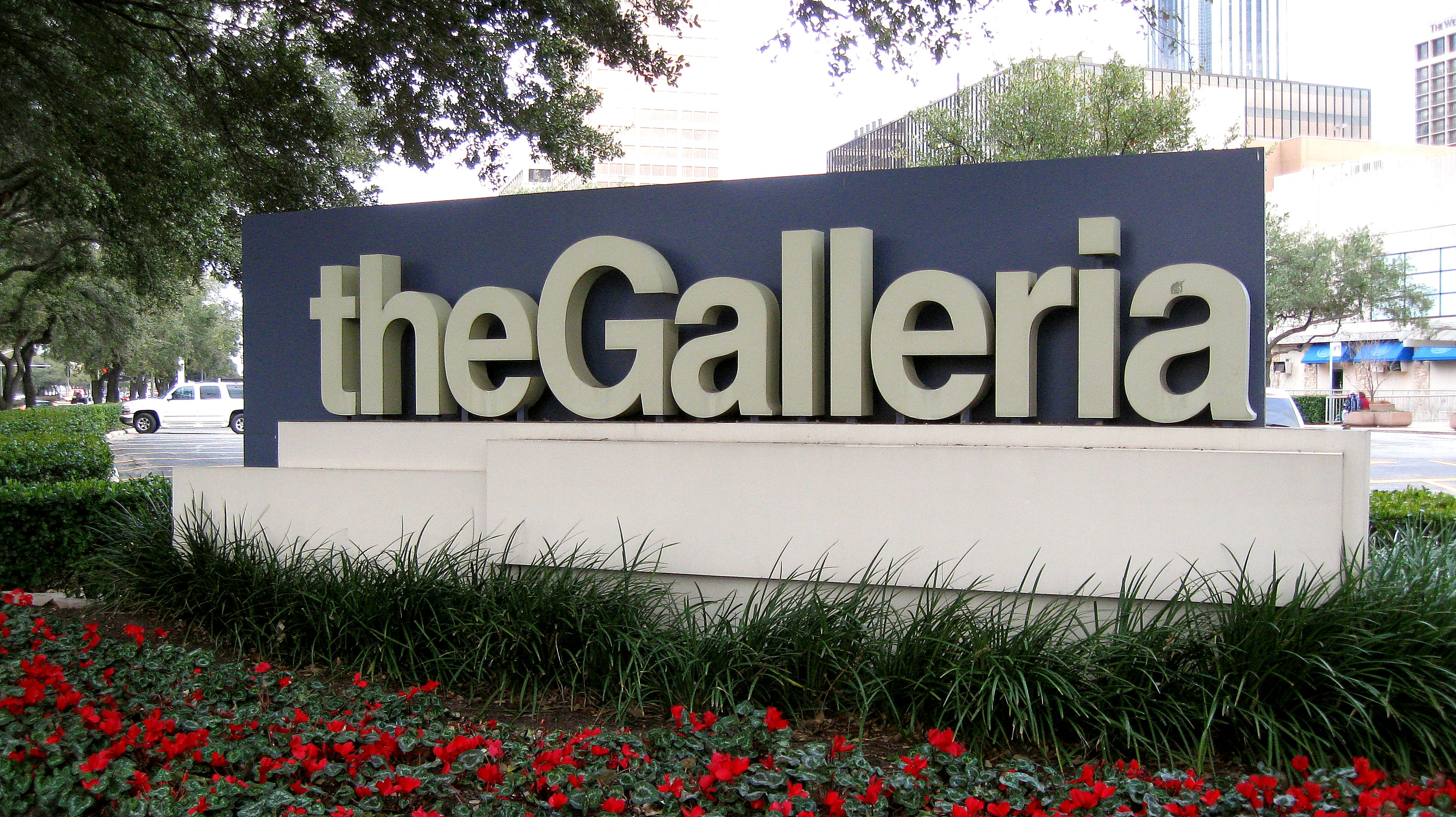
Exterior sign in 2010

The idea of an indoor shopping center with a hotel was envisioned in the 1940s by oilman Glenn H. McCarthy, where a second phase was to include the Shamrock Hotel; this concept was scrapped right after the Hilton Hotel franchise took over the Shamrock in 1955. Glenn H. McCarthy's abandoned concept would influence Gerald Hines in the late 1960s.

Gerald D. Hines developed the Galleria. The Neiman Marcus anchor store opened first, on January 28, 1969. The mall itself opened on November 16, 1970. The new shopping center was modeled after the Galleria Vittorio Emanuele II in Milan, borrowing, as its most distinctive architectural feature, a glazed barrel vault spanning the central axis of the mall. The mall opened with 600,000 ft² (56,000 m²) of retail space. The original skylights, which graced a large, floor-level, ice rink open year-round, had three hanging chandeliers. A connected 400-room hotel was opened in September 1971, the Houston Oaks Hotel (now The Westin Oaks Houston).

The first expansion, Galleria II, began in 1975 and opened on June 17, 1977. It added 360,000 ft² (33,000 m²) of retail space on two levels, Lord & Taylor and Frost Bros. anchor stores, office space (known as the Galleria Financial Center since the early 1990s). A second hotel also opened as part of Galleria II on November 18, 1977, the 500-room Galleria Plaza Hotel (now The Westin Galleria Houston). Marshall Field's joined the mall in 1979, in a store designed by noted architect Philip Johnson. In 1986, a second major expansion, Galleria III, opened with a new wing to the west of Marshall Field's, anchored by Macy's. Access to Galleria III from the main mall was through the Marshall Field's store limiting the success of the new expansion. Subsequent solutions to the problem with signage and a bypass through the parking garage did not succeed in changing this issue. This brought the mall to almost 1.6 million ft².

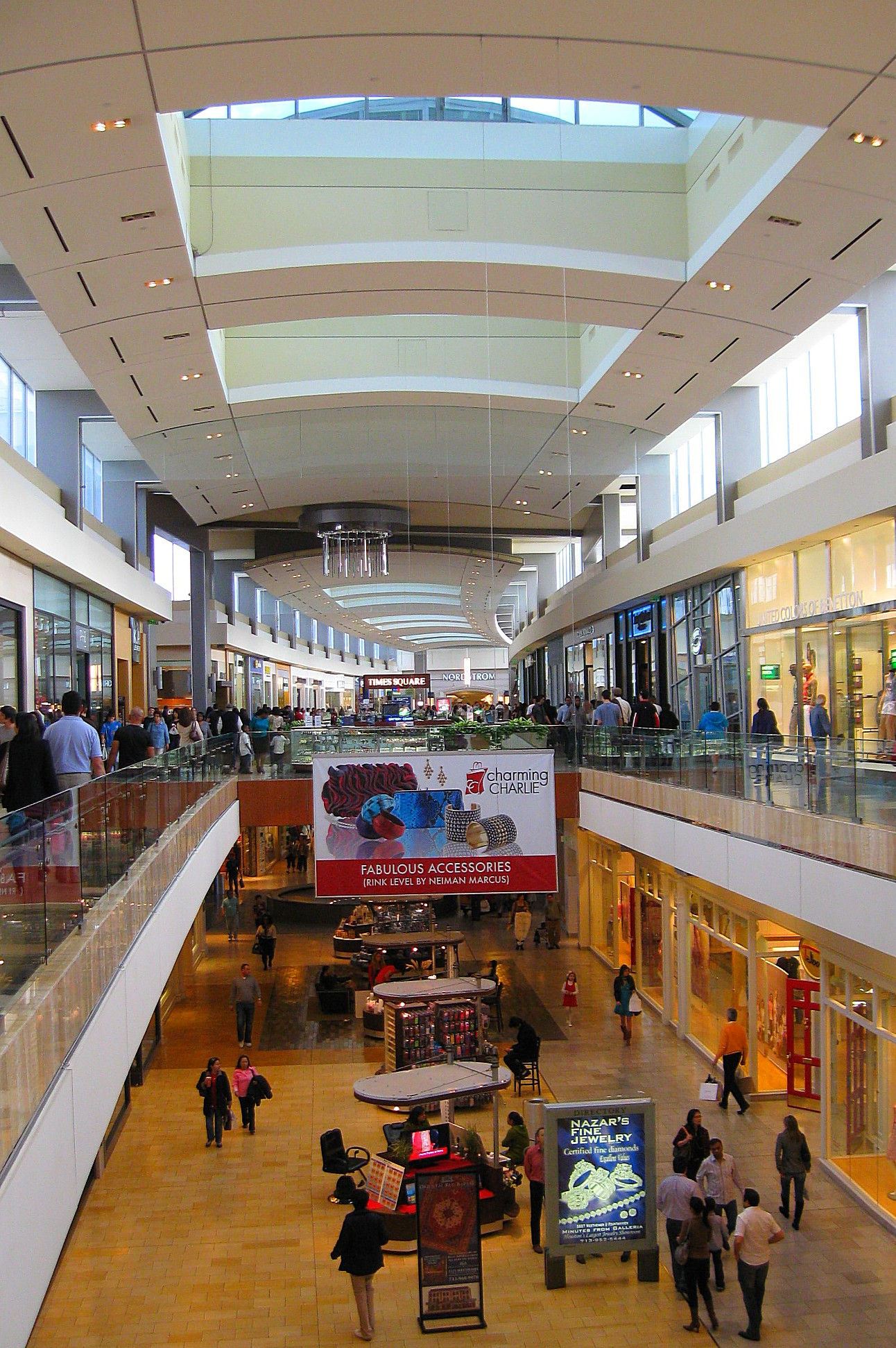
Galleria IV expansion

In February 1989, the Galleria was 93% occupied, making it the mall with the fifth highest percentage of occupied space in Houston.

In 1996, Dayton-Hudson Corporation (now Target Corporation), parent company of Marshall Field's, exited the Texas market and sold its Marshall Field's Texas stores. The San Antonio location was sold to Macy's, and three Houston and Dallas stores were sold to Saks Fifth Avenue. Saks Fifth Avenue would relocate its Post Oak Boulevard location to the Galleria as a flagship location after extensive renovations. The new Saks Fifth Avenue opened in 1997.

The Song “Dilbar” by Alka Yagnik from the movie Sirf Tum (1999) was recorded here in the rotating waterfall, tower, and fountain. Hines Interests sold the mall in 1999 to a partnership of Urban Shopping Centers, Inc. and institutional funds advised by Walton Street Capital, LLC. The Walton Street affiliated funds separately purchased the office and hotel buildings at this time. Urban, in turn, was purchased by Netherlands-headquartered real estate investment group Rodamco North America, N.V. in 2000. Rodamco sold part of its stake in 2001 to the real estate investment arm of CalPERS as it tried to thwart a hostile takeover by a consortium including Westfield Group and Simon Property Group. Ultimately unsuccessful in preventing the buyout, Rodamco's ownership interest and management operation of the mall was acquired by Simon Property Group in early 2002.

During these rapid ownership changes, development continued on a third expansion of the shopping center, known as Galleria IV. Completed in March 2003, it added 800,000 sq ft (74,000 m^{2}) to the south, anchored by Nordstrom and Foley's, as well as an additional 70 stores. Upon completing Galleria IV, the shopping mall totaled 2.4 million ft² (220,000 m²) of retail space.

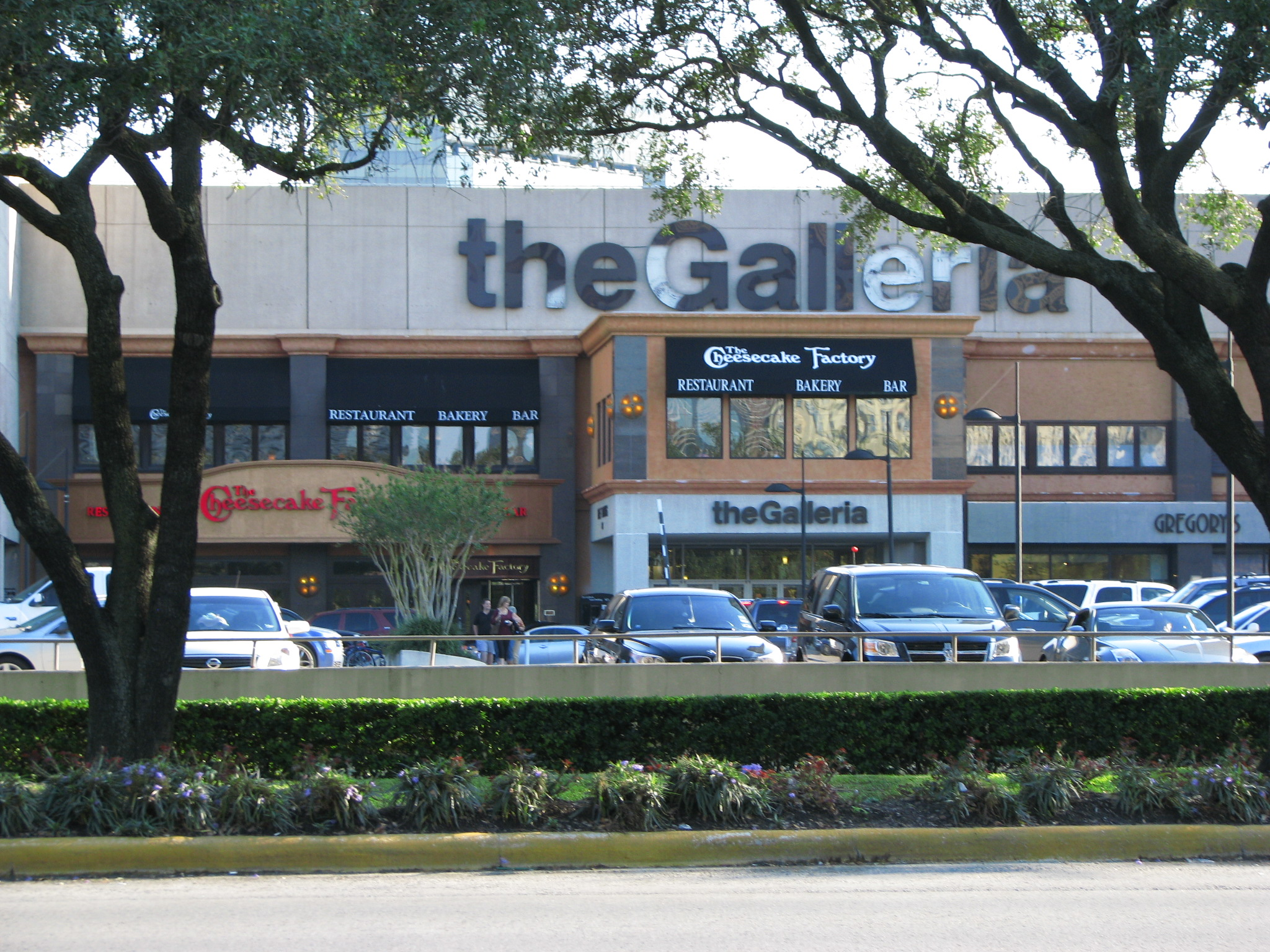
The exterior of the Galleria facing Westheimer Road

An additional 100,000 ft² (9,300 m²) of retail space opened in August 2006. During the reconstruction, some of the former Lord & Taylor infrastructure was recycled, although a section of catwalks dating back to the Galleria II's 1976 expansion was demolished; this trend was similar to the Galleria IV's expansion in 2002.

In 2005, after the merger of Macy's and Foley's parent companies, it was announced that the Macy's store at Sage would remain operational as a full line store and that the existing Foley's would be renamed Macy's in September 2006. The original Macy's continued to operate until 2014, when it was razed to accommodate the relocation of Saks Fifth Avenue into a new state of the art flagship store on the Macy's at Sage site. After the Saks relocation, the Marshall Field's building was reconstructed into smaller shops. These provided direct access to Galleria III and the new Saks Fifth Avenue store.

Visitors shopping on several levels at the Galleria

In 2008, Forbes ranked the Galleria as one of the world's best shopping malls. With 35 million annual visitors, The Galleria has constantly been named the most visited attraction in Greater Houston.

During 2025, a series of shootings and crimes, including a fatal shooting in a parking garage on Alabama street, had led to concerns over the mall's security. Houston Police Department provided data that showed that overall crime had been down within the time period between January 1st and June 25th in 2024 and 2025. The Yellow parking lot experiences the most crime out of any parking zones at the Galleria, with over 200 incidents annually.

In 2026 the management announced that customer parking would become paid, and no longer free of charge. Employees retained free parking.

== Facilities ==
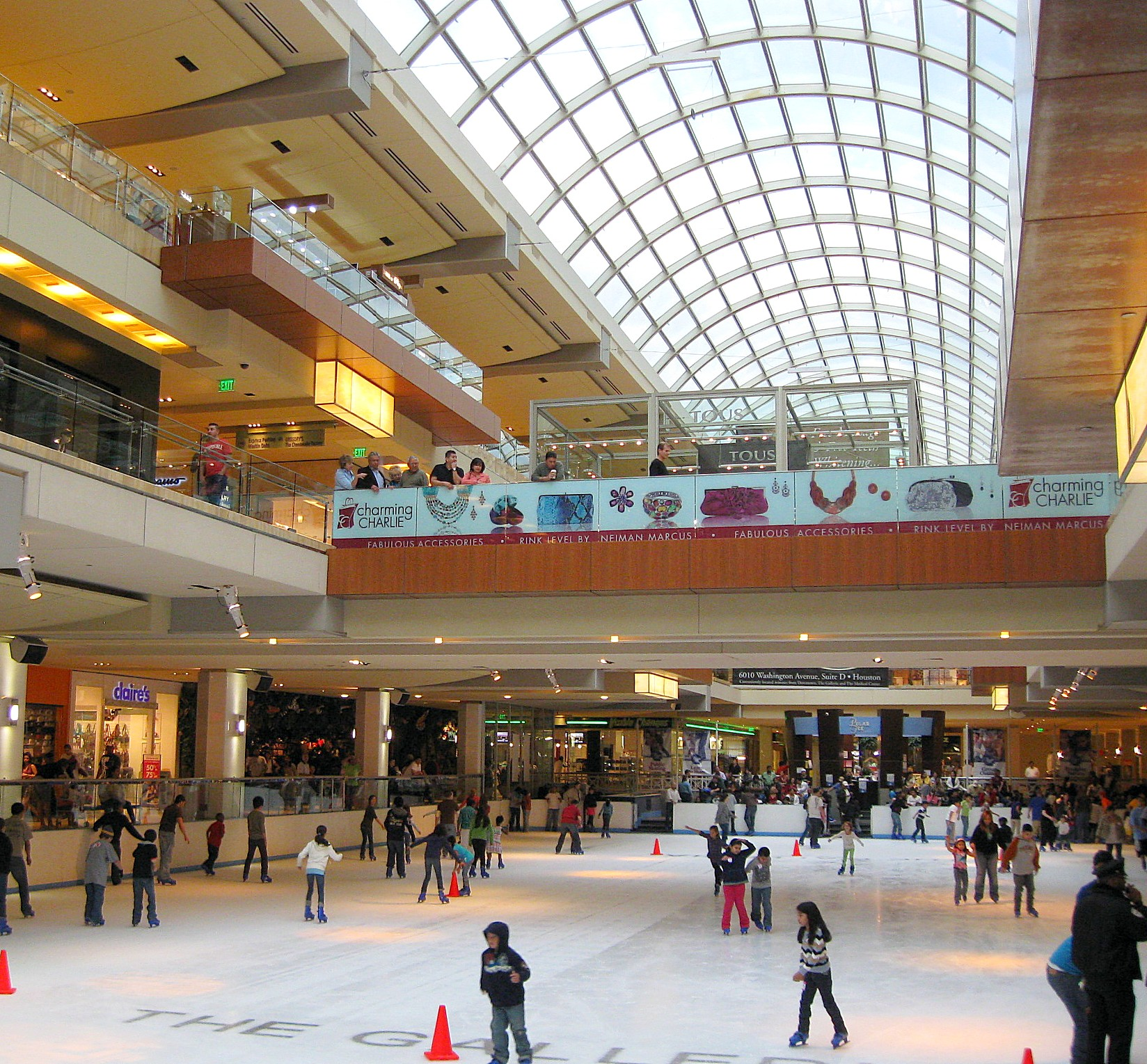
Polar Ice at the Galleria

The Galleria includes a 20,000-square-foot (1,900 m^{2}) ice skating facility with an 80 feet (24 m) x 180-foot (55 m) rink. The rink, known as "Polar Ice" and originally built in 1970, was the first ever built inside a mall. The rink is positioned below the mall's central glass atrium, which Hines originally added to increase the visibility of the stores in the lower level. There is a jogging track on the roof around the atrium with a view of this rink. About 50 restaurants and specialty food stores at all price points and service levels are located throughout the Galleria complex. A Nobu was added to the property and opened in June 2018.

=== Lodging ===
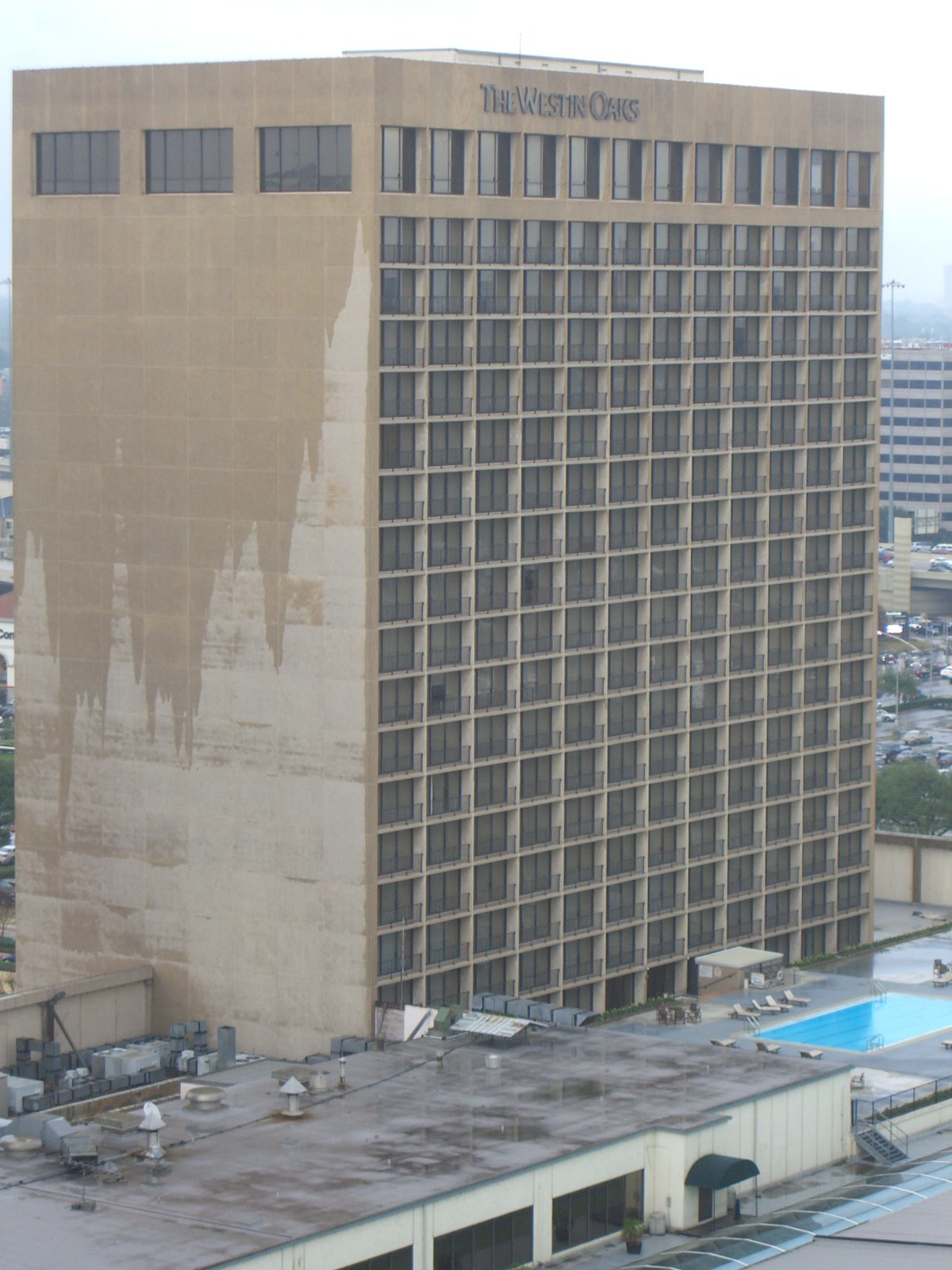
The Westin Oaks Houston

Two hotels are located directly in the Galleria complex. The 400-room Houston Oaks Hotel opened in September 1971, soon after the opening of the first wing of the Galleria. The 500-room Galleria Plaza Hotel opened on November 18, 1977, soon after the opening of the second wing. Both were managed from their opening by Western International Hotels. That chain was renamed Westin Hotels in 1981, and the hotels were renamed The Westin Galleria and The Westin Oaks in 1984.

=== Offices ===
The Galleria has three office towers with Galleria Financial Center acting as the hub of the mall, where the shops and offices share a common atrium with glass elevators and offices overlooking the mall below. The other two office buildings are Post Oak Tower, and the Galleria Tower. Additionally, the Williams Tower is also connected to the mall.

== See also ==
- List of largest shopping malls in the United States
