= Stanford Financial Group =

Private international group of financial services companies

- Type: Private
- Industry: Global financial services
- Genre: Global financial services
- Founder: Robert Allen Stanford
- Defunct: February 17, 2009
- Fate: Placed in receivership on allegations that this company was a Ponzi scheme
- Headquarters: Houston, Texas, United States
- Key people: Robert Allen Stanford (chairman and CEO); Laura Pendergest-Holt (chief investment officer); James Davis (CFO)
- Services: Wealth management
- Owner: Robert Allen Stanford
- Divisions: Stanford Capital Management; Stanford Group Company; Stanford International Bank Ltd.

The Stanford Financial Group was a privately held international group of financial services companies controlled by Allen Stanford, until it was seized by American authorities in early 2009. Headquartered at 5050 Westheimer in Uptown Houston, Texas, it had 50 offices in several countries, mainly in the Americas, included the Stanford International Bank, and was said to have managed US$8.5 billion of assets for more than 30,000 clients in 136 countries on six continents. On February 17, 2009, U.S. Federal agents placed the company into receivership due to charges of fraud. Ten days later, the U.S. Securities and Exchange Commission amended its complaint to accuse Stanford of turning the company into a "massive Ponzi scheme".

== History ==
Allen Stanford traced his company to the insurance company founded in 1932 in Mexia, Texas, by his grandfather, Lodis B. Stanford. However, there was no direct connection between the insurance company and Allen Stanford's banking business, which he started on the British Overseas Territory of Montserrat in the West Indies in the 1980s. Allen Stanford's move into banking utilised funds he had made in real estate in Houston in the early 1980s.

In 2008, Stanford Financial Group announced it would open a new global management complex in St. Croix, U.S. Virgin Islands, to include the base for the corporate support functions such as business technology, compliance, finance, human resources, investment strategy and legal, as well as the chairman's office. Completion was planned for July 2009 but did not occur due to the company's dissolution.

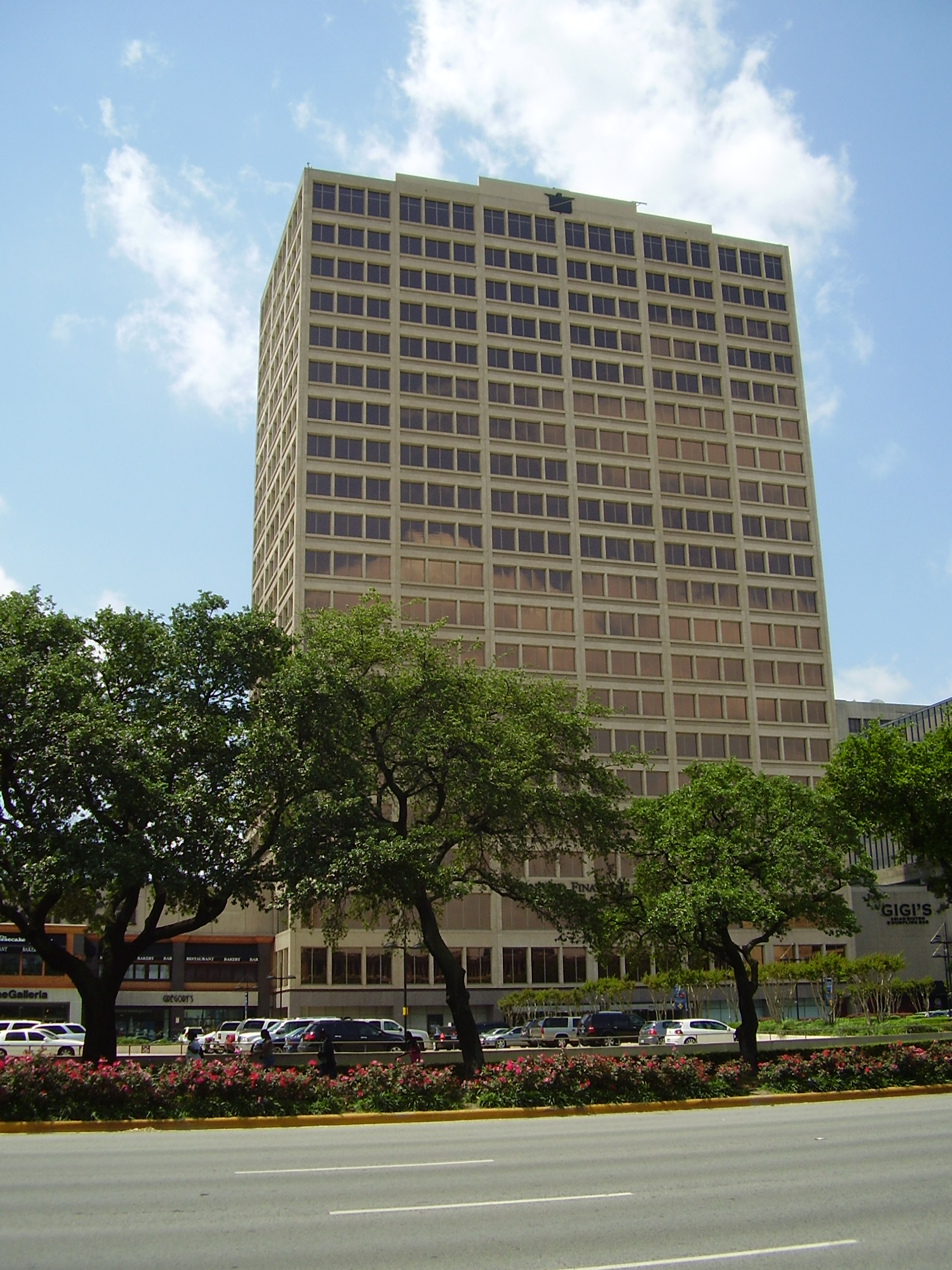
Galleria Tower II, the headquarters of Stanford Financial Group in Houston

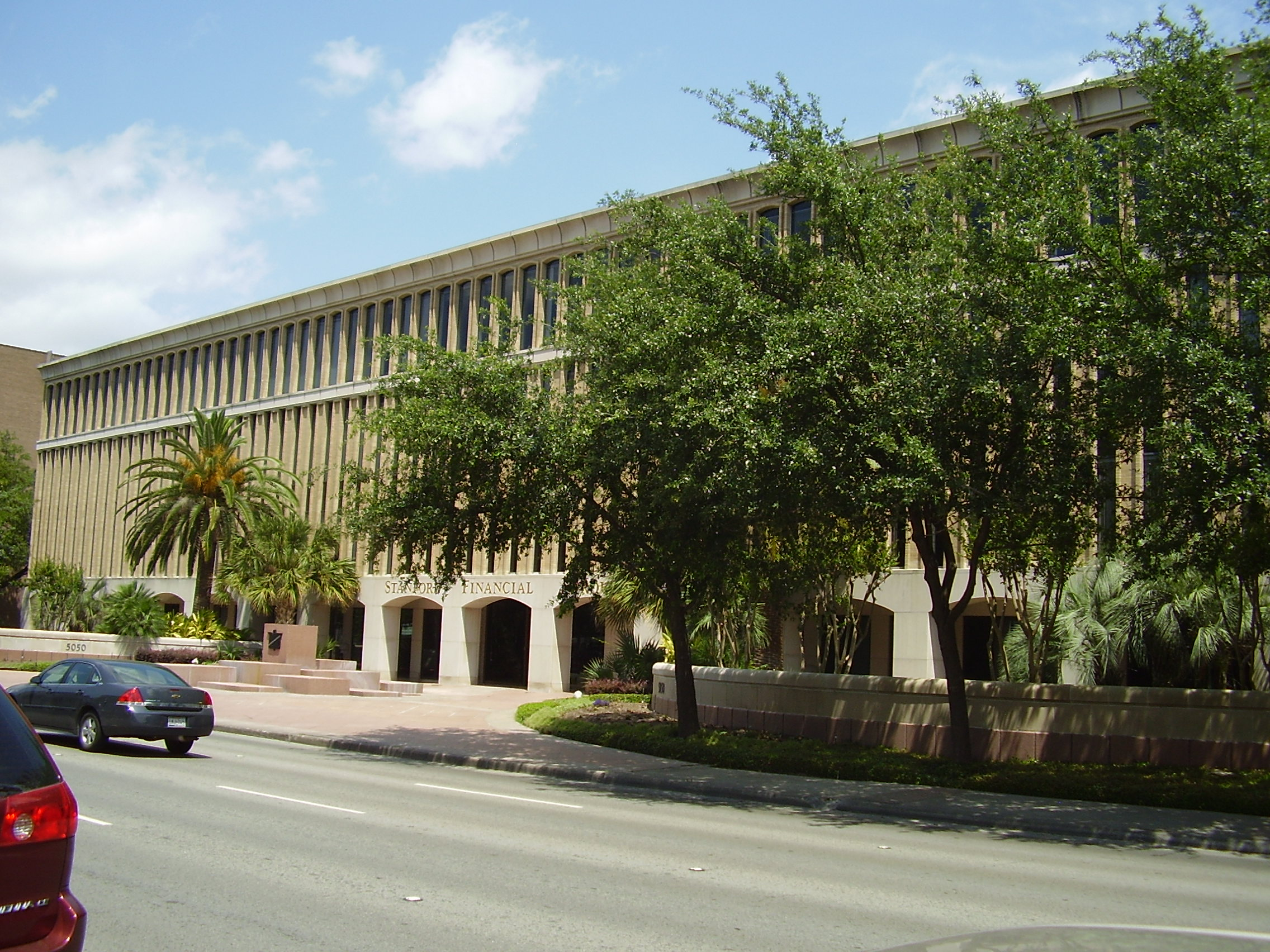
Offices for Stanford Financial Group in Houston – This building formerly had the headquarters

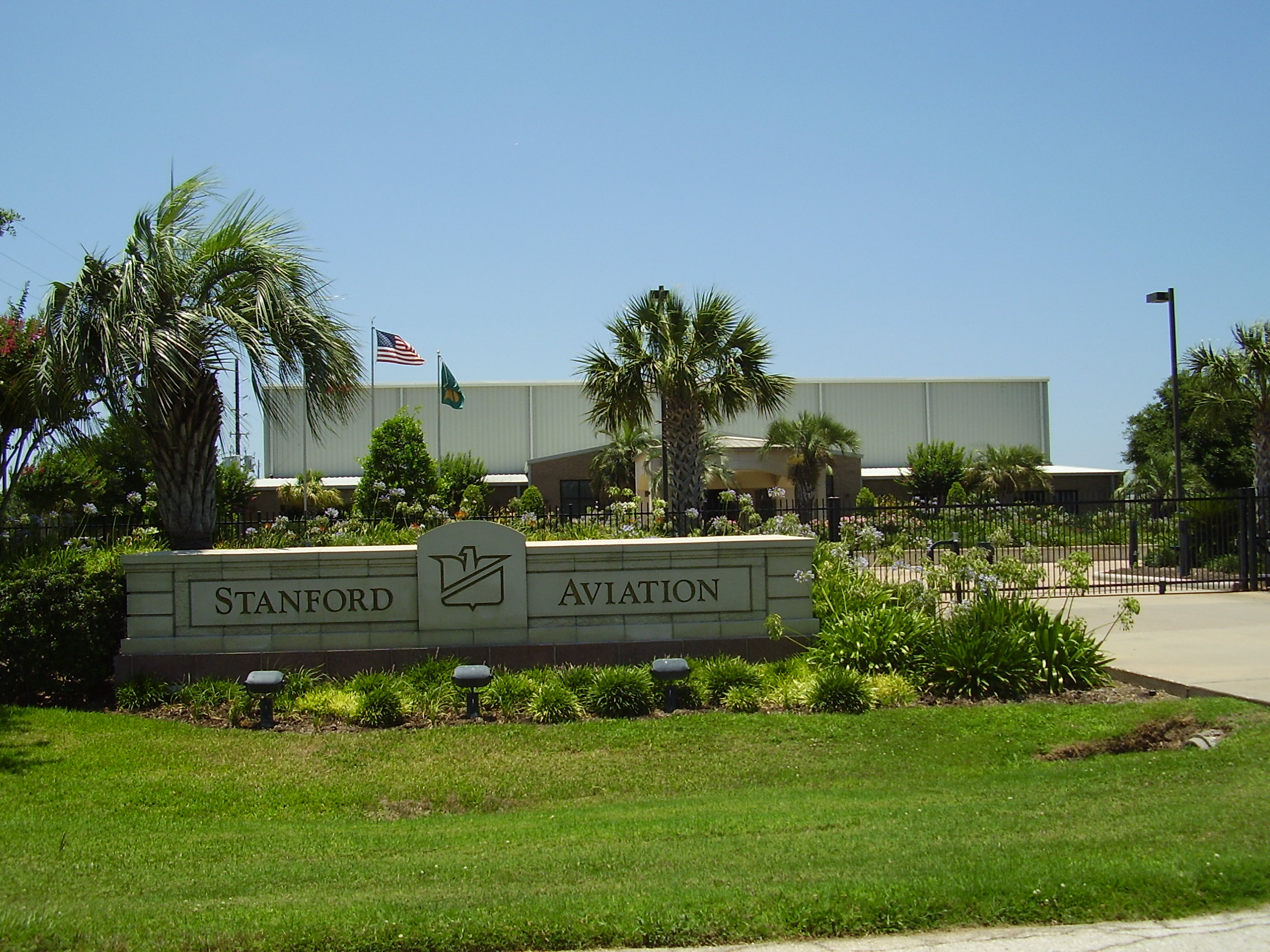
Stanford Aviation Terminal at Sugar Land Regional Airport

The company was bound by a web of personal and family ties. Stanford's chief financial officer and second-in-command, James M. Davis, was his roommate at Baylor University. The chief investment officer, Laura Pendergest-Holt, grew up attending a church in Baldwyn, Mississippi, where Davis was a Sunday school teacher. Many top officials were related to each other. This led former employees to claim the company was fraught with nepotism; former executive Charles Satterfield told Bloomberg News that whenever someone asked questions, a common response was "I'm not going to question my brother-in-law."

== Affiliated companies ==
Stanford Financial Group comprised several affiliated companies:

- Stanford Financial Group Company (SFGC) was an entity based in Houston, Texas, USA, that provided financial services to several of the affiliated companies, and in particular to Stanford International Bank Limited (SIBL). The services were provided via a "Services Agreement" that paved the way for investor deposits to be funneled via a circuitous route to multiple destinations, including affiliated companies that leased multiple corporate jets, owned yachts, funded a cricket pitch and even a Swiss bank account used to bribe officials.
- Stanford Capital Management, investment adviser, based in Houston
- Stanford Group Company, broker-dealer, based in Houston
- Stanford International Bank, was started in 1986 in Montserrat where it was called Guardian International Bank. Allen Stanford relocated its operations to Antigua. On February 19, 2009, Nigel Hamilton-Smith and Peter Wastell of the British accounting firm Vantis were appointed joint receivers of the bank, and were made liquidators on April 15, 2009. In June 2010, the High Court of Antigua resolved that Vantis should be removed from its responsibilities. The firm, which had recently received government approval to sell the property assets, appealed the decision.
- Stanford Trust Company, helped manage and protect wealth. Vantis was also appointed receivers of Stanford Trust Company.
- Bank of Antigua
- Stanford Coins and Bullion

== Sponsorships and charity ==
In 2007, Stanford Financial Group assumed title sponsorship of the Stanford St. Jude Championship, a top PGA Tour event to benefit St. Jude Children's Research Hospital of Memphis, Tennessee. On March 20, 2009, after the Group's fraud was revealed, the PGA announced that they would be dropping their affiliation with the company and that for 2009 the event would be called the St. Jude's Classic.

Stanford Financial Group was the lead financier for the 2007 film The Ultimate Gift,. According to the Association for Healthcare Philanthropy, the story of The Ultimate Gift promoted philanthropy in not-for-profit health care institutions.

The group established a significant presence in golf, polo, tennis, cricket and sailing, sports which were popular among Stanford's wealthy clients. Stanford Financial Group was the title sponsor for such sporting events as the Stanford U.S. Open Polo Championship, the Stanford USPA Silver Cup, the Stanford Antigua Sailing Week, the PGA Tour Stanford St. Jude Championship, and the Stanford International Pro-Am. Stanford also sponsored professional golfers Vijay Singh, Camilo Villegas and David Toms as well as Morgan Pressel on the LPGA Tour. In tennis, the company was a sponsor of the Sony Ericsson Open. Stanford also sponsored the Champions Series Tennis Tournaments featuring Jim Courier, John McEnroe and Pete Sampras.

The Stanford Financial Tour Championship, previously known as the LPGA Playoffs at The ADT and the ADT Championship, was the season-ending golf tournament on the US-based LPGA Tour. Beginning with the 2009 event, it was to be sponsored by Stanford Financial Group.

As one of the founding partners, Stanford Financial Group was also involved in Tiger Woods's annual golf tournament, the AT&T National.

== Investigation and receivership ==
During the week of February 13, 2009, Stanford issued a letter to clients saying: "Regulatory officers have visited our offices and have stated that these are routine examinations". On February 17, 2009, U.S. federal agents entered the company's Houston and Memphis offices. Law enforcement officials placed signs on the office doors stating that the company was temporarily closed: "The company is still in operation but under the management of a receiver".

The Securities Exchange Commission's (SEC) charged Allen Stanford, Pendergest-Holt and Davis with fraud in connection with Stanford Financial Group's US$8 billion certificate of deposit (CD) investment scheme that offered "improbable and unsubstantiated high interest rates". This led the Federal government to freeze the assets of Allen Stanford, Stanford International Bank, Stanford Group Co., and Stanford Capital Management. In addition, Stanford International Bank placed a 60-day moratorium on early redemptions of its CDs.

On February 18 and 19, 2009, Ecuador and Peru suspended the operations of local Stanford units, and, in Venezuela and Panama, the governments seized local units of Stanford Bank. Mexico's financial regulators announced on February 19 that it was investigating the local affiliate of Stanford bank for possible violation of banking laws.

On February 26, 2009, Stanford official Laura Pendergest-Holt was arrested by Federal agents in connection with the alleged fraud. On that day the SEC said that Stanford and his accomplices operated a "massive Ponzi scheme", misappropriated billions of dollars of investors' money and falsified the Stanford International Bank's records to hide their fraud. "Stanford International Bank's financial statements, including its investment income, are fictional," the SEC said.

United States District Judge David Godbey froze all of the Stanford personal and corporate assets. Godbey gave them to Ralph Janvey, a Dallas receiver; Janvey will retain control until the SEC suit is resolved. A British receiver took the Antigua-based Stanford International Bank.

On July 1, 2009, James M. Davis, the CFO of the company, agreed to change course from his not guilty plea and plead guilty to three charges related to the Ponzi scheme fraud, once details can be worked out.

On November 13, 2009, the US District Court ordered brokerage accounts to be transferred to Dominick & Dominick LLC. The transfer became effective on January 20, 2010.

In 2011, an auction of Stanford's goods was held in Houston.

Mark J. Kuhrt (born 1973), the former global controller of Stanford Financial Group, was found guilty by a federal jury in Houston on November 19, 2012, of aiding Allen Stanford in a fraud scheme involving Stanford International Bank (SIB). He was charged in 2009.

Evidence at Kuhrt's trial showed that he knew about and monitored Stanford's misappropriation of SIB's assets, concealed the misappropriation from the public and nearly every other Stanford employee, and worked behind the scenes to keep it from being discovered. Additionally, he assisted Stanford in deceiving SIB clients during the 2008 financial crisis by claiming that Stanford had invested hundreds of millions of dollars in SIB when in fact he had not. Kuhrt assisted in the creation of a fraudulent real estate deal that involved inflating the value of land parcels that were bought for $63.5 million to a fictitious $3.2 billion.

US Prosecutor Jeffrey Goldberg said Stanford could not have carried out the fraud without help. He said Kuhrt - in his post as global controller of Stanford Financial Group - actively covered up his boss’s fraud. "Gil Lopez and Mark Kuhrt were faced with the same choice over and over again, to either help Allen Stanford lie to his customers and misuse their money or say ‘I don’t want to be part of it". The men chose to "keep it secret and actively work to keep others from finding out about it." added Goldberg during the trial.

Former Stanford accountant Henry Amadio told jurors that he expressed his concerns to his former boss, Mark Kuhrt, regarding the increasing amount of investor funds being utilized to fund Stanford's other ventures. According to Amadio, Kuhrt "was concerned too."

Kuhrt's trial lasted for five weeks. The jury deliberated for about three days before finding Kuhrt guilty on ten of the eleven counts in the indictment. He was found guilty on nine counts of wire fraud and one count of conspiracy to commit wire fraud. On one count of wire fraud, Kuhrt was found not guilty. He was promptly remanded into custody following the trial.

On February 14, 2013 Kuhrt was sentenced to 20 years in prison. In addition to the prison terms, U.S. District Judge David Hittner, who presided over the trial, sentenced Kuhrt to serve three years of supervised release and ordered Kuhrt to pay a $25,000 fine. Judge Hittner also found that Kuhrt obstructed justice by committing perjury at trial.

The conviction was upheld by the appeals court on June 5, 2015.

Kuhrt (Inmate Register Number: 99140-179) has been released on December 20, 2024.

=== Headquarters ===
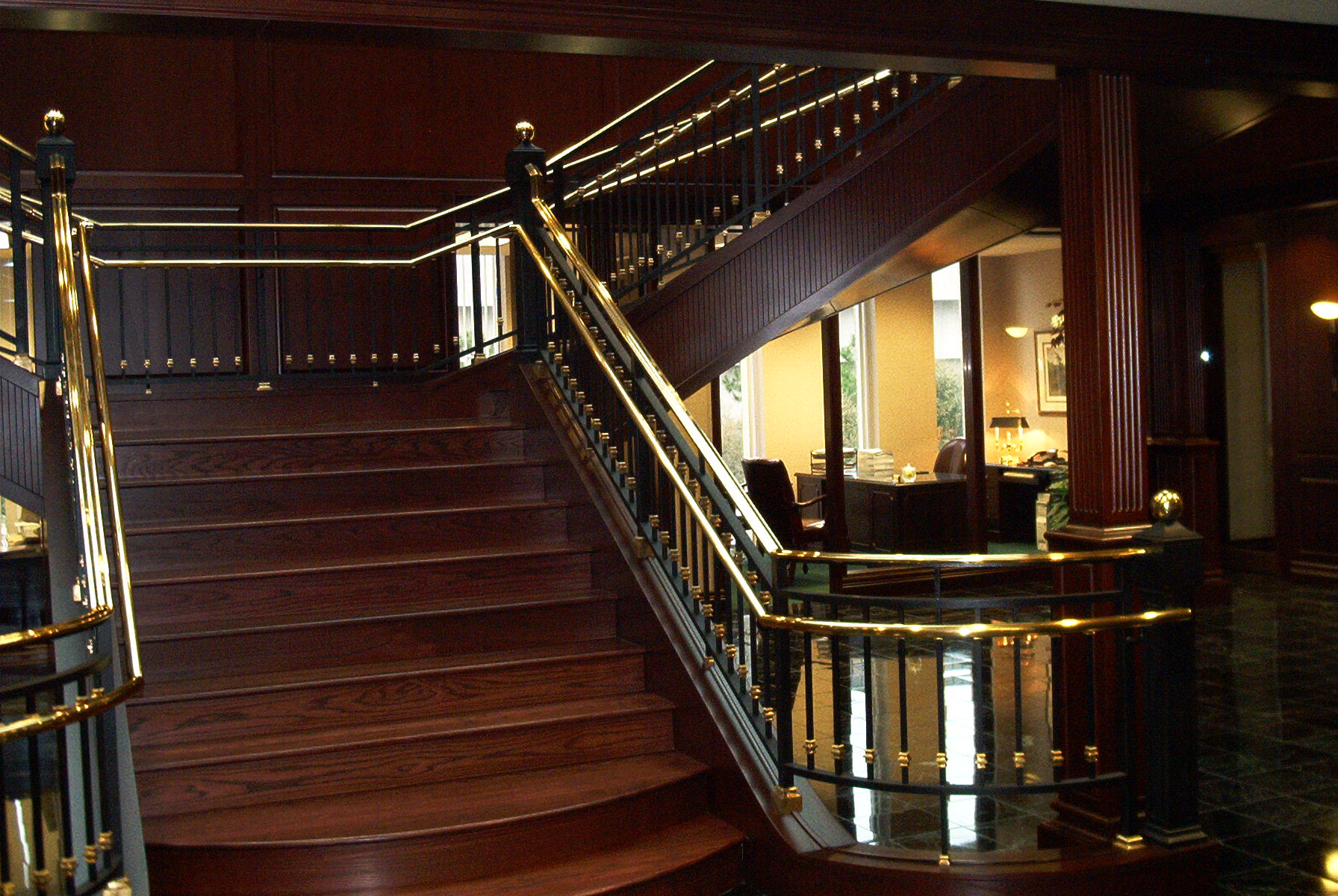
Inside Stanford Financial Group headquarters in 2002

Stanford was headquartered in the Galleria Tower II in Uptown Houston, Texas, U.S. Previously the company was headquartered in 5050 Westheimer Road, a three-story, 71,000 square feet (6,600 m^{2}) building across from The Galleria. Jennifer Dawson of the Houston Business Journal described the facility as "high-end office digs." By 2007 Stanford's headquarters moved to Galleria Tower II.

On May 18, 2010, the receiver entered into a stalking horse contract for the sale of 5050 Westheimer Road. During that month Black Forest Ventures LLC was the designated bidder to defeat at the auction, with a minimum bid being $12.5 million. The auction was scheduled to be held on Thursday June 24, 2010 at the offices of Baker Botts, L.L.P. in One Shell Plaza in Downtown Houston. The auction was canceled due to a lack of bids, and Black Forest's stipulated that it would acquire the building for $12.2 million. Black Forest bought the 5050 Westheimer building in July 2010.

=== Third-party settlements ===
On March 19, 2012, the 5th U.S. Circuit Court of Appeals overturned a federal judge's ruling from the previous year that threw out three class action lawsuits that are trying to use state laws to recover investor losses resulting from Stanford's scheme. The ruling allows lawsuits by investors who lost millions in the Stanford Ponzi scheme to go forward against several third parties.

In February 2023, TD Bank of Canada agreed to pay the receiver $1.2 billion to settle claims related to Stanford. Four other banks agreed to pay a total of $400 million; the five banks provided services to Stanford Financial during the two decades that it operated.

== See also ==
- Bernie Madoff
- Sholam Weiss
- 2008 financial crisis
- Scott Rothstein
- Tom Petters
- White-collar crime
- List of investors in Bernard L. Madoff Securities
