= David Harris (South Australia cricketer) =

Australian cricketer

Personal information
- Born: 19 December 1930; Alberton, South Australia
- Died: 8 August 2007 (aged 76); Henley Beach, South Australia
- Source: Cricinfo, 6 August 2020

David Harris (19 December 1930 – 8 August 2007) was an Australian cricketer. He played in twenty-five first-class matches for South Australia between 1953 and 1960.

== See also ==
- List of South Australian representative cricketers
