= Allen Stanford =

American-Antiguan financial fraudster

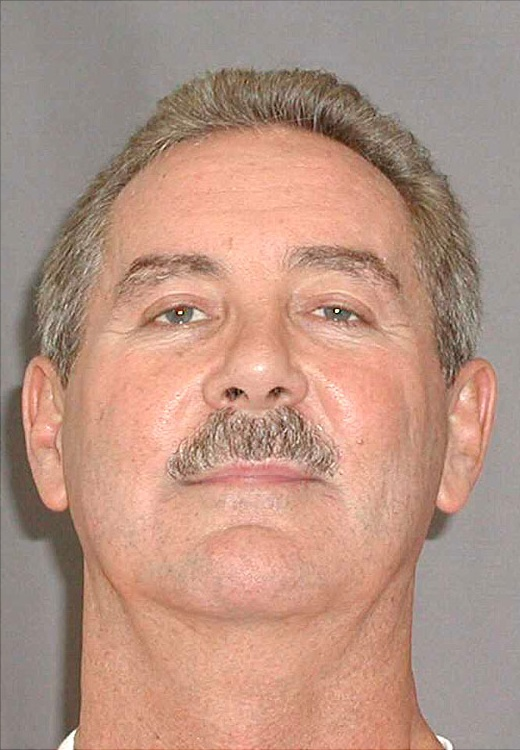
- Stanford in 2009
- Born: Robert Allen Stanford; March 24, 1950 (age 76); Mexia, Texas, U.S.
- Citizenship: United States; Antigua and Barbuda
- Education: Eastern Hills High School; Baylor University, BA, finance (1974)
- Occupations: Former Chairman and CEO Stanford Financial Group (now defunct)
- Known for: Businessman in the financial services sector, Ponzi scheme, involvement in Stanford Super Series
- Criminal status: Incarcerated at Coleman II penitentiary; Coleman, Florida; scheduled release date: March 13, 2103
- Spouse: Susan Stanford (separated)

Robert Allen Stanford (born March 24, 1950) is an American-Antiguan convicted financial fraudster, former financier, and sponsor of professional sports. He was convicted of fraud in 2012 for operating a large Ponzi scheme, and is serving a 110-year federal prison sentence.

Stanford was the chairman of the now-defunct Stanford Financial Group of Companies. A fifth-generation Texan who once resided in Saint Croix, U.S. Virgin Islands, he holds dual citizenship in Antigua and Barbuda and the United States. He contributed millions of dollars to politicians in Antigua and the United States, amongst other countries.

In early 2009, Stanford became the subject of several fraud investigations, and on February 17, 2009, was charged by the U.S. Securities and Exchange Commission with fraud and multiple violations of U.S. securities laws for alleged "massive ongoing fraud" involving $7 billion in certificates of deposits. The Federal Bureau of Investigation raided Stanford's offices in Houston, Texas; Memphis, Tennessee; and Tupelo, Mississippi. On February 27, 2009, the SEC amended its complaint to describe the alleged fraud as a "massive Ponzi scheme". He voluntarily surrendered to authorities on June 18, 2009. On March 6, 2012, Stanford was convicted on all charges except one count of wire fraud. He is serving a 110-year sentence at United States Penitentiary, Coleman II in Coleman, Florida. In September 2014, Stanford filed an appeal; it was rejected in October 2015.

== Early years ==
Stanford grew up in Mexia, Texas. His father, James Stanford (1927–2021), was mayor of Mexia and a member of the Board of Directors of Stanford Financial Group. His mother, Sammie (née Conn), is a nurse. After his parents divorced in 1959, Stanford and his brother went to live with their mother.

Stanford graduated from Eastern Hills High School in Fort Worth, Texas. In 1974, Stanford graduated from Baylor University in Waco, Texas, earning a BA degree in finance.

== Career ==
Stanford started in business in Waco, Texas, by opening a bodybuilding gym that failed. His first business success came from speculating in Houston real estate after the Texas oil bubble burst in the early 1980s; his father was his partner in this venture. The men made a fortune in the 1980s by purchasing depressed real estate and selling it years later as the market recovered. After his father retired in 1993, Stanford took control of the company, which by then had 500 employees.

Stanford moved to the Caribbean in the 1980s, first to Montserrat, then to Antigua. With Stanford Finance, he started Guardian International Bank on the island of Montserrat in 1985; he moved it to Antigua during a British crackdown on Montserrat's offshore-banking industry in the 1980s, renaming it Stanford International Bank, an affiliate of Stanford Financial.

Early in 2007, Stanford and Baldwin Spencer, prime minister of Antigua and Barbuda and formerly an ally, began verbally feuding in public.

In 2009, Antigua's Financial Services Regulatory Commission named a British firm, Vantis Business Recovery Services, the receiver for Stanford International Bank and Stanford Trust Company, the Associated Press reported.

== Criminal activity ==
Robert Allen Stanford
- Born: March 24, 1950 (age 76); Mexia, Texas
- Occupation: Financier (former)
- Status: Incarcerated at Coleman II penitentiary; Coleman, Florida; scheduled release date: March 13, 2103
- Conviction: March 6, 2012
- Criminal charges: Wire fraud, mail fraud, money laundering, conspiracy, obstruction of justice
- Penalty: 110 years in prison, forfeiture of $5.9 billion, $6.7 billion disgorgement, $5.9 billion civil penalty

=== Ponzi scheme and fraud convictions ===
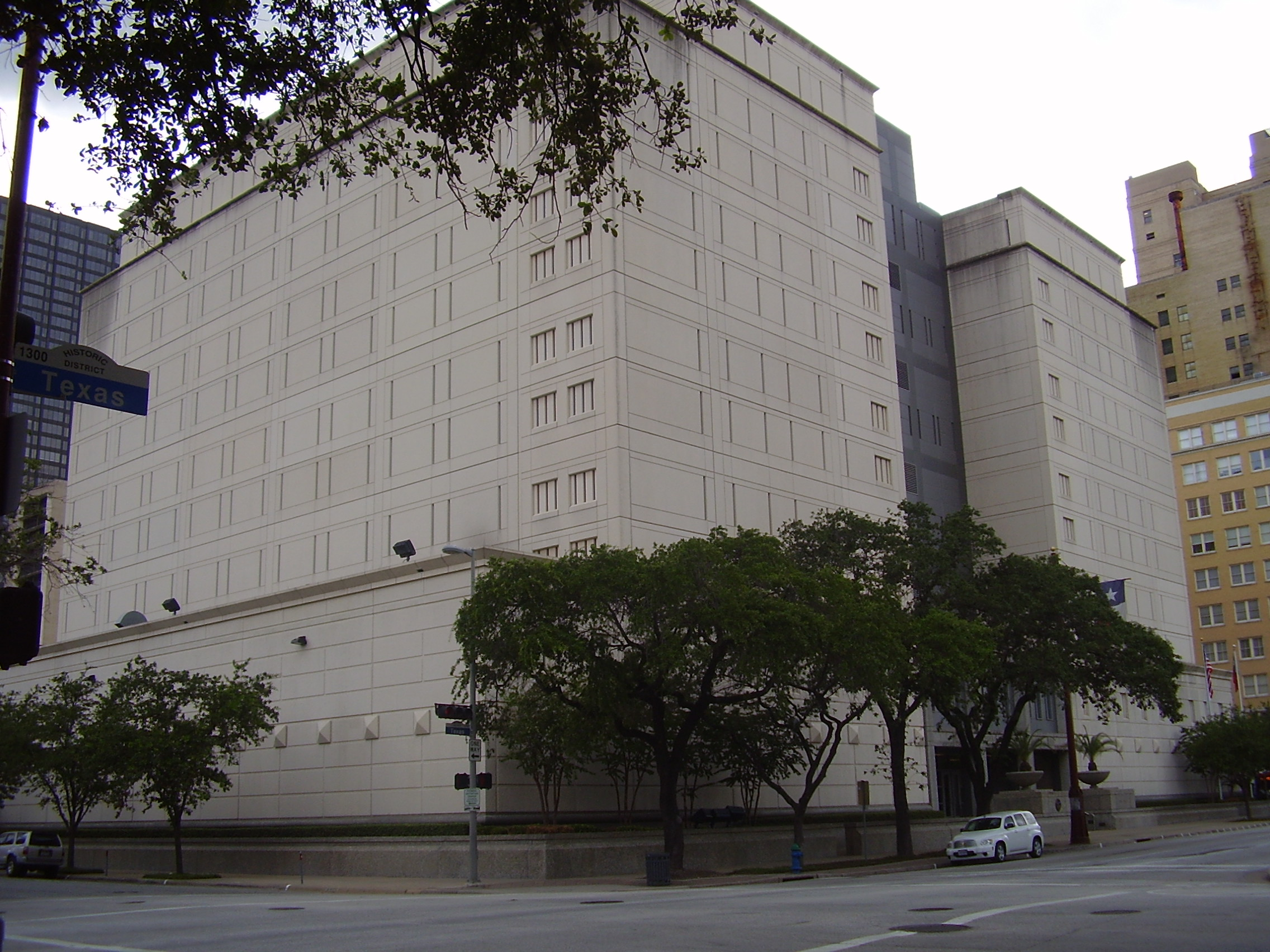
Federal Detention Center, Houston, where Stanford was held

Reports surfaced in early February 2009 that the SEC, FBI, Florida Office of Financial Regulation, and Financial Industry Regulatory Authority, a major U.S. private-sector oversight body, were investigating Stanford Financial Group, questioning the consistently higher-than-market returns which Stanford International Bank claimed to make for its depositors. A former executive told SEC officials that Stanford presented hypothetical investment results as actual historical data in sales pitches to clients. Stanford claimed his certificates of deposit were as safe as, or safer than, U.S. government-insured accounts.

Federal agents raided the offices of Stanford Financial on February 17, 2009, and treated it as "a kind of crime scene—cautioning people not to leave fingerprints". The SEC charged Stanford with "massive ongoing fraud" centered on an eight-billion-dollar investment scheme. Stanford's assets, along with those of his companies, were frozen and placed into receivership by a U.S. federal judge, who ordered Stanford to surrender his passport.

CNBC reported that Stanford tried to flee the country on the day his headquarters were raided. He contacted a private jet owner and attempted to pay for a flight to Antigua with a credit card, but was refused because the company would accept only a wire transfer.

On February 19, acting at the request of the SEC, FBI agents located Stanford at his girlfriend's house near Fredericksburg, Virginia, and served him with civil legal papers filed by the SEC. The SEC often files civil charges before criminal charges are filed.

Various governments took over Stanford's business operations. The Eastern Caribbean Central Bank announced that it assumed the local operations of the Bank of Antigua, which was renamed the Eastern Caribbean Amalgamated Bank. The Venezuelan government took over Stanford Bank Venezuela, the branch of Stanford's bank in that nation.

On February 27, 2009, the SEC said that Stanford and his accomplices operated a "massive Ponzi scheme," misappropriating billions of dollars of investors' money and falsifying the Stanford International Bank's records to hide their fraud. "Stanford International Bank's financial statements, including its investment income, are fictional," the SEC said. In an April 20 interview at the law offices of Houston criminal attorney Dick DeGuerin, Stanford denied any wrongdoing. His companies were well-run, he claimed, until the SEC "disemboweled" them.

On June 18, 2009, FBI agents took Stanford into custody. On June 25, 2009, he appeared in a Houston court and pleaded not guilty to charges of fraud, conspiracy, and obstruction. On August 27, 2009, Stanford was admitted into the Conroe, Texas, Regional Medical Center. He had complained of a racing heart during transport from the private prison in Huntsville, Texas, to the Federal Courthouse in Houston to attend a hearing concerning his attorney, Dick DeGuerin, who had asked the court for permission to withdraw from Stanford's case. Robert Luskin of Patton-Boggs, which had been representing Stanford in a simultaneous civil case, was to be lead counsel.

On September 26, 2009, Stanford was hospitalized due to injuries sustained when he was beaten by another inmate at the Cornell Companies-operated, Joe Corley Detention Facility in Conroe. His injuries were described as non-life-threatening.

In March 2010, SEC Inspector General H. David Kotz issued a report finding the SEC had failed to uncover the Ponzi scheme perpetrated by Stanford. Because of concerns raised by former SEC Chief Investigator David P. Weber of improper conduct by Kotz, Inspector General David C. Williams of the U.S. Postal Service was brought in to conduct an independent review. The Williams report found that Kotz "appeared to have a conflict of interest" because he had a personal relationship with an attorney representing Stanford's victims.

Stanford's trial date was set for January 2011. The district judge deemed that Stanford's anti-anxiety drug addiction impaired his judgment and therefore made him unfit to stand trial. Stanford was incarcerated at the Federal Detention Center, Houston. In February 2011 Stanford issued a counter-claim of $7.2 billion of damages against the FBI and the SEC. In May, prosecutors dropped seven charges against Stanford, leaving 14 charges remaining.

By November 5, 2011, Stanford was held at the Federal Medical Center at the Federal Correctional Complex, Butner in Butner, North Carolina. His attorneys claimed Stanford was unfit to stand trial due to amnesia resulting from his sustained injuries. On December 22, 2011, he was found competent to stand trial by U.S. District Judge David Hittner.

The trial began on January 24, 2012, at the Houston Federal Courthouse, Judge Hittner presiding. On March 6, after three hours of deliberation, the jury convicted him of masterminding a Ponzi scheme. Prosecutors sought the maximum permitted sentence of 230 years in prison—80 years more than the 150-year sentence given to Bernard Madoff—calling him "a ruthless predator" who "lived a life steeped in deceit." Stanford's lawyers sought a sentence of 31 to 44 months and a maximum of 10 years; the former sentence, with credit for time served, could have allowed him to exit prison without further jail time. According to Peter Henning of The New York Times, judges have been more willing to impose sentences for financial fraudsters that effectively amount to life sentences in recent years. The extent to which such frauds wreck people's lives, Henning wrote, amounts to "economic homicide," and such outsized sentences are a way to express society's anger at such conduct.

On June 14, 2012, Stanford was sentenced to 110 years in prison. Although less than half of the maximum sentence sought by prosecutors, this virtually ensures he will die in prison. Hittner ordered Stanford to forfeit $5.9 billion, saying that he orchestrated "one of the most egregious frauds ever presented to a trial jury in federal court." At sentencing, Stanford spoke for the first time in the proceedings, denying that he ever swindled anyone. He blamed his company's failure on "Gestapo tactics" by government regulators. He is incarcerated at Coleman II USP in Sumterville, Florida; his earliest possible release is March 13, 2103.

On April 26, 2013, federal district judge David Godbey sided with the SEC in its civil suit against Stanford and ordered him to disgorge $6.7 billion ($5.9 billion in illegal profits and $861 million in interest) and pay a $5.9 billion fine. He was permanently banned from the securities industry. Godbey wrote that Stanford carried out the fraud for over a decade "with a high degree of scienter," or knowledge that what he was doing was illegal.

Stanford filed a 299-page brief in September 2014 with the 5th U.S. Circuit Court of Appeals in New Orleans on his conviction. The appeal was rejected in October 2015.

U.S. authorities also charged the former head of Antigua and Barbuda’s Financial Services Regulatory Commission (FSRC) Leroy King for his involvement in the Stanford’s Ponzi scheme. He was extradited to the U.S. in November 2019 and pleaded guilty to obstructing a proceeding before the SEC and conspiracy to obstruct a Commission proceeding in the United States, and in February 2021 was sentenced to 10 years in prison.

=== Other business matters ===
==== Tax liens ====
The United States Court of Appeals for the Fifth Circuit, affirming much of a United States Tax Court’s ruling, found that Stanford and his wife Susan under-reported their 1990 federal taxes by $423,531.36. Public records suggest that Stanford may owe hundreds of millions of dollars in federal taxes. There are four federal tax liens from 2007 and 2008 against Stanford, totaling more than $212 million.

==== Money laundering investigation ====
The FBI and other agencies have been conducting an ongoing investigation of Stanford since 2008 for possible involvement in money laundering for Mexico's Gulf Cartel. According to The New York Times, Stanford once held a Cook Islands trust called "Baby Mama," with his mistress and two children as beneficiaries. The trust protected proceeds deposited into Swiss and Isle of Man bank accounts from the sale of a $2.5 million Florida home.

==== Trademark infringement lawsuit ====
In 2001, Stanford said that his great-great-great grandfather was a relative of Leland Stanford, the founder of Stanford University. He funded the restoration of Leland Stanford's mansion in Sacramento, California, "to help preserve an important piece of Stanford family history," and hired genealogists to prove he was a member of the Leland Stanford family. A university spokesperson said "We are not aware of any genealogical relationship between Allen Stanford and Leland Stanford". In 2008 the university filed a trademark infringement suit against Stanford, claiming the school's name was being used "in a way that creates public confusion" and is "injurious".

== Knighthood and revocation ==
A February 2009 Houston Chronicle article described Stanford as "the leading benefactor, promoter, employer and public persona" of Antigua and Barbuda. On November 1, 2006, Stanford was appointed Knight Commander of the Order of the Nation (KCN) of Antigua and Barbuda by the Antiguan government. Prince Edward, Earl of Wessex, joined the then Governor-General of Antigua and Barbuda, Sir James Carlisle, to make this announcement during the Silver Jubilee Independence Day Celebration. After being knighted, Stanford used the awarded title "Sir Allen" often; he was generally referred to as such both by Antiguans and internationally.

In October 2009, the National Honours Committee of Antigua and Barbuda voted unanimously to strip Stanford of his knighthood. On November 2, 2009, the recommendation was forwarded to the Governor-General, Dame Louise Lake-Tack. The order to revoke Stanford's knighthood and insignia was approved and was served upon Stanford on April 1, 2010.

== Other interests ==
=== Cricket ===
Stanford created and funded the Stanford 20/20 cricket tournament in the West Indies, for which he built his own ground in Antigua, the Stanford Cricket Ground. The first Stanford 20/20 Cricket Tournament was held in July and August 2006 where Guyana took 1st place defeating Trinidad and Tobago in the final. The second tournament occurred in January and February 2008 with a global television audience of 300 million. Trinidad and Tobago took first place and with it the US $280,000 Stanford Super Series prize after defeating Middlesex on October 27, 2008.

In June 2008, Stanford and the England and Wales Cricket Board (ECB) signed a deal for five Twenty20 internationals between England and a West Indies all-star XI, with a total prize fund of £12.27 million (US$20 million) to be awarded to the team that won the Championship. It was the largest prize ever offered to a team for a single tournament. This was in jeopardy after a row with Digicel, the sponsors of the West Indies cricket team, who were unhappy about sponsorship of the event. Eventually, the dispute was sorted out and the championship was won by Stanford Superstars, who defeated the England team by 10 wickets.

On February 17, 2009, when news of the fraud investigation became public, the ECB and WICB withdrew from talks with Stanford on sponsorship. On February 20, 2009, the ECB announced it had severed its ties with Stanford and cancelled all contracts with him.

=== Media ===
Stanford owned two newspaper businesses in Antigua and Barbuda and Saint Kitts and Nevis, both called The Sun. Following the scandal, both newspapers put workers on notice that their full operations would cease in April 2010.

=== Property ===
Stanford owned Maiden Island in Antigua and Barbuda.

== See also ==
- Caribbean Star Airlines
- James M. Davis
- LIAT
- Laura Pendergest-Holt
- Mark Kuhrt
- Chadbourne & Parke, LLP v. Troice
