= Stanford International Bank =

Caribbean bank

Stanford International Bank was a bank based in the Caribbean, which operated from 1986 to 2009 when it went into receivership. It was an affiliate of the Stanford Financial Group and failed when its parent was seized by United States authorities in early 2009 as part of the investigation into Allen Stanford.

Prior to its demise, Stanford International Bank Limited (SIBL) offered certificate of deposit (CDs) at rates consistently higher than those available from banks in the United States.

== History ==
=== Founding ===
The bank was started by Allen Stanford in 1986 in Montserrat where it was called Guardian International Bank. Allen Stanford's move into banking utilised funds he had made in real estate in Houston, Texas, in the early 1980s. There was no direct connection between Stanford's insurance business in Texas and the banking business.

Stanford relocated its operations to Antigua. The bank's portfolio was overseen by an investment committee consisting of Allen Stanford; his father; Laura Pendergest-Holt, Stanford Financial Groups' Chief Investment Officer; James M. Davis (Allen Stanford's college roommate), CFO of Stanford International Bank; and a resident of Mexia, Texas (where Stanford's US interests were based) with cattle ranching and car sales experience.

=== Regulatory investigation in the United States ===
In February 2009, the US Securities and Exchange Commission (SEC) investigated the US operations of the Stanford Financial Group, including the bank. On 13 February Stanford was quoted saying "the bank remains a strong institution".

On 17 February 2009, the SEC charged Allen Stanford, Pendergest-Holt and Davis with fraud in connection with the bank's US$8 billion certificate of deposit (CD) investment scheme that offered "improbable and unsubstantiated high interest rates". This led the federal government to freeze the assets of the bank and other Stanford entities. In addition, the bank placed a 60-day moratorium on early redemptions of its CDs.

On 26 February 2009, Pendergest-Holt was arrested by federal agents in connection with the alleged fraud. On 27 February 2009 the SEC said that Stanford and his accomplices operated a "massive Ponzi scheme", misappropriated billions of investors' money and falsified the Stanford International Bank's records to hide their fraud. "Stanford International Bank's financial statements, including its investment income, are fictional," the SEC said.

The former head of Antigua and Barbuda’s Financial Services Regulatory Commission (FSRC), Leroy King, also involved in the Allen Stanford Ponzi Scheme fraud, was charged by the US authorities. Extradited to the US in November 2019 and pleaded guilty to obstructing a proceeding before the SEC and to conspiracy to obstruct a Commission proceeding in United States, in February 2021 was sentenced to 10 years in prison.

=== Subsidiaries in Venezuela and Mexico ===
In 2007 the bank formed a subsidiary in Venezuela, which rapidly developed a network of branches throughout the country. There was a run on the bank in February 2009 following the SEC's investigation into Stanford's affairs in the US, and this forced the Venezuelan authorities to seize the bank. It was sold to Banco Nacional de Crédito in May 2009.

Mexico's financial regulator announced on 19 February 2009 that it was investigating the local affiliate of Stanford bank for possible violation of banking laws.

=== Receivership and liquidation ===
In the United States District Judge David Godbey froze all of the Stanford personal and corporate assets in the US and appointed Ralph Janvey of Dallas as receiver. Janvey retained control until the SEC suit is resolved.

On 19 February 2009, Nigel Hamilton-Smith and Peter Wastell of the British accounting firm Vantis were appointed joint receivers of the bank, and were made liquidators on 15 April 2009.

In February 2010, Vantis' auditors Ernst & Young expressed concern about whether Vantis would receive payment for its work on Stanford. Properties in Antigua emerged as an important part of the company's assets, to be sold to enable payment of creditors and Vantis' own fees.

In June 2010, it was announced that the liquidators and the US receiver had entered into a co-operation agreement, under which the liquidators were to deal with the realisation of the bank's assets in Antigua and the United Kingdom, and the US receiver was to deal with the realisation of the bank's assets in the US and Canada.

In June 2010, the High Court of Antigua resolved that Vantis should be removed from its responsibilities. The firm, which had recently received government approval to sell the property assets, appealed the decision. Vantis itself was placed in administration on 29 June 2010 and promptly broken up, with the various offices and businesses being sold as going concerns. Hamilton-Smith and Wastell transferred to the buyout firm FRP Advisory, and continued their legal fight to be reinstated as liquidators of Stanford. In May 2011 following a claim made to the Eastern Caribbean Court of Appeal, Hamilton-Smith and Wastell were removed as liquidators. On 12 May 2011, Marcus Wide and Hugh Dickson of the international accounting firm Grant Thornton were appointed the new liquidators by the High Court of Antigua.

In September 2011, it was reported that the U.S. Justice Department was investigating whether a Swiss subsidiary of Société Générale was used to channel funds to Stanford's personal accounts and failed to follow due diligence procedures or to ask questions about irregular banking activity.

On Friday, January 20, 2012, an email was sent by the Joint Liquidators to creditors who had been depositors, the "Fraud Victims" urging them to resubmit their claims. They were given some hope of an "interim distribution" but no imminent final sale of some major assets. The information is repeated and the forms are at http://www.sibliquidation.com/claims-administration/ (the URL denoted in the email was erroneous in as much as the "-" was missing between the words "claims" and administration").

=== Online creditors’ meeting ===
On 11 October 2011, the liquidators convened an online creditors’ meeting. The liquidators emphasized that there was a huge shortfall between the available assets and the claims. The claims are around US$7 billion. The assets available are estimated to range from US$73 million to US$1.5 billion. Some of the assets are harder to liquidate, such as property. Therefore, patience will be required to obtain the highest values in the long-term. Another goal of the liquidators is to avoid litigation that could be costly.

The liquidators reported that they had met with a number of representatives of various national governments. These governments each have taken their own independent legal actions under their regulatory and/or court systems. The USA is also contemplating a tax lien against the assets that could deprive the creditors of a sizable sum. US$5 million has already been spent by the liquidators.

The liquidators established a multinational creditors committee composed of six larger individual large claimants and one attorney representing a number of individuals. This committee does not have legal status in the liquidation, but it is administratively convenient for the liquidator to have a body to work with.

The liquidators reported that an interim distribution may be made in the first quarter of 2012.

== See also ==
- Mark Kuhrt
- Gilbert Lopez
