= Vantis =

Vantis plc was an accountancy firm based in London, England, providing accounting, tax and business advice to owner-managed businesses, listed companies, not for profit organisations, high-net-worth individuals and other professionals. It was placed in administration on 29 June 2010 and promptly broken up, with the various offices and businesses being sold as going concerns.

== History ==
Vantis was formed as a "consolidator", inviting existing small local accountancy partnerships to join it and become part of a national company. It was listed on the Alternative Investment Market (AIM) in May 2002.

In 2005 it took over struggling competitor Numerica, selling some of the offices to BDO Stoy Hayward. Numerica was one of the first consolidators, led by former firm Levy Gee; at a time when audit work was restricted to partnerships, it was the first publicly listed company to employ staff part-time who also did audit work for an associated partnership. Numerica had been the UK member of the global accountancy network HLB International since 2002, so Vantis succeeded as the UK member of the network.

As of 2010 Vantis was ranked the 13th largest accountancy firm in the UK by Accountancy Age.

However, by February 2010 its work as liquidator of Stanford International Bank raised doubts as to whether it would receive payment for the high-profile appointment.

In June 2010, Vantis was reported to be considering disposals of part of its business to reduce its bank loans, although the company declined to confirm this. Paul Jackson then resigned as Chief Executive on 12 June, and on Monday 14 June Vantis' shares were suspended due to uncertainty over its financial position.

Vantis entered administration on 29 June 2010, and on the same day substantially all of its businesses were sold by the administrators, FTI Consulting. Most of the business recovery arm was sold to its own management in a management buy-out for £11 million, resulting in the creation of a new business, FRP Advisory LLP. Rival consolidator RSM Tenon bought Vantis Financial Management, one business recovery office and three business advisory and tax offices for £4.46 million. The remaining business advisory and tax offices were sold separately to the local partners, and various small specialist businesses were also sold.

The administrators expected to pay general creditors 9p in the pound. HM Revenue and Customs stood to write off £10 million.

== Notable clients ==
=== Stanford International Bank ===
Vantis executives Nigel Hamilton-Smith and Peter Wastell acted as the joint receivers of Stanford International Bank Limited and Stanford Trust Company Limited from 19 February 2009 and were made liquidators of Stanford International Bank on 15 April 2009.

In February 2010, Vantis' auditors Ernst & Young expressed concern about whether Vantis would receive payment for its work on Stanford. Properties in Antigua emerged as an important part of the company's assets, to be sold to enable payment of creditors and Vantis' own fees.

In June 2010, the High Court of Antigua resolved that Vantis should be removed from its responsibilities. The firm, which had recently received government approval to sell the property assets, appealed the decision.

After the breakup of Vantis, Hamilton-Smith and Wastell transferred to the buyout firm FRP Advisory, and continued their legal fight to be reinstated as liquidators of Stanford. However, the Eastern Caribbean Court of Appeal confirmed their removal in May 2011, and the case was passed to Marcus Wide and Hugh Dickson at Grant Thornton.

=== Sixty UK Limited ===
Vantis were the administrators of the company that owns the Energie and Miss Sixty fashion brands. The company returned to normal operations.

Two creditors made a claim that they had been treated unfairly, and the High Court judge stated that there was a prima facie case of professional misconduct which should be considered by the administrators' professional body.

=== Portsmouth Football Club ===
Vantis was appointed in February 2010 by the owners and the board of Portsmouth Football Club to prepare a statement of financial affairs, detailing the assets and liabilities of the club.

== Allegation of tax evasion ==
In 2006 HMRC raided the homes of senior executives of Vantis following enquiries into the legitimacy of a tax avoidance scheme being promoted by the firm. Three senior executives were reportedly interviewed under caution. Subsequently, in October 2009, Roy Faichney and David Perrin were suspended and later dismissed by Vantis after HMRC charged them with offences relating to abuse of Gift Aid tax relief. They denied the charges and commenced action against Vantis for wrongful dismissal. Both were convicted in 2012; Perrin was jailed for 18 months and Faichney for four years.
