= Sir Sydney Walling Highway =

Highway in Antigua

Coordinates: 17°05′50.0″N 61°46′56.5″W

Road 20
- Sir Sydney Walling Highway

Route information
- Length: 6.5 km (4.0 mi)

Major junctions
- From: Factory Road in Scotts Hill
- To: Mount Joy Roundabout in Vernons

Location
- Country: Antigua and Barbuda

Highway system
- Roads in Antigua and Barbuda

The Sir Sydney Walling Highway is a major east–west highway in Antigua. It travels through Saint John, Saint George, and Saint Peter and ends at the roundabout with Jonas Road and the Sir Robin Yearwood Highway. The road travels primarily through rural settlement and grazing lands. The highway was named after Sydney Walling in 2006, a successful cricket batsman who died in 2009 at the age of 102. It is the main highway of Saint George and links the St. John's area to eastern Antigua. There are several major junctions, including with Mahico Drive and Sir George Walter Highway at 0.1 km, Paynters Road at 1.2 km, Sea View Farm Main Road at 2.4 km, a roundabout at 3.6 km leading to Fleming Street and the Sir Vivian Richards Stadium, a second junction with Fleming Street at 4.8 km, and a junction with Old Parham Road at 5.9 km. It terminates at the Mount Joy Roundabout in Vernons (6.5 km). The highway is a focus of the Infrastructural Rehabilitation Road Project and has received upgrades from this work. Resurfacing work was done on the highway in 2023. The road is the focus of multiple village and political boundaries. Major settlements include Piggotts, Paynters, and Vernons.

== Junctions ==
Parish	Location	km	mi	Destinations	Notes
Saint John	Scotts Hill	0.0	0.0	Factory Road and Burning Flames Highway	
Saint John	Scotts Hill	0.1	0.062	Mahico Drive and Sir George Walter Highway	
Saint George	Piggotts	1.2	0.75	Paynters Road	
Saint George	Paynters	2.4	1.5	Sea View Farm Main Road	
Saint George	Paynters	3.6	2.2	Fleming Street	
Saint George	Paynters	4.8	3.0	Fleming Street	
Saint Peter	Vernons	5.9	3.7	Old Parham Road	
Saint Peter	Vernons	6.5	4.0	Mount Joy Roundabout	
1.000 mi = 1.609 km; 1.000 km = 0.621 mi
