= List of airlines of Antigua and Barbuda =

== Active ==
| Airline | Image | IATA | ICAO | Callsign | Founded | Notes |
|---|---|---|---|---|---|---|
| CalvinAir Helicopters | | | | | | |
| Caribbean Helicopters | | | | | 1995 | |
| Liat Air | | 5L | GAO | SOAR | 2020 | Replaced LIAT (1974) |

== Defunct ==
| Airline | Image | IATA | ICAO | Callsign | Founded | Ceased operations | Notes |
|---|---|---|---|---|---|---|---|
| 4 Island Air Services | | FX | FIA | | 1981 | 1985 | Merged into LIAT |
| Aerowings | | | AWG | | 2001 | 2004 | |
| Antigua Airways | | | | | 2022 | 2023 | Virtual airline |
| Antigua Caribbean Airways | | | | | 2007 | 2007 | Formed by Caribbean International Hotel |
| Antigua International Airways | | NQ | | | 1990 | 1991 | Renamed Great Atlantic Airlines |
| CAIRGO | | | | | 1974 | 1974 | |
| Carib Aviation | | 3Q | DEL | RED TAIL | 1972 | 2008 | |
| Caribbean Clipper Airways | | HU | ABI | | 1993 | 1994 | Renamed Paradise Airways |
| Caribbean Star Airlines | | 8B | GFI | CARIB STAR | 2000 | 2007 | Merged into LIAT |
| Caribbean Winds Airlines | | | WND | WINDY | 1995 | 1996 | |
| Caribjet | | | CBJ | RIGEL | 1992 | 2000 | Renamed CBJ Cargo |
| CBJ Cargo | | | CBJ | RIGEL | 2000 | 2004 | |
| Eastern Caribbean Airways | | HU | ABI | | 1992 | 1993 | Renamed Caribbean Clipper Airways |
| Grand Atlantic Airways | | NQ | ABI | | 1990 | 1992 | Renamed Eastern Caribbean Airways |
| LIAT | | LI | LIA | LIAT | 1974 | 2024 | Replaced by LIAT20 |
| Paradise Airways | | HU | ABI | | 1994 | 1995 | Renamed Prestige Airways |
| Seagreen Air Transport | | ES | ESA | | 1972 | 1997 | |
| Skyjet | | XH | SKJ | | 1992 | 2001 | |

== See also ==
- List of airlines of the Americas
- List of defunct airlines of the Americas
- List of airports in Antigua and Barbuda
