= Friars Hill Road =

Highway in Antigua

Coordinates: 17°8′41.85″N 61°49′52.31″W

Road 18
- Friars Hill Road
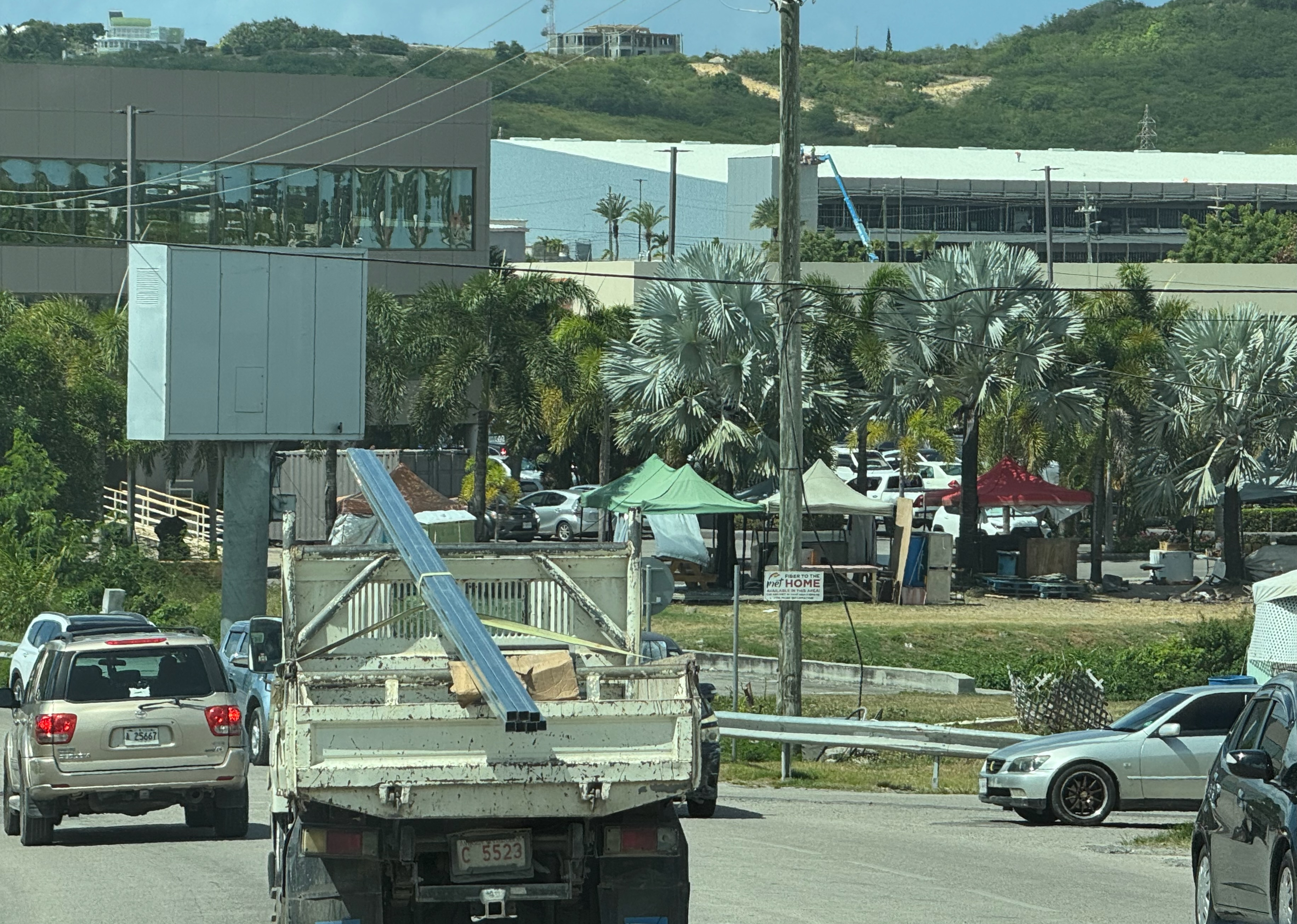
- Northbound in Cedar Valley

Route information
- Length: 4.8 km (3.0 mi)

Major junctions
- From: Cedar Grove Main Road in Cedar Grove
- To: Government House Roundabout in St. John's

Location
- Country: Antigua and Barbuda

Highway system
- Roads in Antigua and Barbuda

Friars Hill Road is a highway (Note: Officially designated as such by the government.) in Saint John, Antigua. The highway is one of the busiest roads in the country, with 32,000 people using this road and the Sir George Walter Highway daily, about seventy-five percent of the driving population. The road links St. John's with key tourism infrastructure in the North Coast and Cedar Grove areas. The road is the basis of many political boundaries and is one of the largest business corridors in Antigua, home to shopping malls, hotels, restaurants, and theatres.

The highway begins at the roundabout in Cedar Grove and continues southbound to the junction with Old Popeshead Road at 0.29 km. It continues south through Cedar Valley to the junction with Cedar Valley Road at 1.8 km. It further continues to the junction with West Indies Oil Road at 2.5 km, the junction with Launchland Benjamin Drive at 3.9 km, the roundabout with Dickenson Bay Street at 4.6 km, and ends at the roundabout with Cross Street, Bishopgate Street, and Old Parham Road at 4.8 km.

The road is undergoing expansion, with parcels being acquired in 2019 to lengthen the road and flood mitigation works announced in January 2026.

The road receives its name from Friars Hill, which was also the name of a sugar estate that has since been demolished.

== Junctions ==
The entire route is in Saint John Parish.

Location	km	mi	Destinations	Notes
Cedar Grove	0.0	0.0	Cedar Grove Roundabout at Cedar Grove Main Road	
Cedar Grove	0.29	0.18	Old Popeshead Road	
Cedar Valley	1.8	1.1	Cedar Valley Road	
Cedar Valley	2.5	1.6	West Indies Oil Road	
St. John's	3.9	2.4	Launchland Benjamin Drive	
St. John's	4.6	2.9	Dickenson Bay Street	
St. John's	4.8	3.0	Government House Roundabout to Cross Street, Bishopgate Street, and Old Parham Road	
1.000 mi = 1.609 km; 1.000 km = 0.621 mi
