= LIAT (1974) =

Airline in Antigua and Barbuda

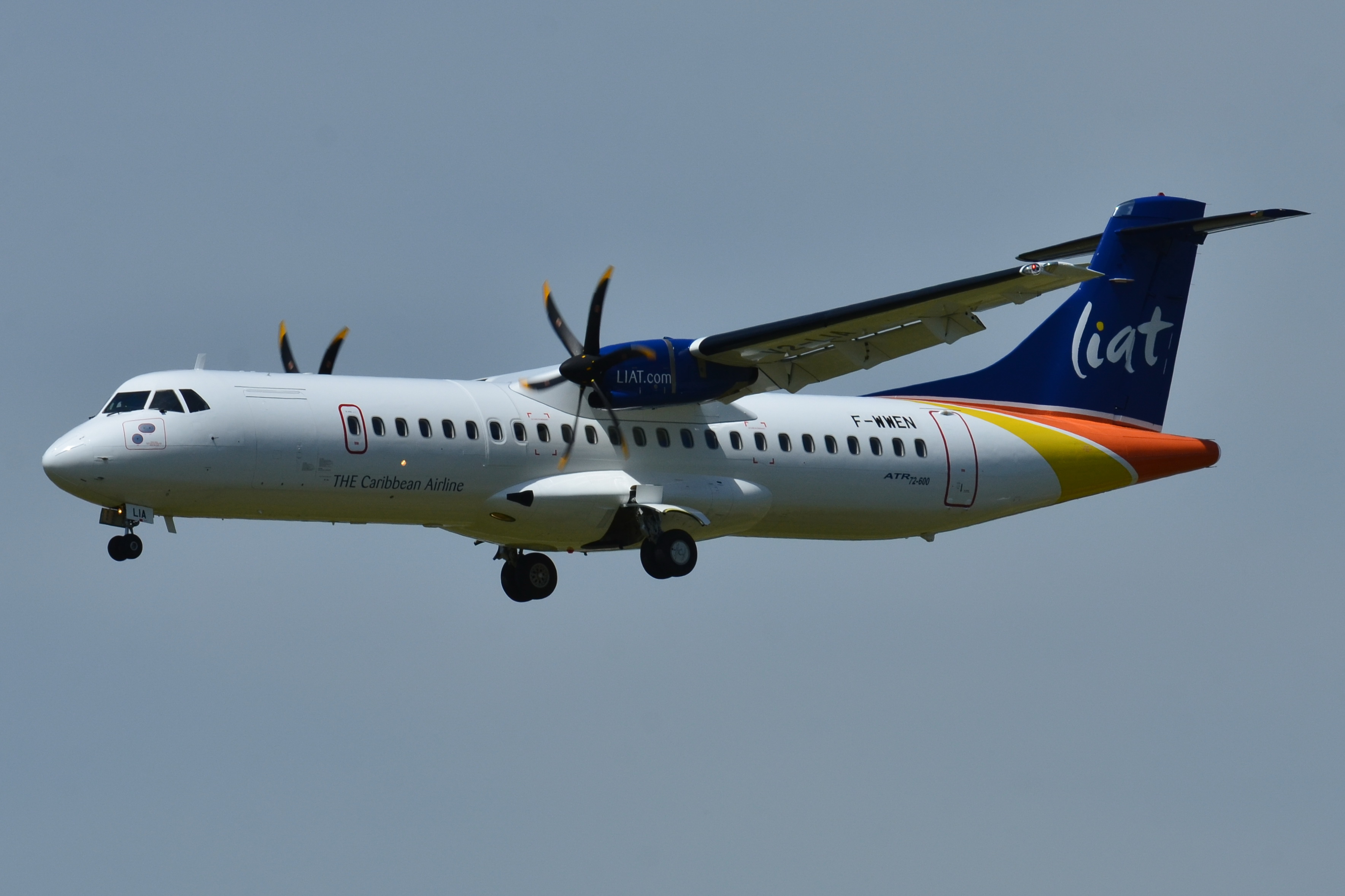
IATA	ICAO	Call sign
LI	LIA	LIAT
- Founded: 20 October 1956 (as Leeward Islands Air Transport Services)
- Commenced operations: 20 October 1974
- Ceased operations: 24 January 2024
- Operating bases: VC Bird International Airport; Grantley Adams International Airport
- Alliance: Caribsky
- Fleet size: 1
- Destinations: 8
- Headquarters: Saint George Parish, Antigua
- Key people: Cleveland Seaforth (Administrator)
- Website: www.liat.com

LIAT (1974) Ltd, also known as Leeward Islands Air Transport Services and operating as LIAT, was a regional airline headquartered in Antigua and Barbuda that operated high-frequency inter-island scheduled services to 15 destinations in the Caribbean. The airline's main base was V.C. Bird International Airport, Antigua and Barbuda, with a secondary base at Grantley Adams International Airport, Barbados. The airline was reformed into a new entity LIAT (2020) which continues to provide connections between the Caribbean islands. LIAT (2020) commenced limited service in August 2024 and has since rebranded to Liat Air.

On 27 June 2020, the Antiguan prime minister Gaston Browne announced that LIAT would be liquidated following increased debt and the economic impact of the COVID-19 pandemic. On 24 July 2020, the Government of Antigua and Barbuda secured an order for administration for LIAT and named Cleveland Seaforth of BDO as administrator of the company. Seaforth was given a 120-day deadline to devise a restructuring plan and present it to the Eastern Caribbean Supreme Court.

LIAT ceased operations on 24 January 2024.

== History ==
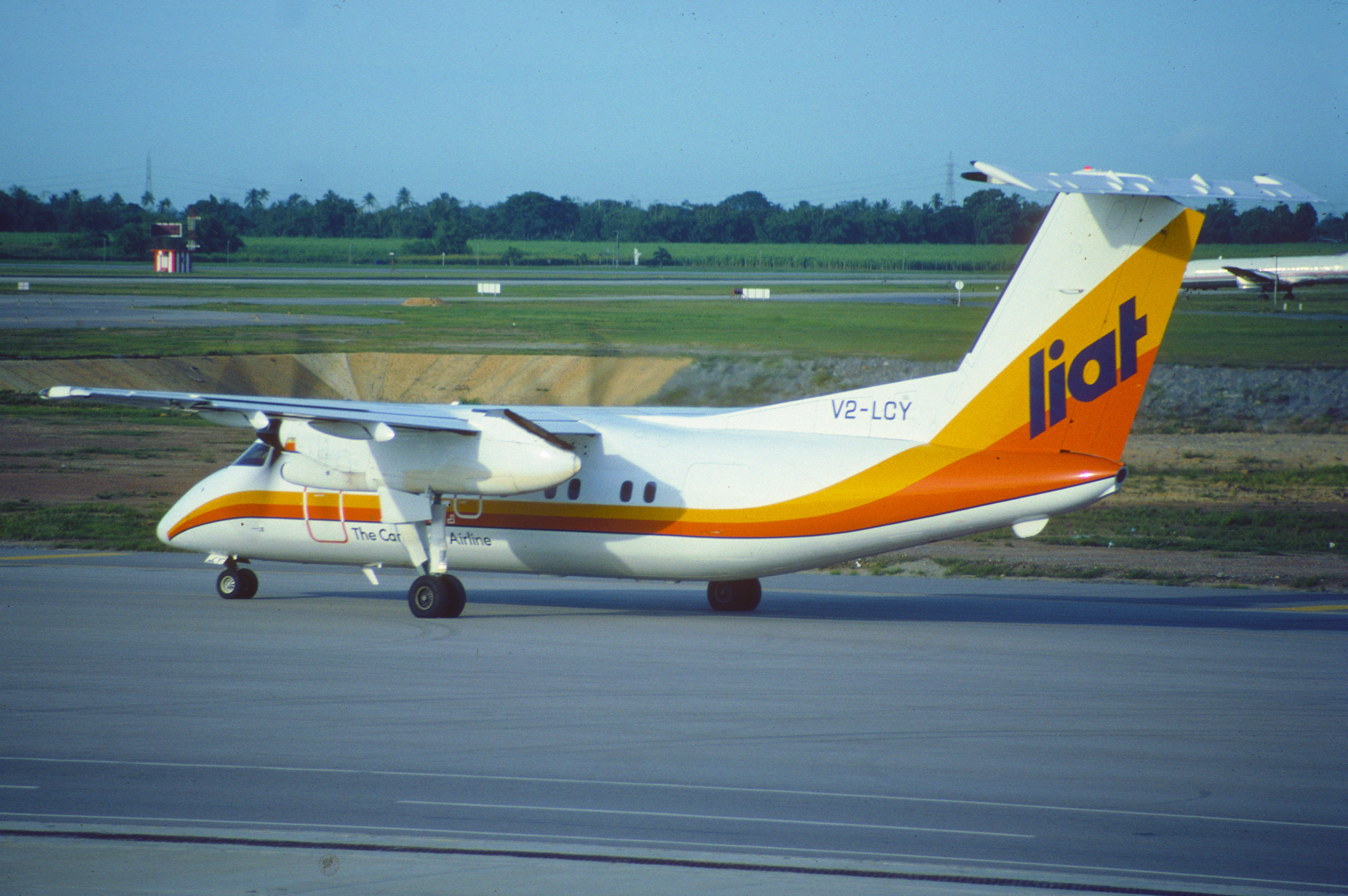
A former LIAT De Havilland Canada Dash 8-100 in pre-merger livery at Piarco International Airport in 2001.

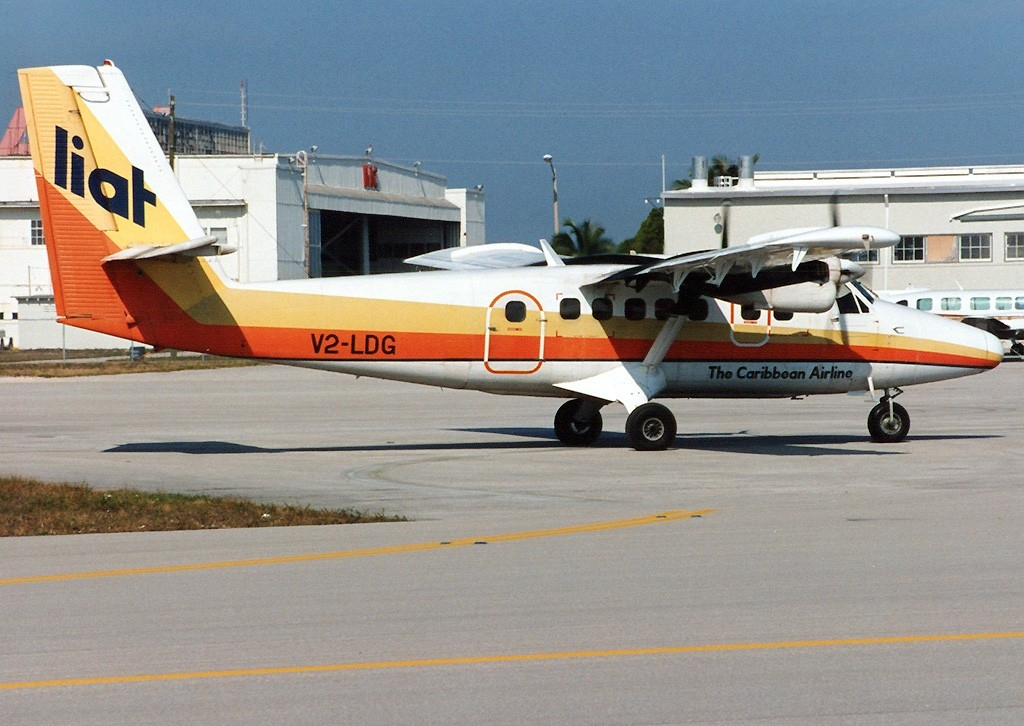
A former LIAT de Havilland Canada DHC-6 Twin Otter in 1995.

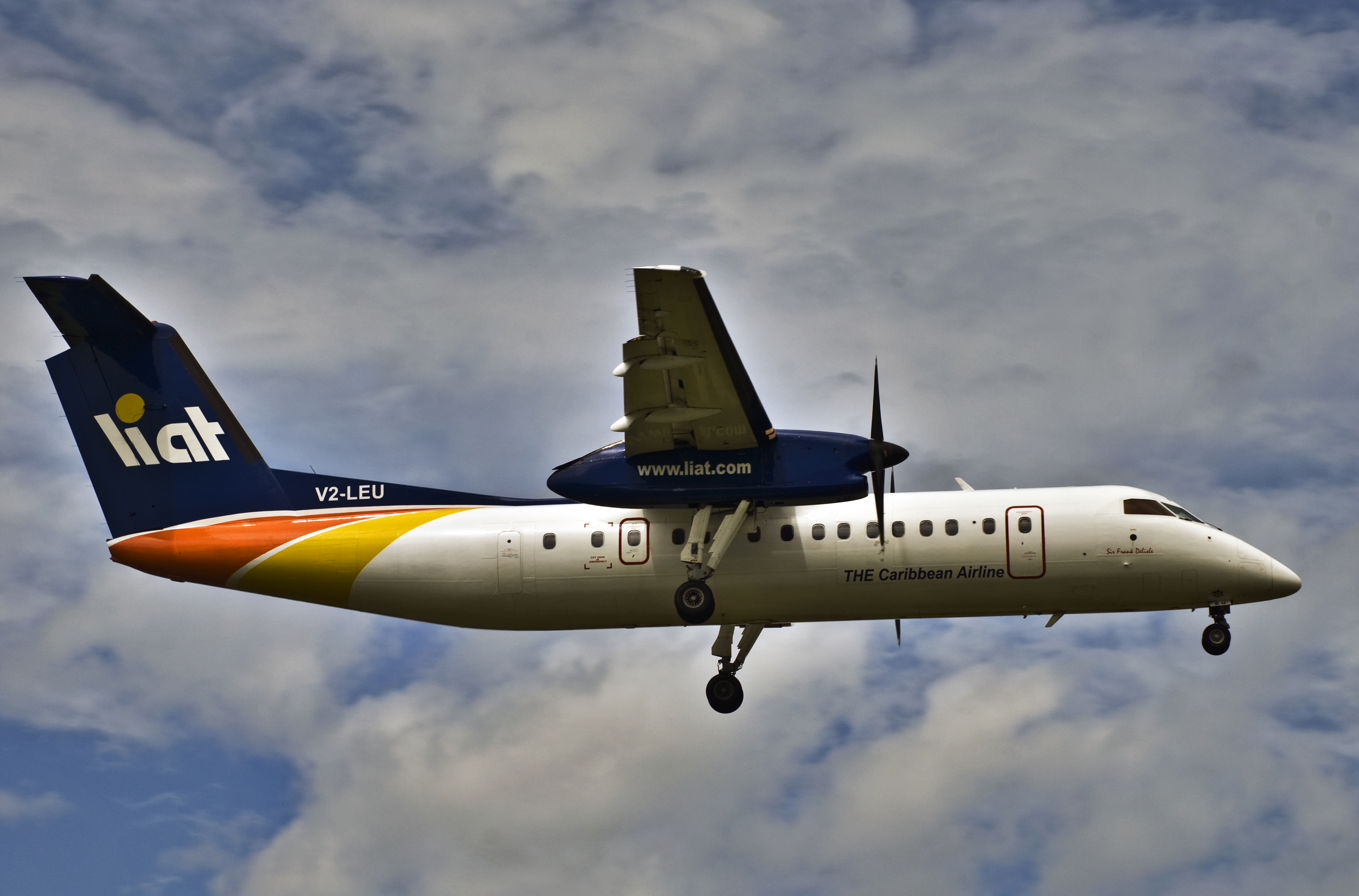
A former LIAT De Havilland Canada Dash 8-300 in 2011.

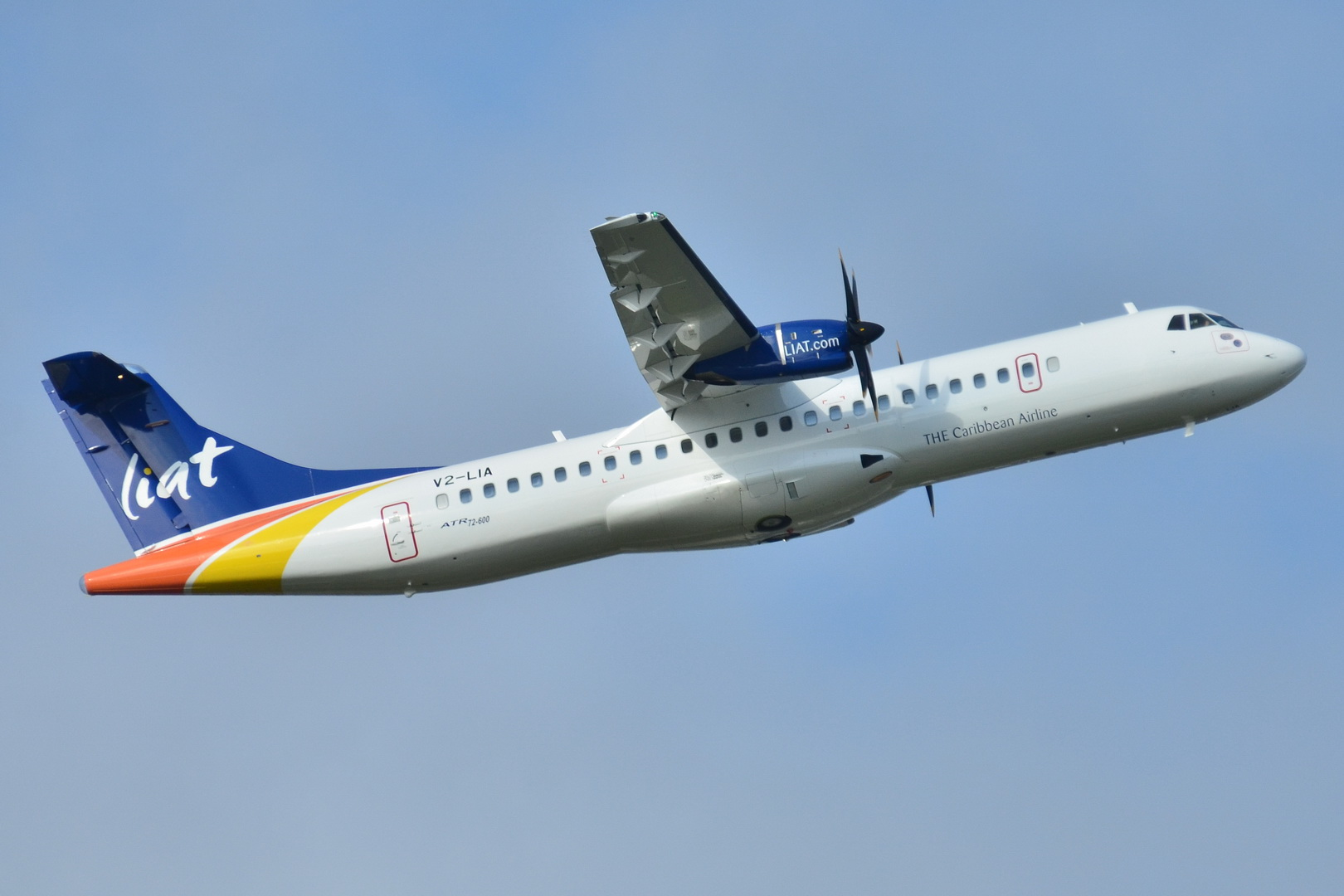
A former LIAT ATR 72-600, wearing the airline's last livery, in 2013.

=== Early years ===
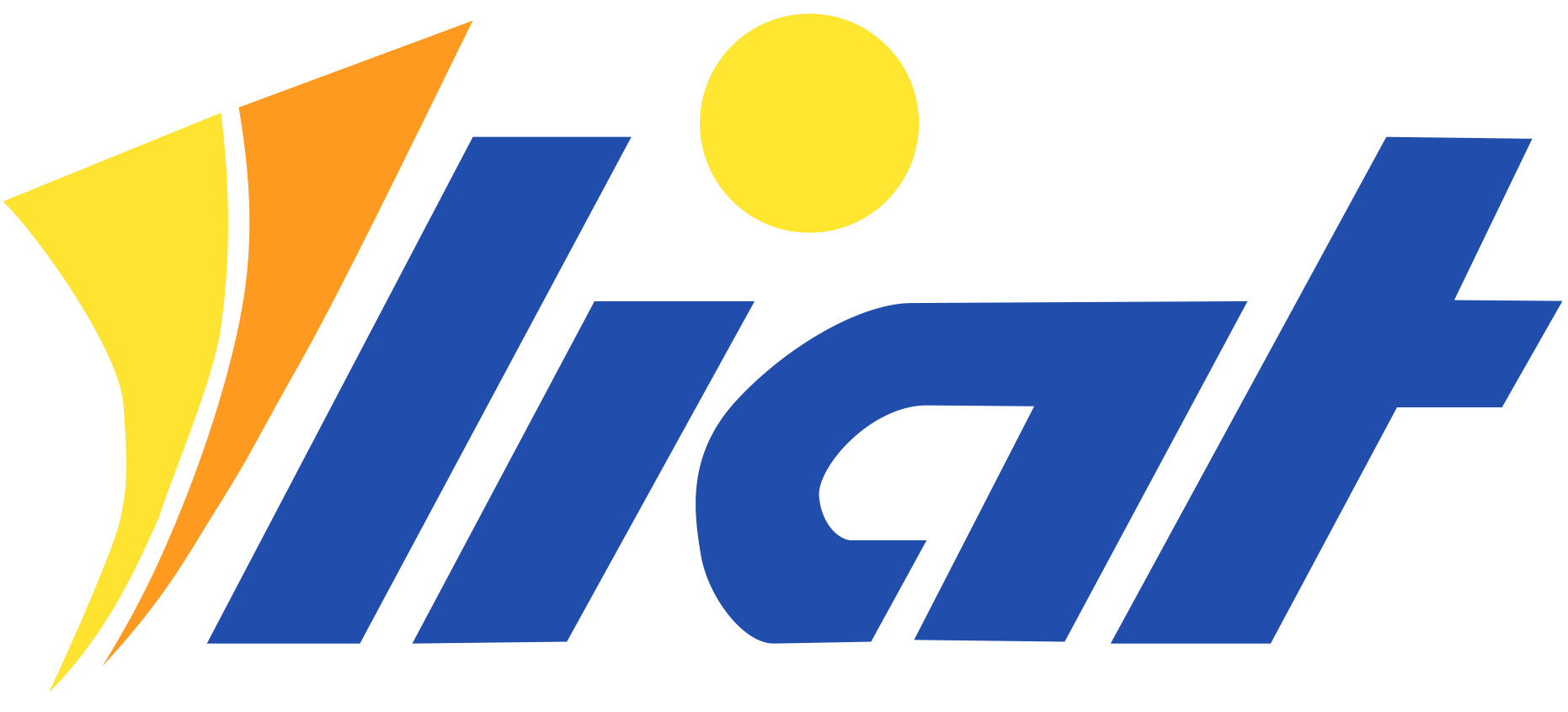
Former logo of Liat

Leeward Islands Air Transport Services was founded by the late Kittitian (now Sir) Frank Delisle in Montserrat on 20 October 1956 and began flying with a single Piper Apache operating between Antigua and Montserrat. With the acquisition in 1957, of 75 percent of the airline by the larger, better known BWIA, LIAT was able to expand to other Caribbean destinations and to obtain new aircraft types, such as the Beechcraft Bonanza and de Havilland Heron. Hawker Siddeley HS 748s came in 1965, due to the airline's decision to phase out the Herons. In 1968, LIAT was operating some flights via an agreement with Eastern Air Lines to provide passenger feed at this U.S.-based air carrier's hub located in San Juan, Puerto Rico and was flying "Eastern Partner" service between San Juan and Antigua, St. Kitts and St. Maarten.

LIAT was not always an all-propeller aircraft airline. After Court Line, a UK-based air carrier, obtained 75 percent of the airline in 1971, LIAT entered the jet age, using stretched British Aircraft Corporation BAC One-Eleven series 500 twin jets provided by Court Line for their busier Caribbean routes. Smaller Britten-Norman Islander STOL-capable (short take-off and landing) twin prop aircraft were operated during this time as well as 48-passenger seat Hawker Siddeley HS 748 "Avro" turboprops. LIAT operated the stretched version of the British-manufactured BAC One-Eleven, being the series 500 model, which was comparable to McDonnell Douglas DC-9-30 being flown during the late 1960s and early 1970s, by a competing airline, Puerto Rico-based Caribair (Puerto Rico). The BAC One-Eleven jets were supplied to LIAT by U.K.-based Court Line. According to a 1973 LIAT route map, the airline was operating scheduled BAC One-Eleven series 500 jet service at this time from Antigua, Barbados, Caracas, Venezuela, Fort-de-France, Martinique, Kingston, Jamaica, Port of Spain, Trinidad, St. Croix, U.S. Virgin Islands, St. Lucia (via Vigie Airport which is now George F.L. Charles Airport), St. Maarten, San Juan, Puerto Rico, and Tobago.

Court Line went bankrupt in August 1974, and the BAC One-Elevens were removed from the LIAT fleet. In order to keep the airline flying, the governments of 11 Caribbean nations stepped in and acquired the airline. The jets were replaced with a series of smaller types, such as the de Havilland Canada DHC-6 Twin Otter STOL (short take-off and landing) turboprop. By late 1979, LIAT was operating three aircraft types including the 48-passenger seat Hawker Siddeley HS 748 "Avro" turboprop as well as the 9-passenger seat Britten-Norman Islander and the 18-passenger seat Britten-Norman Trislander with the latter two aircraft having STOL capability for short runways.

The 1980s were a decade of growth for the airline. By 1986, many daily flights were operated to Luis Muñoz Marín International Airport in San Juan, Puerto Rico, as well as other regions that the airline had never flown to. Faster de Havilland Canada DHC-8-100 Dash 8 turboprops were acquired to reduce flight times systemwide.

In November 1995, LIAT was partially privatized, to save it from bankruptcy once again. LIAT also began operating the larger 50-seater de Havilland Canada DHC-8-300 Dash 8 turboprop.

=== Development since the 2000s ===
In June 2013, LIAT received its first ATR 72 series 600 aircraft (registration V2-LIA). The airline completed its transition from the Dash 8 fleet to an all ATR fleet in 2016.

In January 2007, the airline announced an intended merger with Caribbean Star Airlines, and they entered into a commercial alliance, involving the flying of a combined schedule. All flights were marketed as LIAT, although the airlines continued to operate separately using their own air operators' certificates, until after completion of the merger. The merged airline was planning to use the LIAT brand with a merged fleet which is standardized on the Bombardier Dash 8 Q300. However, in June 2007, the shareholder governments of Barbados, Antigua, and St. Vincent gave the go-ahead to the board of directors to buy out the assets of Caribbean Star instead. LIAT purchased Caribbean Star Airlines on 24 October 2007, and five of the Caribbean Star's DHC-8 aircraft were then transferred to LIAT. As another result of the merger, LIAT changed its slogan to "LIAT, Star of the Caribbean", which was used as the slogan for a short time, and was then changed back to "The Caribbean Airline".

On 27 June 2020, the Prime Minister of Antigua and Barbuda announced that LIAT would be liquidated following a series of unsuccessful months due to COVID-19. The airline was reformed as a new entity that provides vital connections between the Caribbean islands.

LIAT suspended all their operations on 24 January 2024, resulting in the layoffs of more than 90 employees.

== Corporate affairs ==
=== Ownership ===
The airline is owned by eleven Caribbean governments, with three being the major shareholders: Barbados, Antigua & Barbuda, and St. Vincent and the Grenadines along with Dominica (94.7%); other Caribbean governments, private shareholders, and employees (5.3%). It has 667 employees (in December 2018). The government of the Republic of Trinidad and Tobago, which also is the majority shareholder along with Jamaica of another regional carrier, Caribbean Airlines, the national airline of Trinidad and Tobago, is a minority shareholder in LIAT. However, it allows the Government of Barbados to use these shares by proxy.

The airline is currently in Administration as the Government of Antigua and Barbuda seeks to take over and restructure the airline. However, the ownership has not changed as of March 2021.

=== CEOs ===
On April 22, 2014, British aviation executive David Evans was appointed as CEO of LIAT. Evans' appointment came weeks after the shareholders mandated Chairman Jean Holder to study the future of the airline for 100 days, and shareholder Prime Minister Ralph Gonsalves had boasted that more than 200 people had applied for the position. Evans resigned on April 13, 2016, amidst a heated meeting with the board of directors, leaving LIAT yet again without a CEO. In August 2017, Julie Reifer-Jones was appointed CEO of the company. She was the first female CEO of the airline and the only female CEO of an airline in the Caribbean. On 31 July 2020, Reifer-Jones announced her departure in a letter to employees. The airline is currently in administration so a CEO has not been appointed.

=== Headquarters ===
The airline is headquartered in Antigua. The engineering and flight operations department are located at the V. C. Bird International Airport in Saint George Parish, Antigua. The corporate headquarters which includes the call centre and customer relations departments are located at the Sealy Building on Sir George Walter Highway. The commercial department is located in St. Michael, Barbados.

=== Criticism ===
LIAT has a mixed reputation among both locals and visitors to and from the Caribbean Islands. Their flights often operate irregularly, with inconsistent arrival and departure. Baggage is often misdirected or not loaded entirely. They are known for having very poor customer service, late departures, flights cancellation, and their staff are criticized as surly and unhelpful. These problems were exacerbated with the 2010 strikes and again during the labor disputes in 2013 and 2017 – with many flights canceled and passengers stranded and unable to receive refunds. The management and head operators of the airline make it clear that they are not responsible for any flight cancellations or stranded passengers. West Indies cricket players used to call LIAT "Luggage In Another Town."

=== Awards ===
- 2007 – The "Caribbean's Leading Budget / No Frills Airline" – by the World Travel Awards

== Destinations ==
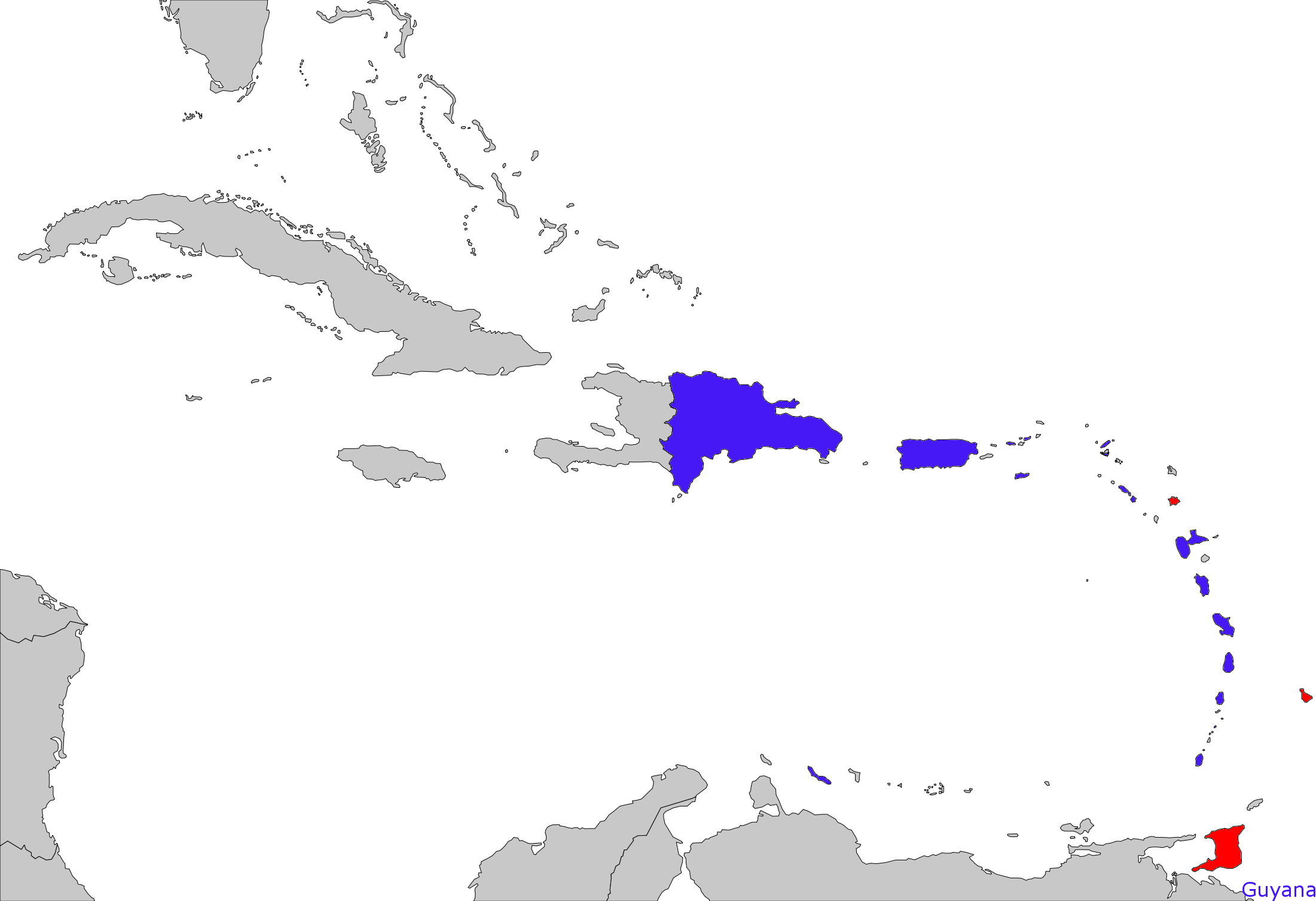
LIAT destinations. Key: LIAT Bases LIAT destinations

LIAT provided service in the Eastern Caribbean region from Puerto Rico in the north to Georgetown, Guyana, in the south, linking the chain of islands in between.

=== Codeshare agreements ===
Until 2008, LIAT's services to Anguilla, Antigua, Dominica, St. Lucia, St. Kitts, Nevis, Montserrat, and St. Vincent were codeshared with Carib Aviation, which also used Antigua and Barbuda as its hub. The agreement was canceled due to Carib Aviation's discontinuation of all flights effective September 30, 2008.

LIAT announced in 2018 that it would join the Caribsky Alliance with Air Antilles and WINAIR. The alliance would make it easier for travel by having codeshare agreements between the three carriers.

The airline formerly maintained codeshare agreements with:

- BWIA West Indies Airways
- Carib Aviation
- Caribbean Helicopters

=== Cargo services ===
LIAT also provided cargo services, with its service called Quikpak. This service provided Airport-to-Airport & Door-to-Door, customs-cleared delivery service throughout the Caribbean. The delivery time was typically within one or two days, and it was guaranteed by the LIAT staff.

LIAT would also begin all-cargo services with a Dash 8-100, which was to be converted from a passenger aircraft to a full-fledged cargo aircraft. Once the new cargo service came on stream, customers for the first time would be able to book cargo online on the company's website. The introduction of its new cargo service was planned for later in 2011.

== Fleet ==
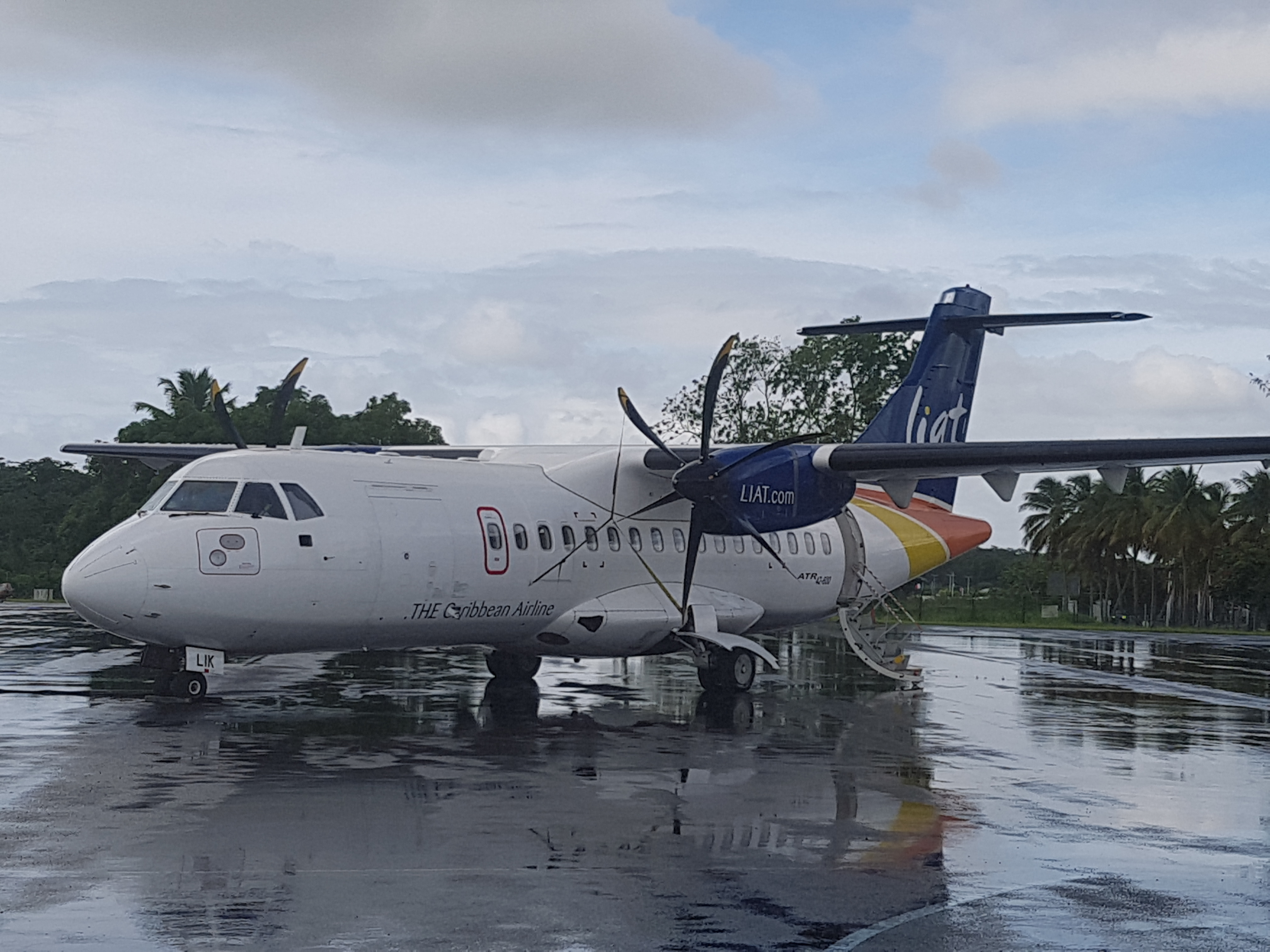
LIAT ATR 42-600

=== Final fleet ===
At the time of its closure in January 2024, the LIAT fleet consisted of the following aircraft:

LIAT fleet
Aircraft	In fleet	Orders	Passengers	Notes
ATR 42-600	1	—	48	V2-LIG is leased from Nordic Aviation Capital.
Total	1	—		

=== Fleet development ===
Early in 2013, the airline announced plans to acquire two entirely new types of turboprop aircraft, the 48-seat ATR 42 series 600 and 68-seat ATR 72 series 600 to replace its aging fleet of Dash 8's, both purchased directly by the airline and acquired during their merger with Caribbean Star. The introduction of these new prop-jets would mark the first time that LIAT operated ATR aircraft. LIAT began accepting deliveries in mid-2013. Later in 2013 then CEO, Capt. Ian Brunton apologized for what he described as a 'meltdown' around a re-fleeting exercise, with LIAT changing aircraft from Dash-8 types to ATR 42 and ATR 72 types. The troubles, which stranded thousands of passengers across LIAT's 1,300 miles of network, started in early August and continued for some two months while LIAT struggled with crewing both types and deliveries of the new aircraft. To compound the problems, an engine of one of the new aircraft took a week to be replaced, and one of the new aircraft was chartered to the Prime Minister of Taiwan in the middle of the debacle. The CEO blamed the numerous flight delays and cancellations on "unscheduled maintenance, crew shortages, bad weather, airport limitations, obtaining licenses for operating our new ATR aircraft, Tropical Storm Chantal, strong surface winds, unfavorable weather conditions, airport limitations, and runway lights". Capt. Brunton resigned in late September, with his departure on October 1, 2013.

=== Previously operated ===
The LIAT retired fleet includes the following aircraft types:

- ATR 72-600
- Beechcraft twin Bonanza
- de Havilland Canada Dash 8-100
- Bombardier Dash 8-300
- BAC 1-11-500 - The BAC One-Eleven series 500 was the only jet aircraft type ever operated by LIAT.
- Britten-Norman BN-2 Islander
- Britten-Norman BN-2A-III Trislander
- de Havilland Canada DHC-6 Twin Otter
- de Havilland DH-114 Heron
- Embraer EMB-110 Bandeirante
- Hawker Siddeley HS 748

== Accidents and incidents ==
- On August 23, 1959, a LIAT de Havilland DH-114 Heron 2B crashed on landing in St. Kitts. The aircraft was en route between St. Johns, Antigua, and St. Kitts. After landing, it overran the runway and was damaged beyond repair. No one was seriously injured and there were no fatalities.
- LIAT Flight 319: On August 4, 1986, a LIAT de Havilland Canada DHC-6 Twin Otter crashed into the Caribbean Sea. The aircraft was en route between St. Lucia and St. Vincent when it crashed due to poor weather conditions, while on approach. After a full day's search failed to find a trace of the Twin Otter, all of the 11 passengers and two crew were presumed dead.
- On December 2, 2010, LIAT flight LI362, a Bombardier Dash 8-Q300 (DHC-8-300) carrying 24 passengers, en route to San Juan, Puerto Rico, made an emergency landing at the V.C. Bird International Airport in Antigua after losing a wheel from one of the main landing gear. As a precautionary measure, emergency services were placed on standby. The aircraft landed safely with no major damage or any injuries to the passengers or crew.
- On August 25, 2013, LIAT flight LI774, a Bombardier Dash 8-Q300 (DHC-8-300) carrying 43 passengers, en route from Guyana to Barbados made an emergency landing at the Grantley Adams International Airport in Barbados after losing a wheel from one of the main landing gear on takeoff from Guyana. The aircraft landed safely with no major damage or any injuries to the passengers or crew.

== In popular culture ==
- Scenes of the airline are featured in season eight of the television programme Banged Up Abroad.
