= Epicurean (supermarket) =

Supermarket chain in Antigua and Barbuda

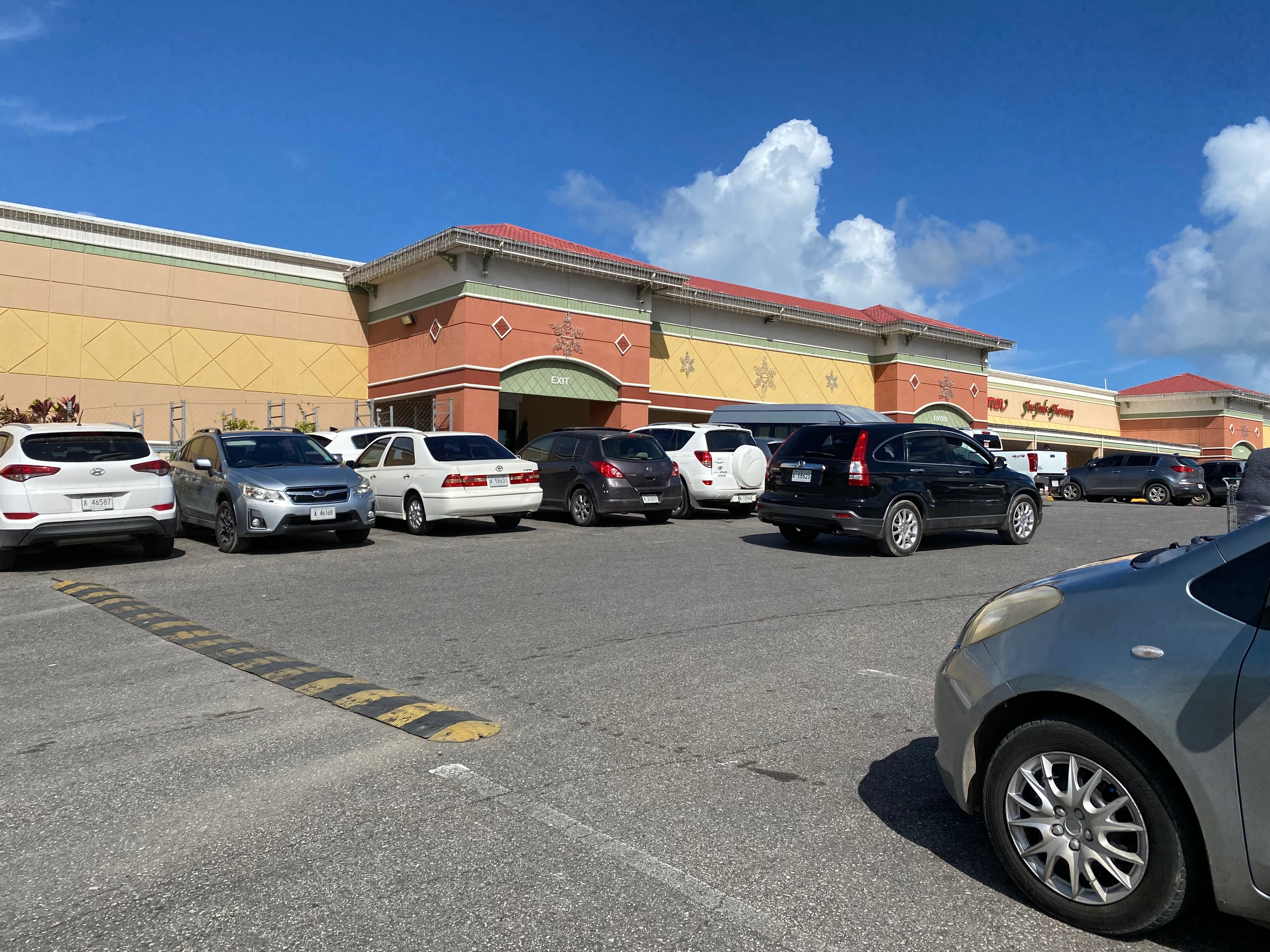
- Flagship location on Friars Hill Road
- Industry: Retail (grocery)
- Headquarters: Antigua and Barbuda
- Number of locations: 2
- Owner: Pastrys Limited
- Website: http://www.epicureanantigua.com

Epicurean is a supermarket chain in Antigua owned by Pastrys Limited. Epicurean is considered to be one of the largest retail companies in the country and has two locations, one on Friars Hill Road near St. John's and another in Jolly Harbour. The chain targets both locals and tourists, providing everyday goods as well as yacht provisioning services, pharmacies, and bakeries. Epicurean is part of the IGA network. Its flagship location on Friars Hill Road was opened in 2010, being described by ABS as the largest supermarket on the island.
