= Sir George Walter Highway =

Highway in Antigua

Coordinates: 17°7′22.12″N 61°48′51.18″W

Road 25
- Sir George Walter Highway

Route information
- Length: 5.1 km (3.2 mi)

Major junctions
- From: Camp Blizzard in Osbourn
- To: Road 20 (Sir Sydney Walling Highway) in St. Johnston, St. John's

Location
- Country: Antigua and Barbuda

Highway system
- Roads in Antigua and Barbuda

Sir George Walter Highway (also known as Airport Road) is a highway in Antigua. The highway is one of the busiest in the country, with 32,000 people (about seventy-five percent of the driving population) using this road along with Friars Hill Road every day. The highway links the Central Plain metropolitan area to V. C. Bird International Airport and various other facilities in Osbourn. The highway is named after former Antiguan premier Sir George Walter. The road underwent major renovations in 2020 that added new markings and refurbished the asphalt surface. The highway is of high economic importance, with various government agencies and aviation related facilities based around it.

The road commences at the junction of Jabberwock Road and Hospitality Drive near Camp Blizzard. The road continues southbound towards the roundabout with Pavilion Drive at the airport (1.2 km). A second junction with an unnamed road is present at 1.4 km. The road continues to the junction with Old Parham Road and Palmetto Drive at 4.0 km. The road ends at the roundabout with Sir Sydney Walling Highway and Mahico Drive at 5.1 km.

== Junctions ==
Parish	Location	km	mi	Destinations	Notes
Saint George	Osbourn	0.0	0.0	Jabberwock Road and Hospitality Drive	
Saint George	Osbourn	1.2	0.75	Pavilion Drive roundabout	
Saint George	Osbourn	1.4	0.87	Unnamed road	
Saint John	Skyline	4.0	2.5	Old Parham Road and Palmetto Drive	
Saint John	St. Johnston	5.1	3.2	Sir Sydney Walling Highway and Mahico Drive roundabout	
1.000 mi = 1.609 km; 1.000 km = 0.621 mi
