= Osbourn =

Village in Antigua and Barbuda

- Settlement
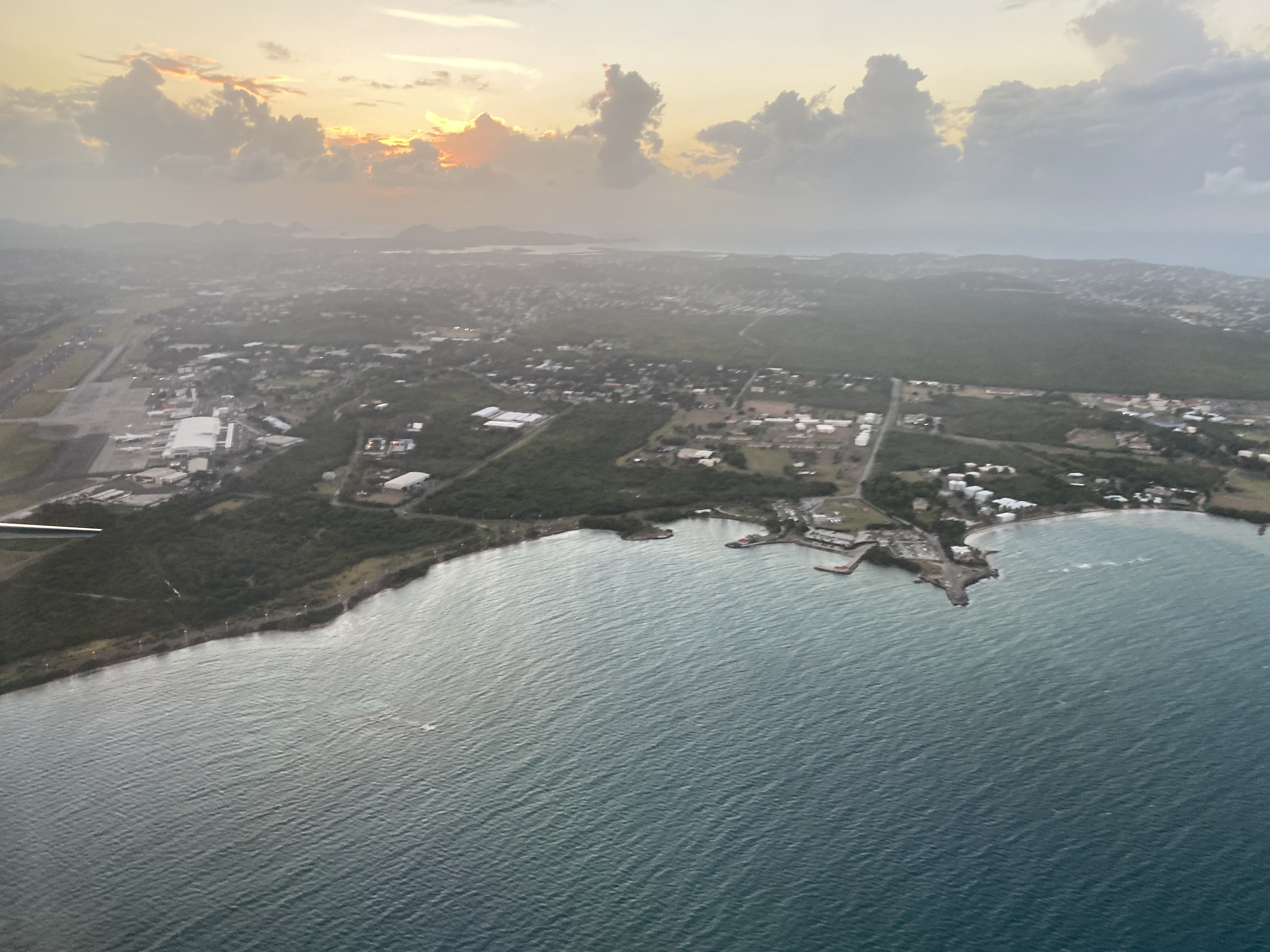
- Skyline of Osbourn, with V.C. Bird International Airport to the left.
- Interactive map of the Osbourn main place
- Coordinates: 17°8′31.24″N 61°47′41.39″W
- Country: Antigua and Barbuda
- Island: Antigua
- Major Division: Major Division of Piggots

Government
  - Member of Parliament: Algernon Watts, Charles Fernandez

Area
  - Total: 4.85 km^{2} (1.87 sq mi)
- Elevation: 16 m (52 ft)

Population (2011)
  - Total: 35
- Time zone: UTC-4 (AST)
- Airport: V.C. Bird International Airport
- Parliamentary Constituency: Saint George, Saint John’s Rural North

Osbourn is a settlement in Antigua and Barbuda, home to V.C. Bird International Airport.

== Geography ==
Nearby villages and settlements include Piggotts, New Winthorpes and Potters in Saint George, and Cedar Grove, Parham and Cassada Gardens elsewhere. The settlement is the northern area of Saint George Parish.

== Transportation ==
V. C. Bird International Airport is located in Osbourn.

== Demographics ==
=== Census 2011 ===
Ethnicity
Q48 Ethnic	Counts	%
African descendent	24	69.70%
Caucasian/White	8	24.24%
Mixed (Other)	1	3.03%
Don't know/Not stated	1	3.03%
Total	35	100.00%

Religion
Q49 Religion	Counts	%
Anglican	1	3.03%
Baptist	15	42.42%
Methodist	1	3.03%
None/no religion	5	15.15%
Roman Catholic	11	30.30%
Don't know/Not stated	2	6.06%
Total	35	100.00%

Country of birth
Q58. Country of birth	Counts	%
Antigua and Barbuda	21	60.61%
Other Caribbean countries	1	3.03%
Canada	1	3.03%
Monsterrat	1	3.03%
Trinidad and Tobago	1	3.03%
United Kingdom	2	6.06%
USA	3	9.09%
USVI United States Virgin Islands	1	3.03%
Not Stated	3	9.09%
Total	35	100.00%

Country of citizenship
Q71 Country of Citizenship 1	Counts	%
Antigua and Barbuda	33	93.94%
Not Stated	2	6.06%
Total	35	100.00%

Country of second/dual citizenship
Q71 Country of Citizenship 2	Counts	%
Canada	1	8.33%
Guyana	1	8.33%
St. Lucia	1	8.33%
Trinidad and Tobago	1	8.33%
United Kingdom	4	33.33%
USA	4	33.33%
Total	13	100.00%
NotApp :	22	

== Climate ==
The climate of this city is a Tropical savanna climate (Koppen: Aw)

Climate data for Osbourn, Antigua and Barbuda (V. C. Bird International Airport)
Month	Jan	Feb	Mar	Apr	May	Jun	Jul	Aug	Sep	Oct	Nov	Dec	Year
Record high °C (°F)	31.2 (88.2)	31.8 (89.2)	32.9 (91.2)	32.7 (90.9)	34.1 (93.4)	32.9 (91.2)	33.5 (92.3)	34.9 (94.8)	34.3 (93.7)	33.2 (91.8)	32.6 (90.7)	31.5 (88.7)	34.9 (94.8)
Mean daily maximum °C (°F)	28.3 (82.9)	28.4 (83.1)	28.8 (83.8)	29.4 (84.9)	30.2 (86.4)	30.6 (87.1)	30.9 (87.6)	31.2 (88.2)	31.1 (88.0)	30.6 (87.1)	29.8 (85.6)	28.8 (83.8)	29.8 (85.6)
Daily mean °C (°F)	25.4 (77.7)	25.2 (77.4)	25.6 (78.1)	26.3 (79.3)	27.2 (81.0)	27.9 (82.2)	28.2 (82.8)	28.3 (82.9)	28.1 (82.6)	27.5 (81.5)	26.8 (80.2)	25.9 (78.6)	26.9 (80.4)
Mean daily minimum °C (°F)	22.4 (72.3)	22.2 (72.0)	22.7 (72.9)	23.4 (74.1)	24.5 (76.1)	25.3 (77.5)	25.3 (77.5)	25.5 (77.9)	25.0 (77.0)	24.4 (75.9)	23.9 (75.0)	23.0 (73.4)	24.0 (75.2)
Record low °C (°F)	15.5 (59.9)	16.6 (61.9)	17.0 (62.6)	16.6 (61.9)	17.8 (64.0)	19.7 (67.5)	20.6 (69.1)	19.3 (66.7)	20.0 (68.0)	20.0 (68.0)	17.7 (63.9)	16.1 (61.0)	15.5 (59.9)
Average precipitation mm (inches)	56.6 (2.23)	44.9 (1.77)	46.0 (1.81)	72.0 (2.83)	89.6 (3.53)	62.0 (2.44)	86.5 (3.41)	99.4 (3.91)	131.6 (5.18)	142.2 (5.60)	135.1 (5.32)	83.4 (3.28)	1,049.2 (41.31)
Average precipitation days (≥ 1.0 mm)	11.1	8.7	7.3	7.2	8.6	8.3	11.8	12.7	12.0	12.9	12.4	12.1	124.7
Source: Antigua/Barbuda Meteorological Services
