= Blackman's Estate =

- Village
- Interactive map of the Blackman's Estate main place
- Coordinates: 17°06′59.68″N 61°46′58.28″W
- Country: Antigua and Barbuda
- Parish: Saint George

Area
  - Total: 1.60 km^{2} (0.62 sq mi)

Population (2011)
  - Total: 0
  - Density: 0.0/km^{2} (0.0/sq mi)

Blackman's Estate is a village in Saint George, Antigua and Barbuda. In 2011, the village had a population of 0 over 1.60 square kilometres. Also known as Mount Lucie, the area was once home to a sugar plantation and mill established sometime in the seventeenth century. The mill's location was strategic as sugar could be shipped directly from the estate rather than having to travel overland. The village is located on Parham Harbour.

The area is primarily made up of woodlands, swamp, and mangroves with little deforestation. It is located in the limestone geologic region of the island and is at low to moderate risk for drought.

Blackman's located on Old Parham Road, about 3 kilometres from V. C. Bird International Airport, 1.5 kilometres from the Sir Vivian Richards Stadium, and 2 kilometres from central Parham.

The estate's windmill continues to stand and is located at 17°06′53.09″N 61°47′01.99″W. It is noted that in 1678 Lucie Blackman held a plantation in Antigua. In 1829 there were 138 slaves at the estate. In the 1856 census the area was listed as Mount Lucie and was home to 97 people in 34 homes, with an additional 3 unoccupied houses. The estate changed hands frequently and in 1941 was 107 acres producing 2,049 tons of sugar. The estate house was inhabited up until 1957. In 2016 the village was designated as an approved investment area for the Citizenship by Investment Programme.

There are no ponds or internal waterbodies in the village.
