= Ethnicity in Saint George, Antigua and Barbuda =

Saint George does not have a particularly ethnically diverse population compared to the rest of Antigua and Barbuda. In 2011, African descendants were the largest ethnic group in the parish, with 89.29% of the parish identifying with that group. The second largest group in the parish were Mixed black/white and other mixed groups, comprising 1.14% and 5.15% of the parishes population respectively.

== Ethnic makeup of the population ==
In 2011, 0.42% of the population didn't know or didn't state their ethnicity.

=== African descendant ===
African descendants are the majority of the people living in Saint George. 0.19% of African descendants were born in Africa, 0.04% were born in "other Latin American or North American countries", 76.71% were born in Antigua and Barbuda, 0.97% were born in "other Caribbean countries", 0.33% were born in Canada, 0.01% were born in "other Asian countries", 0.03% were born in "other European countries", 3.36% were born in Dominica, 0.21% were born in the Dominican Republic, 3.83% were born in Guyana, 3.92% were born in Jamaica, 0.86% were born in Montserrat, 0.52% were born in St. Kitts and Nevis, 1.59% were born in Saint Lucia, 0.79% were born in St. Vincent and the Grenadines, 0.43% were born in Trinidad and Tobago, 0.79% were born in the United Kingdom, 3.43% were born in the United States, 0.59% were born in the U.S. Virgin Islands, and 1.38% did not state.

=== Caucasian/White ===
White people make up 0.97% of the population of Saint George. 1.37% of white people were born in Africa, 1.37% in "other Latin American or North American countries", 20.55% in Antigua and Barbuda, 4.11% in "other Caribbean countries", 12.33% in Canada, 4.11% in "other Asian countries", 12.33% in "other European countries", 2.74% in the Dominican Republic, 1.37% in Guyana, 1.37% in St. Kitts and Nevis, 1.37% in St. Lucia, 4.11% in Trinidad and Tobago, 21.92% in the United Kingdom, and 10.96% in the United States.

=== East Indian/Indian ===
Indian people make up 1.01% of the population of Saint George. 14.47% were born in Antigua and Barbuda, 1.32% in other Caribbean countries, 14.47% in other Asian countries, 2.63% in other European countries, 46.05% in Guyana, 3.95% in Jamaica, 2.63% in St. Vincent and the Grenadines, 9.21% in Trinidad and Tobago, 2.63% in the United States, and 2.63% not stated.

=== Mixed (Black/White) ===
Mixed black/white people make up 1.14% of the population of Saint George. 1.16% were born in other Latin or North American countries, 55.81% in Antigua and Barbuda, 3.49% in other Caribbean countries, 1.16% in Canada, 2.33% in other European countries, 4.65% in Dominica, 3.49% in the Dominican Republic, 6.98% in Guyana, 3.49% in Jamaica, 1.16% in Montserrat, 1.16% in St. Kitts and Nevis, 1.16% in St. Lucia, 1.16% in St. Vincent and the Grenadines, 2.33% in Trinidad and Tobago, 4.65% in the United Kingdom, and 5.81% in the United States.

=== Mixed (Other) ===
Other mixed people make up 5.15% of the population of Saint George. 0.77% were born in other Latin or North American countries, 53.35% in Antigua and Barbuda, 3.09% in other Caribbean countries, 1.55% in Canada, 9.28% in Dominica, 15.98% in Guyana, 3.61% in Jamaica, 0.26% in Montserrat, 0.77% in St. Kitts and Nevis, 1.80% in Saint Lucia, 4.90% in Trinidad and Tobago, 0.26% in the United Kingdom, 2.32% in the United States, and 2.06% not stated.

=== Hispanic ===
Hispanic people make up 0.97% of the population of Saint George. 5.48% were born in other Latin or North American countries, 15.07% in Antigua and Barbuda, 10.96% in other Caribbean countries, 67.12% in the Dominican Republic, and 1.37% in the United States.

=== Syrian/Lebanese ===
Syrian/Lebanese people make up 0.37% of the population of Saint George. 3.57% were born in other Latin or North American countries, 75.00% in Antigua and Barbuda, 10.71% in Syria, 3.57% in Trinidad and Tobago, and 7.14% in the United States.

=== Other ===
Other groups make up 0.68% of the population of Saint George. 21.57% were born in Antigua and Barbuda, 19.61% in other Asian countries, 19.61% in Dominica, 7.84% in the Dominican Republic, 11.76% in Guyana, 1.96% in Jamaica, 7.84% in Trinidad and Tobago, 7.84% in the United States, and 1.96% not stated.
