= Health in Saint George =

Health in Saint George refers to the overall health of the population of the parish of Saint George, Antigua and Barbuda.

== Allergies ==
In 2011, 7.85% of people had allergies. 6.32% of men had allergies, and 9.20% of women had allergies. 7.29% of black people had allergies, 7.35% of white people, 4.84% of East Indians, 13.33% of mixed black/white people, 16.62% of other mixed people, 2.99% of Hispanic people, 20.00% of Syrian/Lebanese people, and 11.11% of other ethnic groups. 8.88% of young people (0-17) had allergies, 8.10% of working age people, and 4.28% of 60+ older persons. 5.51% of people aged 0–4 had allergies, 8.56% of those aged 5–9, 9.89% of those 10-14, and 11.34% of those 15-19.

== Asthma ==
In 2011, 5.25% of people had asthma. 6.32% of men had asthma, and 9.20% of women had asthma. 7.29% of black people had asthma, 7.35% of white people had asthma, 4.84% of East Indian people had asthma, 13.33% of mixed black/white people had asthma, 16.62% of other mixed people had asthma, 2.99% of Hispanic people has asthma, 20.00% of Syrian/Lebanese people had asthma, and 11.11% of other people had asthma. 8.88% of young people had asthma, 8.10% of working age people had asthma, and 4.28% of older persons had asthma. 5.51% of those 0-4 had asthma, 8.56% of those 5-9 had asthma, 9.89% of those 10-14, and 11.34% of those 15-19.

== Diabetes ==
In 2011, 6.22% of people had diabetes. 5.02% of men had diabetes, and 7.27% of women had diabetes. 6.42% of black people had diabetes, 4.41% of white people, 8.06% of East Indians, 4.00% of mixed black/white people, 4.15% of other mixed people, 2.99% of Hispanic people, 12.00% of Syrian/Lebanese people, and 4.44% of other people. 0.16% of those 0-17 had diabetes, 4.68% of working age people, and 27.46% of older persons. 0.18% of people aged 10–14 had diabetes, and 0.37% of people aged 15–19 had diabetes.

== Other diseases ==
=== Heart disease ===
In 2011, 0.69% of the population had heart disease. 0.60% of men had heart disease, and 0.76% of women had heart disease.

=== HIV/AIDS ===
In 2011, 0.02% of the population of the population had AIDs. This is similar to the percentage in Saint Paul or St. John's City. Out of the 6,791 people asked, only one person had AIDs in the parish.
