= Old Parham Road =

Highway in Antigua

Coordinates: 17°06′39.3″N 61°47′05.2″W

Road 19
- Old Parham Road
- Eastbound in Piggotts, 2023

Route information
- Length: 10.6 km (6.6 mi)

Major junctions
- From: Government House Roundabout in St. John's
- To: Road 20 (Sir Sydney Walling Highway) in Vernons

Location
- Country: Antigua and Barbuda

Highway system
- Roads in Antigua and Barbuda

Old Parham Road is a highway (Note: Officially designated as such by the government.) in Antigua. The highway passes through Saint John, Saint George, and Saint Peter and is one of the most important east–west highways on the island. It traverses a wide variety of landscapes including urban and rural settlement, agricultural lands, mangroves, and forests. It also serves as the basis of many constituency boundaries. Major settlements on the highway include St. John's, Cassada Gardens, Piggotts, Fitches Creek, Paynters, Parham, and Vernons. Major junctions include Wireless Road and Simon Bolivar Drive (1.4 km), Sir George Walter Highway (3.0 km), Burma Road (3.6 km), Paynters Road (4.1 km), Fitches Creek Drive and Coconut Drive (4.7 km), St. George's Drive (6.0 km), unnamed road to Sir Vivian Richards Stadium (6.9 km), unnamed road in Parham (8.4 km), and a second unnamed road in Parham (8.9 km). It terminates at the Sir Sydney Walling Highway in Vernons (10.6 km).

== Junctions ==
Parish	Location	km	mi	Destinations	Notes
Saint John	St. John's	0.0	0.0	Government House Roundabout	
Saint John	St. John's	1.4	0.87	Wireless Road and Simon Bolivar Drive	
Saint John	Cassada Gardens	3.0	1.9	Sir George Walter Highway	
Saint George	Piggotts	3.6	2.2	Burma Road	
Saint George	Piggotts	4.1	2.5	Paynters Road	
Saint George	Paynters	4.7	2.9	Fitches Creek Drive and Coconut Drive	
Saint George	Fitches Creek	6.0	3.7	St. George's Drive	
Saint George	Fitches Creek	6.9	4.3	Unnamed road #1	
Saint Peter	Parham	8.4	5.2	Unnamed road #2	
Saint Peter	Parham	8.9	5.5	Unnamed road #3	
Saint Peter	Vernons	10.6	6.6	Sir Sydney Walling Highway and Jonas Road	
1.000 mi = 1.609 km; 1.000 km = 0.621 mi
