= Boon Point =

Northernmost point of Antigua

Location of Boon Point within Antigua and Barbuda

Boon Point is the northernmost point on the island of Antigua. It is located to the west of Humphry's Bay at 17°10′0″N 61°50′0″W, close to the settlement of Cedar Grove.
