= Paynters =

- Village
- Paynters Paradise in 2023 from Old Parham Road
- Interactive map of Paynters
- Coordinates: 17°06′57″N 61°47′49″W
- Country: Antigua and Barbuda
- Parish: Saint George

Area
  - Total: 2.4 km^{2} (0.93 sq mi)

Population (2011)
  - Total: 326

Paynters is a village in Saint George, Antigua and Barbuda. It had a population of 326 people in 2011 and is considered a part of the larger community of Sugar Factory. Most of its population resides in the Paynters Paradise development.

== Geography ==
According to the Antigua and Barbuda Statistics Division, the village had a total area of 2.4 square kilometres in 2011.

== Demographics ==
There were 326 people living in Paynters as of the 2011 census. The village was 89.29% African, 4.87% other mixed, 2.60% Indian, 1.62% mixed black/white, and 1.62% unknown. The population was born in different countries, including Antigua and Barbuda (71.43%), Guyana (13.31%), the United States (3.25%), and Dominica (3.25%). The population had diverse religious affiliations, including Pentecostalists (15.91%), Anglicans (14.61%), and Catholics (9.74%).
