= Organisation for National Development =

Antiguan political party

Organisation for National Development is a political party in Antigua and Barbuda. The party was formed in January 2003, by a group that left the United Progressive Party. Founders included Glentis Goodwin (chairman of the new party), Melford Nicholas and Valerie Samuel.

Following its formation, OND denounced the UPP leadership as 'corrupt and dictatorial'.
