= Sydney Walling =

Antiguan cricketer (1907–2009)

Sir Sydney Walling (12 July 1907 – 8 October 2009) was an Antiguan cricketer who played for Antigua from the 1920s to the 1950s.

Despite being a successful batsman for his national team, he was never selected to play for the West Indies, perhaps because of inter-island prejudice, or simply because he lived on a small island that did not play first-class cricket at the time. In 1948 he played two matches for a Combined Leeward and Windward Islands team against British Guiana in Georgetown, top-scoring in each innings with 111, 82 and 38.

He began his working life in 1922 as a messenger with the post office, and worked his way up to become Antigua's postmaster in 1947. He was knighted in 2004 for services to Antigua. In 2006 the road that runs from the largest city, St John's, to Sir Vivian Richards Stadium was renamed the "Sir Sydney Walling Highway".

Walling died at the age of 102 in Antigua on 8 October 2009. Prime Minister Baldwin Spencer paid tribute to Walling after his death.
