= Liat Air =

Airline in Antigua and Barbuda

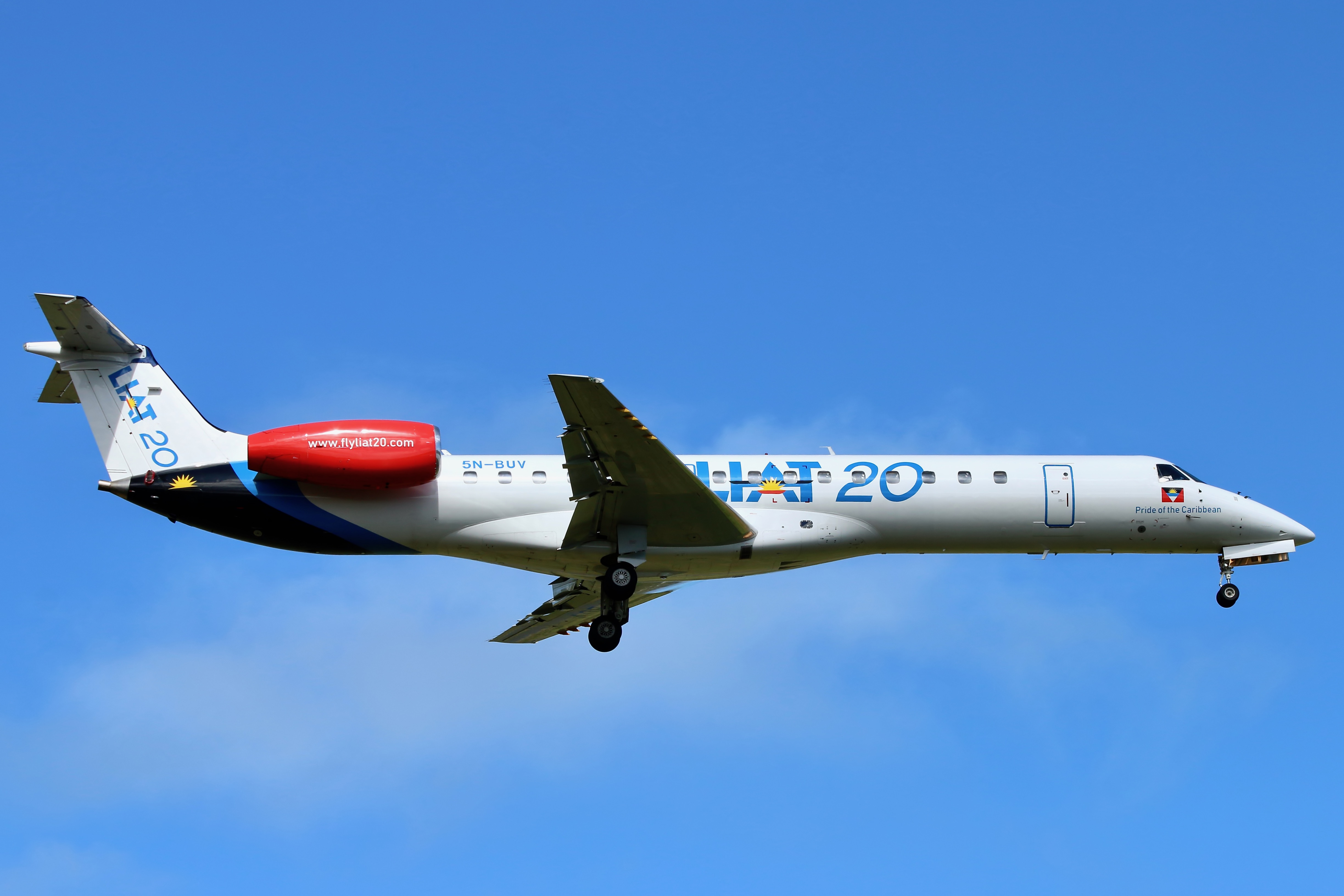
- A Embraer ERJ-145MP in former livery
IATA	ICAO	Call sign
5L	GAO	SOAR
- Founded: 24 July 2020 (replaced LIAT)
- Commenced operations: 6 August 2024
- Hubs: VC Bird International Airport; Argyle International Airport
- Frequent-flyer program: Liat Air Club
- Fleet size: 5
- Destinations: 11
- Parent company: Air Peace (70%); Government of Antigua and Barbuda (30%)
- Headquarters: Osbourn, Antigua and Barbuda
- Key people: Hafsah Abdulsalam (CEO)
- Website: flyliatair.com

Liat Air (/liːæt/; Antiguan and Barbudan Creole pronunciation [liːäːt]) is an airline of Antigua and Barbuda. The company was preceded by LIAT (1974), and commenced operations on 6 August 2024. Liat Air is a 30/70 venture between the Government of Antigua and Barbuda and Air Peace, and its fleet has been inherited from LIAT (1974) and the latter.

== History ==
The effects of the COVID-19 pandemic led to the liquidation of LIAT (1974) after many unsuccessful years. The company officially ceased operations on January 24, 2024 and laid off more than 90 employees.

LIAT20 was incorporated in Antigua and Barbuda in July 2020, in collaboration with private Nigerian airline Air Peace. Air Peace holds a 70% stake in the company and has been responsible for the leasing of the new Embraer E145s that are being used for the initial routes of the airline. Air Peace and the Government of Antigua and Barbuda invested USD$65 million and USD $20 million respectively.

The airline received the first two of the new Embraer ERJ 145 regional jets in April 2024 and announced that flights would start within weeks. At the time, inter-island connections were prioritized with the Government looking to revise previous routes of LIAT (1974) such as those to Puerto Rico and the U.S. Virgin Islands. It was also announced that a larger Embraer E195-E2 jet would be acquired in the future. The airline also operates the ATR 42-600 turboprop aircraft.

The airline commenced operations on August 6, 2024, with the inaugural flight to Castries, Saint Lucia. It was announced that scheduled service would begin 2 weeks later, on August 19, 2024, on a twice-daily, thrice weekly Antigua-Saint Lucia-Barbados routing.

On 12 July 2025 the airline rebranded to Liat Air.

== Destinations ==
As of 28 December 2025:

Country	City	Airport	Notes	Refs
Antigua and Barbuda	Osbourn	V. C. Bird International Airport	Hub	
Antigua and Barbuda	Codrington	Burton–Nibbs International Airport		
Barbados	Bridgetown	Grantley Adams International Airport		
British Virgin Islands	Tortola	Terrance B. Lettsome International Airport		
Dominica	Marigot	Douglas–Charles Airport		
Dominican Republic	Punta Cana	Punta Cana International Airport		
Dominican Republic	Santo Domingo	Las Américas International Airport		
Grenada	St. George's	Maurice Bishop International Airport		
Guyana	Georgetown	Cheddi Jagan International Airport		
Jamaica	Kingston	Norman Manley International Airport		
Jamaica	Montego Bay	Sangster International Airport		
Saint Kitts and Nevis	Basseterre	Robert L. Bradshaw International Airport		
Saint Lucia	Castries	George F. L. Charles Airport		
Saint Vincent	Kingstown	Argyle International Airport	Hub	
Sint Maarten	Philipsburg	Princess Juliana International Airport		
Trinidad and Tobago	Port of Spain	Piarco International Airport		

== Fleet ==
As of December 2024, the LIAT20 fleet consists of the following aircraft:

LIAT20 Fleet
Aircraft	In fleet	Orders	Passengers	Notes
ATR 42-600	2		48	Ex-LIAT (1974) aircraft
Embraer E145	3	—	50	Leased from Air Peace All parked
Embraer E195-E2	—	1	124	Leased from Air Peace
Total	5			
