= Piggotts =

- Old Parham Road in Piggotts, 2023
- Interactive map of the Piggotts main place
- Location within Antigua and Barbuda
- Coordinates: 17°7′31.48″N 61°48′12.71″W
- Country: Antigua and Barbuda
- Island: Antigua
- Parish: Saint George
- Founded: June 14, 1861; 165 years ago
- Elevation: 55 m (180 ft)

Population (2011)
  - Total: 1,931
- Time zone: UTC-4

Piggotts, also known as St. Mark's Village, is a village in Saint George Parish on Antigua island in Antigua and Barbuda. It had a population of 1,478 in 2001.

It is located in the north of the island, to the east of the capital city of St. John's.

== History ==
In the late 1850s and early 1860s a school was built in what is now Piggotts to provide education to the poorer residents of the nearby sugar estates of Carlisle, Fitches Creek, Weirs, Gunthorpes, Paynters and Cassada Gardens. This school was centrally located so all of the residents of the estates would have easy access to the school.

Circa 1864, Richard Albert Louden Piggott (1844-1926) from Newgate Street in St. John’s City, moved to this area. Piggott had so many children, that the area eventually became known as “Piggotts Village”.

=== Rivalry with Osbourn ===
The village had a rivalry with Osbourn Farm, especially in cricket. The two villages were separated by a gap, but when the affordable housing project Happy Hill was constructed from the 1950s to the 1970s, the villages became connected, and the rivalry slowly ended.

== Geography ==
The town is landlocked and has no sea access, and borders the town of Osbourn.

== Religion ==
The town is home to the Antigua & Barduda International Islamic Society Masjid, one of the only mosques in Antigua and Barbuda, as well as

- Praise Tabernacle United Pentecostal Church
- New Life Assembly of God
- Church of God 7th Day
- Clare Hall Christian Union Church.

Religion Data
Q49 Religion	Counts	%
Adventist	188	9.78%
Anglican	462	24.10%
Baptist	38	2.00%
Church of God	93	4.85%
Evangelical	63	3.27%
Jehovah Witness	50	2.60%
Methodist	59	3.09%
Moravian	170	8.84%
Nazarene	30	1.55%
None/no religion	73	3.83%
Pentecostal	271	14.14%
Rastafarian	13	0.66%
Roman Catholic	185	9.67%
Weslyan Holiness	29	1.50%
Other	91	4.74%
Don't know/Not stated	103	5.39%
Total	1 918	100.00%
NotApp :	13	

== Demographics ==
Piggots has five enumeration districts.

- 40600 Piggotts-School
- 40700 Pigotts Hill
- 40800 Piggotts-St.Mary's
- 40900 Piggotts-Moravian
- 41000 Piggotts-Central

=== Census data ===
Q48 Ethnic	Counts	%
African descendent	1,741	90.16%
Caucasian/White	11	0.57%
East Indian/India	34	1.76%
Mixed (Black/White)	5	0.28%
Mixed (Other)	58	3.00%
Hispanic	54	2.82%
Syrian/Lebanese	11	0.57%
Other	6	0.34%
Don't know/Not stated	10	0.51%
Total	1,931	100.00%

Q58. Country of birth	Counts	%
Africa	7	0.34%
Antigua and Barbuda	1,353	70.06%
Other Caribbean countries	15	0.78%
Canada	4	0.23%
Other Asian countries	15	0.80%
Other European countries	4	0.23%
Dominica	78	4.03%
Dominican Republic	45	2.31%
Guyana	110	5.72%
Jamaica	89	4.61%
Monsterrat	10	0.50%
St. Kitts and Nevis	9	0.44%
St. Lucia	68	3.52%
St. Vincent and the Grenadines	26	1.32%
Syria	6	0.29%
Trinidad and Tobago	12	0.61%
United Kingdom	8	0.40%
USA	46	2.36%
USVI United States Virgin Islands	6	0.33%
Not Stated	22	1.12%
Total	1,931	100.00%

Q71 Country of Citizenship 1	Counts	%
Antigua and Barbuda	1,592	82.46%
Other Caribbean countries	9	0.45%
Canada	9	0.46%
Other Asian and Middle Eastern countries	7	0.34%
Dominica	29	1.49%
Dominican Republic	27	1.37%
Guyana	71	3.66%
Jamaica	63	3.28%
Monsterrat	5	0.28%
St. Lucia	30	1.54%
St. Vincent and the Grenadines	12	0.61%
Trinidad and Tobago	8	0.39%
United Kingdom	7	0.34%
USA	45	2.32%
Other countries	2	0.11%
Not Stated	17	0.89%
Total	1,931	100.00%

Q71 Country of Citizenship 2 (Country of Second Citizenship)	Counts	%
Other Caribbean countries	14	4.88%
Canada	1	0.39%
Other Asian and Middle Eastern countries	10	3.49%
Dominica	54	19.11%
Dominican Republic	17	6.00%
Guyana	44	15.44%
Jamaica	27	9.41%
Monsterrat	5	1.89%
St. Lucia	39	13.79%
St. Vincent and the Grenadines	13	4.51%
Trinidad and Tobago	4	1.49%
United Kingdom	4	1.49%
USA	48	16.95%
Other countries	3	1.15%
Total	285	100.00%
NotApp :	1,646	

== See also ==
- Sir Vivian Richards Stadium — located near Piggotts.
- Category:Antigua
