= St. George's Anglican Church, Antigua =

Church in Antigua and Barbuda

St. George Parish Church is currently located at Fitches Creek and is one of the oldest churches in Antigua. It was designated parish church in 1725.

The church was built in 1687.
