= Cedar Valley, Antigua and Barbuda =

Coordinates: 17°8′42.86″N 61°49′19.85″W

Cedar Valley
- Village
- Interactive map of the Cedar Valley main place
- Location within Antigua and Barbuda
- Country: Antigua and Barbuda
- Island: Antigua
- Parish: Saint John

Population (2011)
  - Total: 616
- Time zone: UTC-4 (AST)

Cedar Valley is a settlement in Saint John Parish, Antigua and Barbuda.

The town has a golf course and is home to the Cedar Valley Golf Club.

== History ==
=== Cedar Valley Plantation ===
Three DuBuissons (James Memoth DuBuisson, Mrs. Edith Manus Dubuisson, and William Herman DuBuisson), as well as Alexander Moody-Stuart and Judith Gwendolyn Moody-Stuart, received 18,000 shares in the Antigua Sugar Estates for £1 each in 1940. George Moody-Stuart was offered shares but turned them down, denoting the final generational transition. Together with Cedar Valley, the following estates would be under the authority of the new corporation: Gunthorpe's (#64), Cassada Garden (#13), Paynter's (#61), Tomlinson's (#17), Fitches Creek (#67), Donovan's (#65), North Sound (#66), Galley Bay (#30), and Five Islands (#31).

The Lands of Antigua & Barbuda Sugar Factory Limited and the Antigua & Barbuda Syndicate Estates Limited (Vesting) Act were passed by the Antiguan government the same year, and they stated that "all piece or parcel of land forming part of Cedar Valley, approximately 240.225 acres as contained in Certificate of Title No. 1111940 dated 26th April, 1940 and registered in Register Book P Folio 11" fell under their purview.

According to a Certificate of Title with the number 1111940 issued April 26, 1940, the Cedar Valley's lands totaled 240.2 acres. Folio 11 of Register Book P. Gunthorpes Estates, Ltd., was reorganized on August 1 into a new business and given the name Antigua Syndicate Estates, Ltd. (see Gunthorpes (#64)). Cassada Garden, Cedar Valley, Fitches Creek, and North Sound, the original company's holdings, were purchased for £30,700, and Delaps (#137) was acquired for £7,734.

== Demographics ==
Cedar Valley has 2 enumeration districts.

- 31701 Cedar Valley-Longford
- 31702 Cedar Valley

=== Census data ===
Q48 Ethnic	Counts	%
African descendent	457	74.19%
Caucasian/White	29	4.66%
East Indian/India	28	4.48%
Mixed (Black/White)	28	4.48%
Mixed (Other)	33	5.38%
Hispanic	8	1.25%
Syrian/Lebanese	29	4.66%
Other	3	0.54%
Don't know/Not stated	2	0.36%
Total	616	100.00%

Q49 Religion	Counts	%
Adventist	77	12.66%
Anglican	134	21.88%
Baptist	14	2.35%
Church of God	8	1.27%
Jehovah Witness	4	0.72%
Methodist	39	6.33%
Moravian	45	7.41%
Nazarene	2	0.36%
None/no religion	24	3.98%
Pentecostal	50	8.14%
Rastafarian	1	0.18%
Roman Catholic	99	16.27%
Weslyan Holiness	8	1.27%
Other	39	6.33%
Don't know/Not stated	66	10.85%
Total	611	100.00%
NotApp :	6	

Q53 Insurance	Counts	%
Yes	469	76.16%
No	136	22.04%
Don't know/Not stated	11	1.79%
Total	616	100.00%

Q55 Internet Use	Counts	%
Yes	504	81.72%
No	109	17.74%
Don't know/Not stated	3	0.54%
Total	616	100.00%

Q58. Country of birth	Counts	%
Africa	9	1.43%
Other Latin or North American countries	10	1.61%
Antigua and Barbuda	384	62.37%
Other Caribbean countries	12	1.97%
Canada	10	1.61%
Other Asian countries	14	2.33%
Other European countries	3	0.54%
Dominica	12	1.97%
Dominican Republic	4	0.72%
Guyana	29	4.66%
Jamaica	18	2.87%
Monsterrat	11	1.79%
St. Kitts and Nevis	8	1.25%
St. Lucia	4	0.72%
St. Vincent and the Grenadines	3	0.54%
Syria	12	1.97%
Trinidad and Tobago	12	1.97%
United Kingdom	25	4.12%
USA	25	4.12%
USVI United States Virgin Islands	1	0.18%
Not Stated	8	1.25%
Total	616	100.00%

Q71 Country of Citizenship 1	Counts	%
Antigua and Barbuda	510	82.80%
Other Caribbean countries	7	1.08%
Canada	3	0.54%
Other Asian and Middle Eastern countries	9	1.43%
Guyana	13	2.15%
Jamaica	11	1.79%
Monsterrat	3	0.54%
St. Lucia	1	0.18%
St. Vincent and the Grenadines	1	0.18%
Trinidad and Tobago	3	0.54%
United Kingdom	13	2.15%
USA	22	3.58%
Other countries	14	2.33%
Not Stated	4	0.72%
Total	616	100.00%

Q71 Country of Citizenship 2 (Country of Second Citizenship)	Counts	%
Other Caribbean countries	12	6.75%
Canada	17	9.20%
Other Asian and Middle Eastern countries	23	12.88%
Dominica	15	8.59%
Dominican Republic	3	1.84%
Guyana	11	6.13%
Jamaica	6	3.07%
Monsterrat	3	1.84%
St. Lucia	3	1.84%
St. Vincent and the Grenadines	2	1.23%
Trinidad and Tobago	9	4.91%
United Kingdom	23	12.88%
USA	35	19.63%
Other countries	17	9.20%
Total	180	100.00%
NotApp :	436	

Q91 Business Earning	Counts	%
Under $1,000 EC per month	6	15.15%
1,000 to $1,999 EC per month	3	9.09%
2,000 to $2,999 EC per month	11	30.30%
3,000 to $4,999 EC per month	8	21.21%
$5,000 EC and over per month	9	24.24%
Total	36	100.00%
NotApp :	568	
Missing :	12	

Employment status	Counts	%
Employed	314	63.82%
Unemployed	23	4.72%
Inactive	148	30.11%
Not stated	7	1.35%
Total	491	100.00%
NotApp :	125	
