= St. Johnston, St. John's =

Coordinates: 17°7′9.63″N 61°48′58.99″W

Saint Johnston Saint Johnson's Village
- Village
- Map of St. Johnston in Saint John

- Location within Antigua and Barbuda
- Country: Antigua and Barbuda
- Island: Antigua
- Civil parish: Saint John Parish

Government
  - Type: Village Council (possibly dissolved)

Population (2011)
  - Total: 515
- Time zone: UTC-4 (AST)

St. Johnston (or St. Johnston Village) is a settlement in the northwest of the island of Antigua. It lies to the east of the capital, St. John's, of which is virtually a suburb. Potters Village lies immediately to the southeast. It was named for the Governor General of the Leeward Islands, Sir Thomas Reginald St. Johnston who built a hospital there.

== Demographics ==
=== Enumeration districts ===
St. Johnston has two enumeration districts. It is considered a part of St. John's City.

- 15700 St. Johnsons Village
- 15800 St. Johnsons East

=== Census data (2011) ===
Ethnic
| Q48 Ethnic | Counts | % |
|---|---|---|
| African descendent | 392 | 76.07% |
| East Indian/India | 12 | 2.25% |
| Mixed (Other) | 1 | 0.20% |
| Hispanic | 106 | 20.65% |
| Other | 1 | 0.20% |
| Don't know/Not stated | 3 | 0.61% |
| Total | 515 | 100.00% |

Religion
| Q49 Religion | Counts | % |
|---|---|---|
| Adventist | 52 | 10.02% |
| Anglican | 80 | 15.54% |
| Baptist | 19 | 3.68% |
| Church of God | 28 | 5.52% |
| Evangelical | 3 | 0.61% |
| Jehovah Witness | 3 | 0.61% |
| Methodist | 13 | 2.45% |
| Moravian | 15 | 2.86% |
| Nazarene | 16 | 3.07% |
| None/no religion | 52 | 10.02% |
| Pentecostal | 104 | 20.25% |
| Rastafarian | 7 | 1.43% |
| Roman Catholic | 44 | 8.59% |
| Wesleyan Holiness | 3 | 0.61% |
| Other | 55 | 10.63% |
| Don't know/Not stated | 21 | 4.09% |
| Total | 515 | 100.00% |

Country of birth
| Q58. Country of birth | Counts | % |
|---|---|---|
| Africa | 1 | 0.20% |
| Other Latin or North American countries | 1 | 0.20% |
| Antigua and Barbuda | 253 | 49.08% |
| Other Caribbean countries | 2 | 0.41% |
| Dominica | 20 | 3.89% |
| Dominican Republic | 96 | 18.61% |
| Guyana | 84 | 16.36% |
| Jamaica | 21 | 4.09% |
| Monsterrat | 4 | 0.82% |
| St. Kitts and Nevis | 1 | 0.20% |
| St. Lucia | 14 | 2.66% |
| St. Vincent and the Grenadines | 4 | 0.82% |
| Trinidad and Tobago | 1 | 0.20% |
| USA | 11 | 2.04% |
| USVI United States Virgin Islands | 1 | 0.20% |
| Not Stated | 1 | 0.20% |
| Total | 515 | 100.00% |

Lived Overseas
| Q61 Lived Overseas | Counts | % |
|---|---|---|
| Yes | 35 | 13.75% |
| No | 216 | 85.42% |
| Don't know/Not stated | 2 | 0.83% |
| Total | 253 | 100.00% |
| NotApp : | 262 | |

Country Last Lived
| Q62 Country Last Lived | Counts | % |
|---|---|---|
| Other Caribbean countries | 9 | 32.14% |
| Canada | 2 | 7.14% |
| United Kingdom | 5 | 17.86% |
| USA | 8 | 28.57% |
| USVI United States Virgin Islands | 4 | 14.29% |
| Total | 30 | 100.00% |
| NotApp : | 486 | |

Country of Citizenship
| Q71 Country of Citizenship 1 | Counts | % |
|---|---|---|
| Antigua and Barbuda | 359 | 69.73% |
| Other Caribbean countries | 2 | 0.41% |
| Dominica | 9 | 1.84% |
| Dominican Republic | 55 | 10.63% |
| Guyana | 53 | 10.22% |
| Jamaica | 15 | 2.86% |
| Monsterrat | 2 | 0.41% |
| St. Lucia | 8 | 1.64% |
| St. Vincent and the Grenadines | 4 | 0.82% |
| USA | 5 | 1.02% |
| Other countries | 2 | 0.41% |
| Total | 515 | 100.00% |

Country of Second Citizenship
| Q71 Country of Citizenship 2 | Counts | % |
|---|---|---|
| Other Caribbean countries | 2 | 1.90% |
| Canada | 1 | 0.95% |
| Dominica | 8 | 7.62% |
| Dominican Republic | 42 | 38.10% |
| Guyana | 33 | 29.52% |
| Jamaica | 6 | 5.71% |
| Monsterrat | 2 | 1.90% |
| St. Lucia | 6 | 5.71% |
| Trinidad and Tobago | 1 | 0.95% |
| United Kingdom | 1 | 0.95% |
| USA | 7 | 6.67% |
| Total | 111 | 100.00% |
| NotApp : | 405 | |

== Sources ==
- Miller, D. (ed.) (2005) Caribbean Islands. (4th edition). Footscray, VIC: Lonely Planet.
- Scott, C. R. (ed.) (2005) Insight guide: Caribbean (5th edition). London: Apa Publications.
