= Carib Aviation =

Airline of Antigua and Barbuda, 1972–2008

IATA	ICAO	Call sign
3Q	DEL	RED TAIL
- Founded: 1972
- Ceased operations: 2008
- Hubs: VC Bird International Airport
- Fleet size: 8
- Destinations: 14
- Parent company: Carib Aviation Limited
- Headquarters: Antigua
- Key people: Bruce Kaufman (CEO)
- Website: http://www.carib-aviation.com

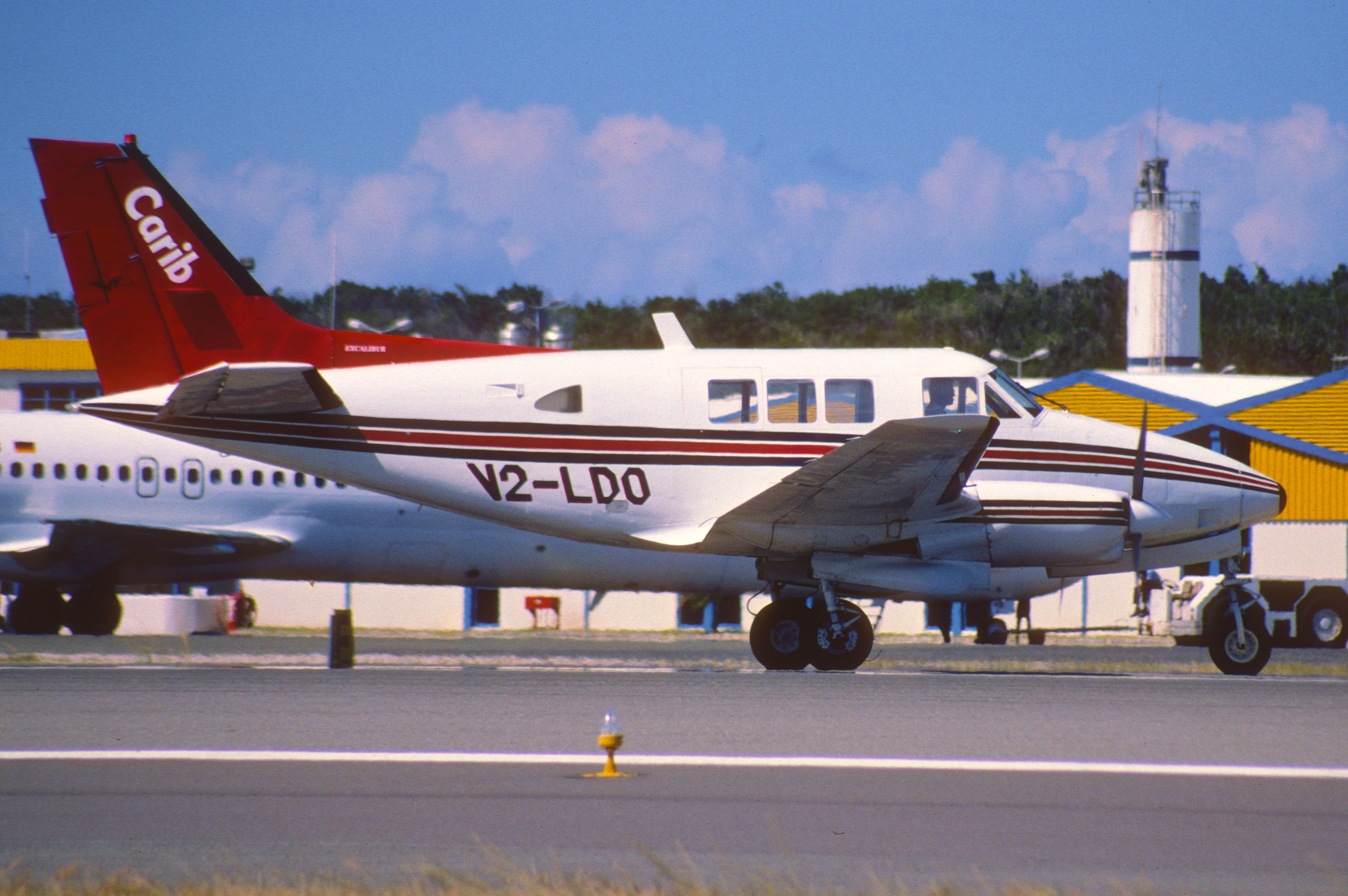
Pictured is the Carib Aviation Beech Excalibur Queenaire 8800

Carib Aviation was an airline based in Antigua and Barbuda.

== History ==
Founded in 1972 by (Sir) Frank Delisle with a single twin-prop aircraft, Carib Aviation provided charter and scheduled flights throughout the Caribbean from its main base in Antigua. At its peak the company employed 63 personnel, including some 15 pilots and 22 engineering staff. The office facilities were at VC Bird International Airport, accommodating administration, accounts, operations and traffic departments. An additional terminal office facility was located at Robert L. Bradshaw International Airport in Saint Kitts and Nevis. Carib Aviation also operated the DOMINICA AIR TAXI service between Antigua, Saint Lucia and Canefield Airport as well as a local feeder for LIAT.

On Tuesday 30 September 2008, Bruce Kaufman, new owner and CEO of the airline, announced that he was forced to cancel all flights the very same day because of no flight crews available. He accused LIAT of hiring seven of his Twin Otter pilots within a few days, breaking an agreement between the two airlines signed earlier in 2008 and leaving him with no choice but to stop all operations.

== Destinations ==
- Anguilla
  - The Valley (Anguilla Wallblake Airport)
- Antigua
  - St. John's (VC Bird International Airport)
- Barbuda
  - Codrington (Codrington Airport)
- Dominica
  - Marigot (Melville Hall Airport)
  - Roseau (Canefield Airport)
- Guadalupe
  - Pointe-à-Pitre (Pointe-à-Pitre International Airport)
- Martinique
  - Fort-de-France (Martinique Aimé Césaire International Airport)
- Montserrat
  - Brades (Gerald's Airport)
- Nevis
  - Charlestown (Vance W. Amory International Airport)
- St. Kitts
  - Basseterre (Robert L. Bradshaw International Airport)
- St. Lucia
  - Castries (George F. L. Charles Airport)
  - Vieux Fort Quarter (Hewanorra International Airport)
- St. Vincent
  - Kingstown (E.T. Joshua Airport)
- Tortola
  - Beef Island (Terrance B. Lettsome International Airport)

== Fleet ==
As of September 2008 the Carib Aviation fleet included :

- 1 Beech 65 QueenAir Excalibur
- 1 Britten Norman Islander
