= Cassada Gardens =

- Village
- Location within Antigua
- Coordinates: 17°08′10″N 61°48′53″W
- Country: Antigua and Barbuda
- Parish: Saint John

Cassada Gardens is a village in Saint John, Antigua and Barbuda geographically located within the larger Skyline community. The village was named after a sugar estate, which in turn was derived from the term "cassava", a plant that produces large green leaves and a tuber that has long been a source of food for Indigenous peoples of the Americas.

In 1651, major general Sydnam Poyntz was appointed as governor of Antigua by Charles II. During his time as governor, he established the Cassada Gardens estate. The estate changed ownership several times following his departure. In 1747 the estate was inherited by Abraham Redwood of Newport, Rhode Island. When slavery was abolished in 1833, about 3,000 pounds were awarded to various planters for freeing 197 slaves, with an additional 600 pounds being granted for freeing an additional thirty-three. This plantation continued following the abolition of slavery, notably by the Shand family which acquired it in 1872. At one point the family was one of the largest landowners on the island. During World War II, the village was a transit point for commuters to the Antigua Air Station. Many visitors would steal sugar cane until police eventually began to "jump" offenders. By 1945 the village became known for its horse stables, a horse racing track continues to exist in the village.

In 1856, 82 people lived on the estate. Demographic data for the village has not been released in any other census since. The village is mentioned in national legislation however. The village is home to the national government's transportation and civil aviation offices. The nearest major highway is Sir George Walter Highway.
