= Cedar Grove, Antigua and Barbuda =

Cedar Grove
- Village
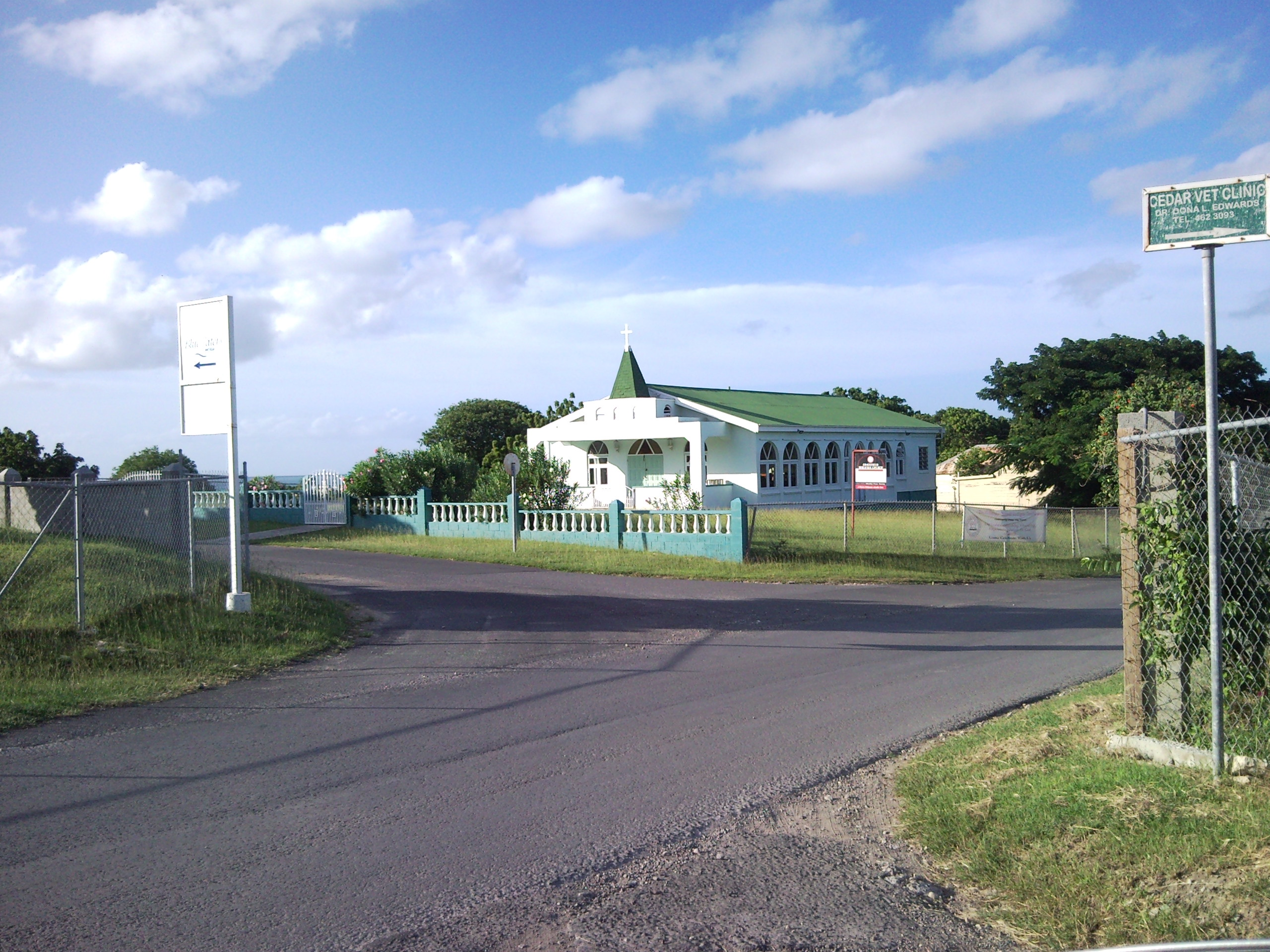
- Cedar Grove Main Road
- Interactive map of the Cedar Grove main place
- Location within Antigua and Barbuda
- Coordinates: 17°9′44.53″N 61°49′4.01″W
- Country: Antigua and Barbuda
- Island: Antigua
- Elevation: 12 m (39 ft)

Population (2012)
  - Total: 934
- Time zone: UTC-4 (AST)

Cedar Grove is a settlement in the far north of the island of Antigua. It is located to the east of the island's northernmost headlands, Boon Point. It is 6 kilometres (3.7 mi) northeast of the capital, St. John's.

== History ==
The settlement was first mentioned in May 1841. Around the 1850s, the name of Cedar Grove was Willocks Village, although some American maps used this name until the 1940s.

== Demographics ==
Cedar Grove is classified as "lower medium income", however, it is still one of the best parts of the nation to live in, having a Living Conditions Index of 14.26.

There are three enumeration districts in Cedar Grove.

- 30300 Cedar Grove-East
- 30400 Cedar Grove-St. James
- 30500 Cedar Grove-South

Ethnic data
Q48 Ethnic	Counts	%
African descendent	873	93.50%
Caucasian/White	4	0.47%
East Indian/India	3	0.35%
Mixed (Other)	30	3.19%
Hispanic	20	2.13%
Other	1	0.12%
Don't know/Not stated	2	0.24%
Total	934	100.00%

Religion
Q49 Religion	Counts	%
Adventist	119	12.83%
Anglican	358	38.48%
Baptist	46	4.99%
Church of God	12	1.31%
Evangelical	11	1.19%
Jehovah Witness	6	0.59%
Methodist	6	0.59%
Moravian	149	16.03%
Nazarene	2	0.24%
None/no religion	43	4.63%
Pentecostal	27	2.85%
Rastafarian	9	0.95%
Roman Catholic	27	2.85%
Weslyan Holiness	81	8.67%
Other	20	2.14%
Don't know/Not stated	15	1.66%
Total	930	100.00%

Country of birth
Q58. Country of birth	Counts	%
Antigua and Barbuda	744	79.67%
Other Caribbean countries	7	0.71%
Canada	3	0.35%
Dominica	21	2.25%
Dominican Republic	17	1.77%
Guyana	23	2.48%
Jamaica	44	4.73%
Monsterrat	2	0.24%
St. Kitts and Nevis	1	0.12%
St. Lucia	7	0.71%
St. Vincent and the Grenadines	2	0.24%
Trinidad and Tobago	3	0.35%
United Kingdom	7	0.71%
USA	35	3.78%
USVI United States Virgin Islands	7	0.71%
Not Stated	11	1.18%
Total	934	100.00%

Country of citizenship
Q71 Country of Citizenship 1	Counts	%
Antigua and Barbuda	805	86.17%
Other Caribbean countries	7	0.71%
Canada	1	0.12%
Dominica	9	0.95%
Dominican Republic	14	1.54%
Guyana	20	2.13%
Jamaica	35	3.78%
Monsterrat	2	0.24%
St. Lucia	4	0.47%
St. Vincent and the Grenadines	1	0.12%
United Kingdom	4	0.47%
USA	23	2.48%
Not Stated	8	0.83%
Total	934	100.00%

Country of second citizenship
Q71 Country of Citizenship 2	Counts	%
Other Caribbean countries	6	6.76%
Canada	2	2.70%
Dominica	12	14.86%
Dominican Republic	4	5.41%
Guyana	8	9.46%
Jamaica	9	10.81%
St. Lucia	6	6.76%
St. Vincent and the Grenadines	1	1.35%
Trinidad and Tobago	3	4.05%
United Kingdom	4	5.41%
USA	24	29.73%
Other countries	1	1.35%
Not Stated	1	1.35%
Total	82	100.00%
NotApp :	852	
