= Saint George, Antigua and Barbuda =

Coordinates: 17°07′N 61°48′W

Parish of Saint George
- Parish
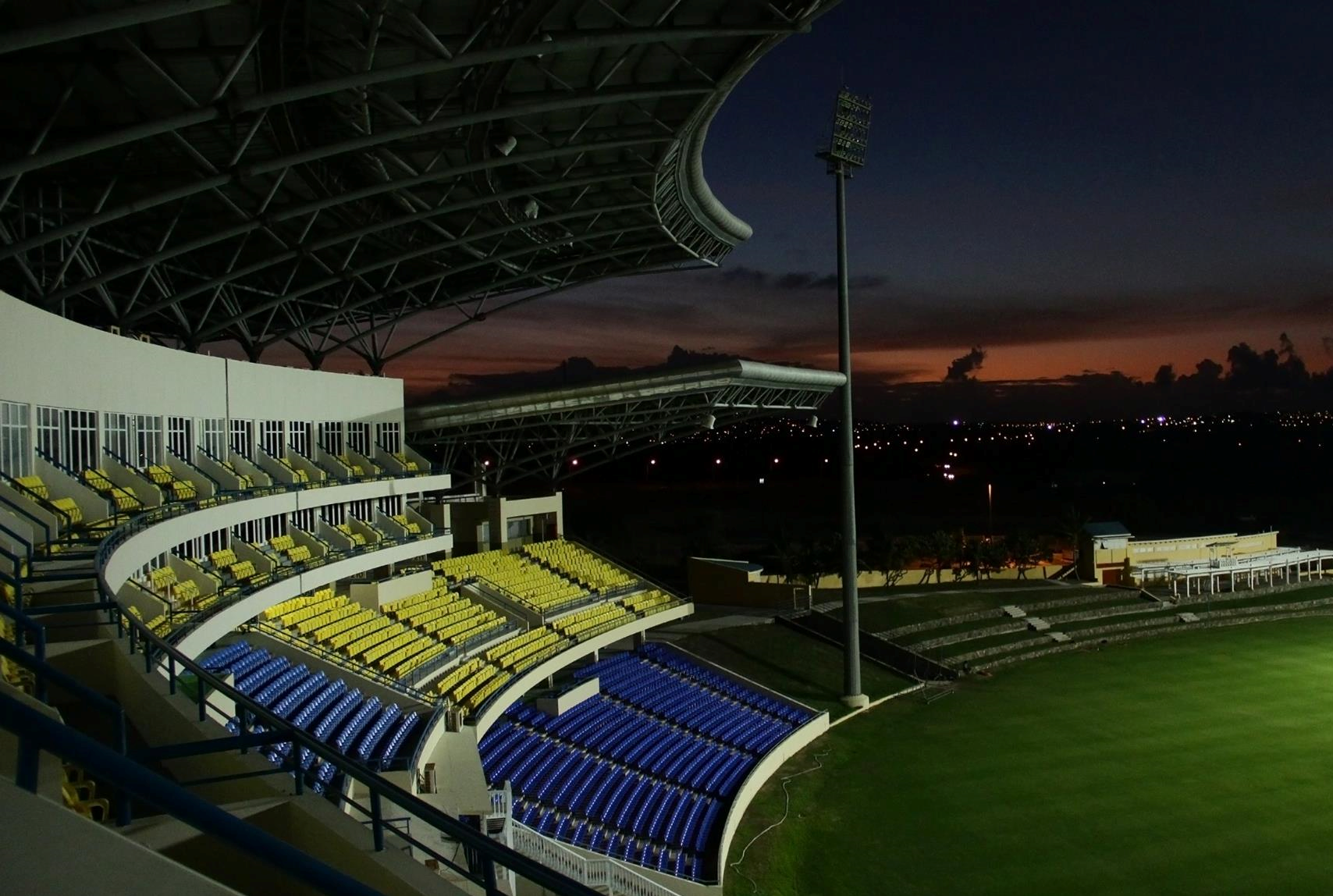
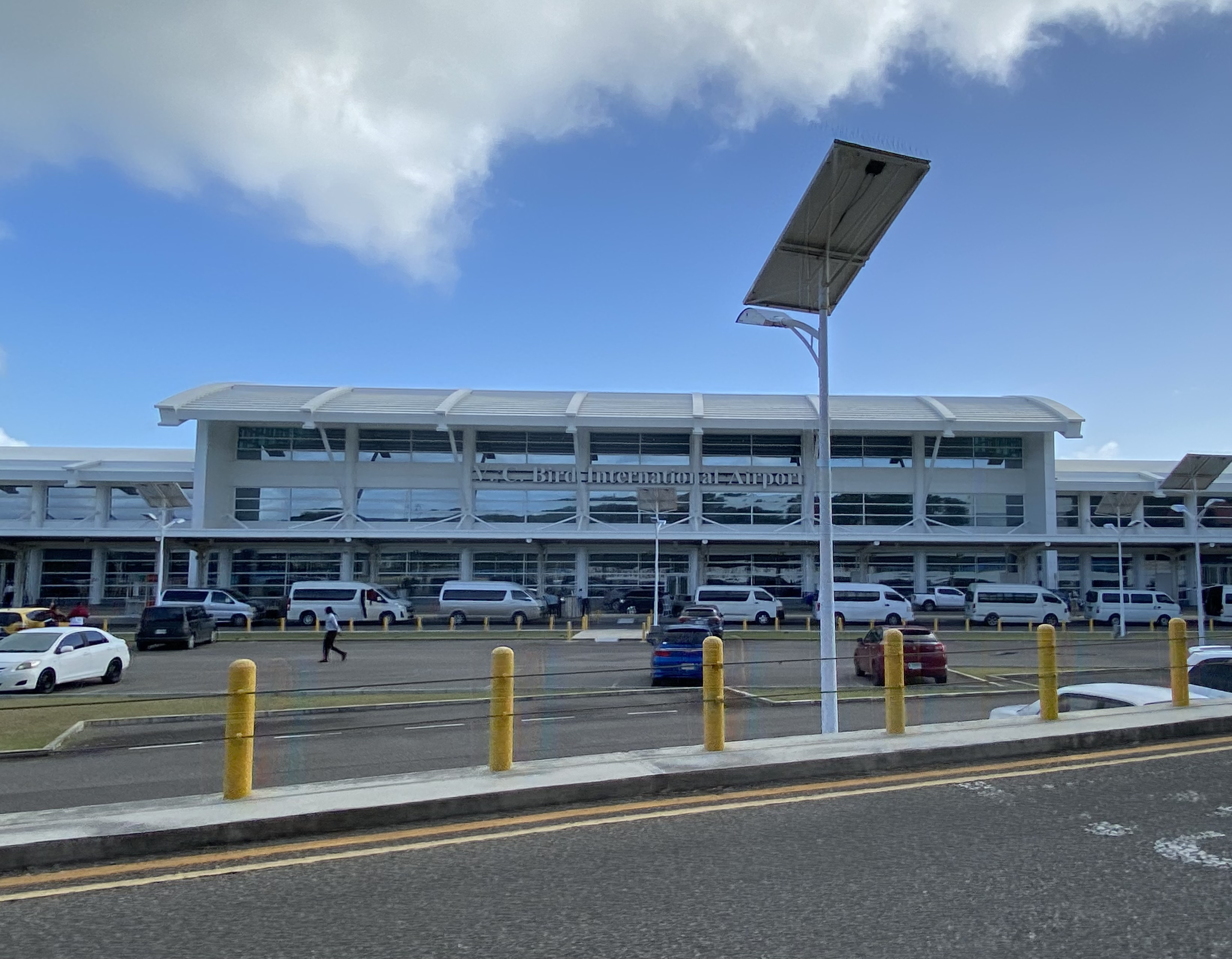
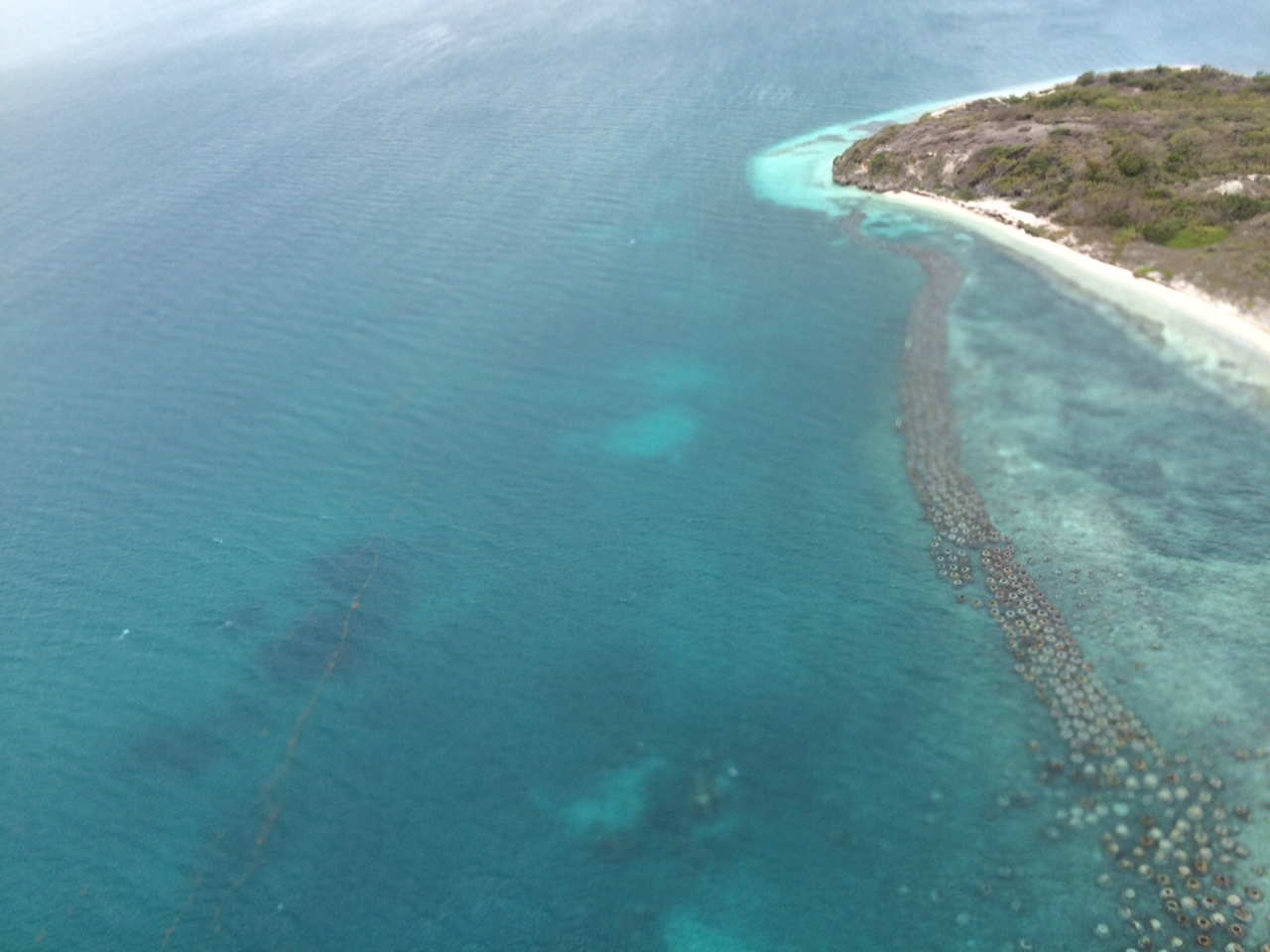
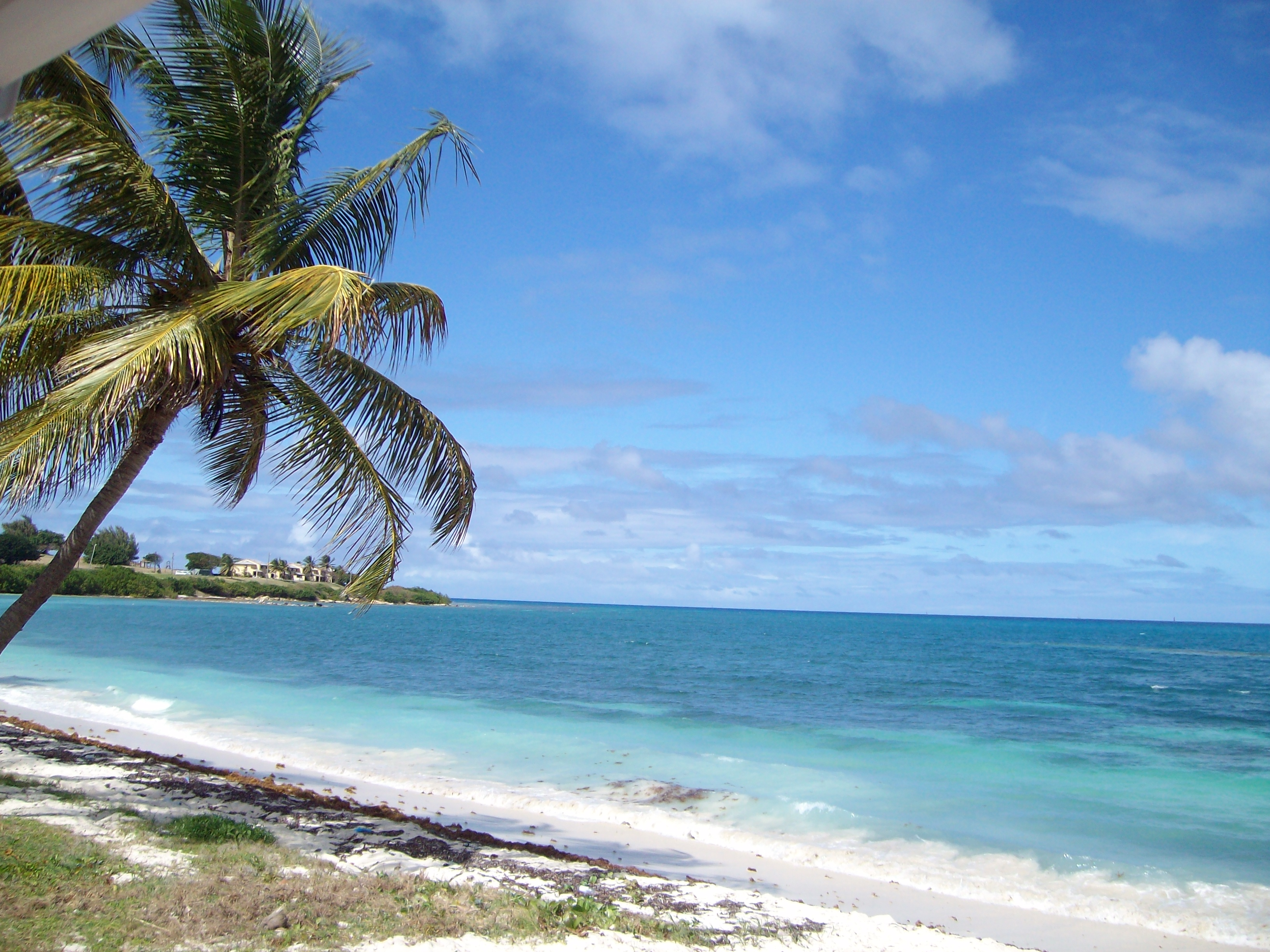
- (from top: left to right) Sir Vivian Richards Stadium, V.C. Bird International Airport, Reef Balls on Maiden Island, Dutchman Bay

- Country: Antigua and Barbuda
- Pre-establishment entity: Division of New North Sound
- Establishment: 22 January 1725; 301 years ago (old style); 5 February 1725; 301 years ago (new style)
- Capital: Fitches Creek
- Largest city: Piggotts

Government
  - MPs: Michael Freeland, Rawdon Turner, Charles Fernandez

Population
  - 2018 estimate: 8,817
  - Density: 329.99/km^{2} (854.7/sq mi)
- HDI (2023): ▲0.860 very high · 1st
- Time zone: UTC-4 (AST)

Saint George (Antiguan and Barbudan Creole: Sen Jaaj), officially the Parish of Saint George, is a parish of Antigua and Barbuda on the island of Antigua. Saint George borders Saint Peter to the southeast, and Saint John to the west and south. Saint George is mostly farmland and savanna in the south, dense forest in the Blackman's Peninsula area, marshland in the Fitches Creek area, and dense forest in the northwest. It is the smallest parish in Antigua and Barbuda, and the parish capital is Fitches Creek. The largest city in the parish is Piggotts. Saint George is the newest parish, splitting from the parish of Saint Peter in 1725. It had an estimated population of 8,817 in 2018.

Saint George is the most prosperous parish in the country, with the communities of Fitches Creek and Coolidge being classified as one of the six neighbourhoods in the country to have high-income status in 2008. The neighbourhoods of Fitches Creek, Coolidge, Airport all had the top fifteen living conditions indexes in 2008. Saint George's prosperity has been the result of having one of the most modern airports in the Caribbean, V. C. Bird International Airport, the headquarters of the Antigua and Barbuda Defence Force, Camp Blizzard, multiple universities such as the American University of Antigua and the Antigua and Barbuda International Institute of Technology, the Sir Vivian Richards Stadium, and the former Antigua Air Station. This economic prosperity is spread throughout the parish, with both the northern region of the parish, and the southern region, having important and modern facilities.

Long Island and Maiden Island are legally parts of the parish of Saint George, however, statistically, the three residents on Long Island in 2011 were counted as living in Saint Peter, and politically, Long Island and Maiden Island are sometimes considered parts of the St. Peter constituency.

Saint George does not have many tourist attractions and beaches, and instead generates much of its revenue from the V.C. Bird International Airport, the only airport in Antigua, and the 20,000-capacity Sir Vivian Richards Cricket Stadium, which co-hosted the 2007 Cricket World Cup. Due to the many international universities hosted in Saint George, Saint George has a large international student population. Due to Saint George hosting Antigua's only airport, Saint George also hosts the main air-links into Barbuda and Montserrat.

The Division of New North Sound, which is now the only division in Saint George, split from Saint Peter with the primary objective of providing for their parish church and having their own parish vestry. Historically, the majority of the parish's lands were used for agricultural purposes. Numerous historical relics from the parish can still be seen today, including the Blackman's and Judge Blizzard's plantations.

== History ==
=== Archaic age and ceramic age in Winthrope's Bay ===
From the earliest days of colonization, pre-Columbian peoples made extensive use of Winthorpe's Bay. There are patches of Archaic Age flakes and lithic debitage scattered over many kilometers of the waterfront, together with deposits of shellfish, which are the leftovers of prehistoric meals. In 1997, a shoreline archaeological survey was carried out. Three sites from the Ceramic Age were identified and examined during this search. One meter below the surface, Saladoid pottery was found in GE-06 (Winthorpe's West). But the site is essentially a post-Saladoid site. The second and biggest site is GE-01, a sizable post-Saladoid and Archaic munti-component site (Winthorpe's East). Here was found a lithic workshop, or flint processing facility. There were two archeological excavations in 1997 and 2002. Barnacle Point, and the Archaic sites, GE-9 and 10, were destroyed by land development in the summer of 2003. Studies in this field are ongoing.

=== Colonial period ===
The parish of Saint George was created on 22 January 1725 after An Act for dividing the Parish of Saint Peter in the said Island; and for erecting a new Parish, to be called the Parish of Saint George passed the Assembly on 10 January 1725, and the Council on the same day. The parish was created due to the parish of Saint Peter being too large to support the parish of Saint George. The parish was governed by twelve vestry-men.

During the times of slavery, Saint George was divided into twenty-two slave plantations.

=== World War II and U.S. interest ===
The United States sought to establish an Army Air Base at Coolidge, Saint George, and a Naval Air Station at Crabbs, Saint Peter. The U.S. flag was hoisted on 21 March 1941, even though the Antigua agreement was not signed until 28 May and the entire lease agreement not until 27 March 1941. Even earlier, on 4 February, work had started building the Naval Air Station, and on 17 March, a detachment of fifty Marines, the first American military personnel, arrived. On 13 May, construction on the bigger Army Air Base started. The settlement of Winthorpes and the MacDonalds' estate house at High Point were included in the borders of the region selected for the Army base, which was primarily made up of canefield, scrub, and mango swamp.

Construction on the base did not conclude until the spring of 1942, in part due to the lengthy process of relocating the village and its residents. However, both bases had started up immediately using makeshift facilities, with the first plane landing at Coolidge on 6 June 1941, and the first seaplane arriving at Crabbs, Saint Peter on 25 June. When the air bases diminished in importance, the army air base was converted into the Coolidge Airport, later renamed the V.C. Bird International Airport.

== Geography ==
Communities in the parish

Saint George is mostly flat, being dominated by grasslands in the south, marshland in the centre, and forest in the north. Much of the sea floor surrounding the parish is home to seagrass patches. There are many creek systems in the southern region of the parish. There is a salt pond in the northern region, and various small water bodies in the south. In 1891, Saint George was very well connected by Antigua's historic rail infrastructure. The parish is mostly part of Antigua's limestone region. The northern region has a very right drought risk and the southern region has a low drought risk. All of the coastline is part of the Northeast Marine Management Area. The parish has some marine sand coverage, many coral reef communities, and many mangrove wetlands.

== Demographics ==
=== Ethnicity ===
Saint George is one of the most diverse parishes in the country. According to the 2011 census, nine ethnic groups were self-reported by parish residents. The ethnic groups chosen were African descendent (89.29 per cent), other mixed (5.15 per cent), mixed black/white (1.14 per cent), East Indian (1.01 per cent), Hispanic (0.97 per cent), white (0.97 per cent), other (0.68 per cent), dn/ns (0.42 per cent), and Syrian/Lebanese (0.37 per cent).

=== Immigration ===
According to the 2011 census, twenty-one country of birth groups were self-reported by parish residents. The country of birth groups chosen were born in Africa (0.19 per cent), other Latin or North American countries (0.17 per cent), Antigua and Barbuda (73.04 per cent), other Caribbean countries (1.22 per cent), Canada (0.50 per cent), other Asian countries (0.33 per cent), other European countries (0.20 per cent), Dominica (3.66 per cent), the Dominican Republic (0.96 per cent), Guyana (4.92 per cent), Jamaica (3.80 per cent), Montserrat (0.81 per cent), St. Kitts and Nevis (0.53 per cent), St. Lucia (1.54 per cent), St. Vincent and the Grenadines (0.74 per cent), Syria (0.04 per cent), Trinidad and Tobago (0.86 per cent), the United Kingdom (0.98 per cent), the United States (3.48 per cent), the United States Virgin Islands (0.53 per cent), and not stated (1.50 per cent).

=== Religion ===
According to the 2011 census, sixteen religious groups were self-reported by parish residents. The major religious groups chosen were Adventists (12.02 per cent), Anglicans (23.20 per cent), Moravian (11.26 per cent), Pentecostalism (9.65 per cent), irreligion (4.48 per cent), and Rastafari (0.55 per cent).

== Economy ==
=== Employment and workers ===
According to the 2011 census, there were 3,882 workers in the parish. 87.21 per cent of these workers had a fixed place of work outside of the home, 2.97 per cent worked from home, 7.03 per cent had no fixed place of work, and 2.78 per cent did not know or did not state. 19.60 per cent of workers were paid government employees, 7.20 per cent of workers were paid statutory body employees, 54.93 per cent were paid private employees, 2.67 per cent were paid private home employees, 4.93 per cent were self-employed with paid employees, 8.86 per cent were self-employed without paid employees, 0.95 per cent had another worker status, and 0.85 per cent dn/ns.

According to the 2011 census, there were 350 business owners living in the parish. 17.82 per cent made under EC$1,000 per month from their business, another 17.82 percent made $1,000 to $1,999 per month from their business, 21.15 per cent made $2,000 to $2,999 per month, 18.73 per cent made $3,000 to $4,999 per month, and 24.47 per cent made over $5,000.

According to the 2011 census, 1.90 per cent of workers were paid a daily salary, 30.92 per cent of workers were paid a weekly salary, 21.59 per cent of workers were paid a fortnightly salary, 44.45 per cent of workers were paid a monthly salary, and 1.15 per cent of workers were paid at some other rate.

== Education ==
In 2011, of all the people in Saint George, including those in school or those that have not begun school, 3.68% had no education, 1.23% had their highest level of education be day-care education, 2.23% preschool, 1.88% pre-infant/kindergarten, 5.32% primary/elementary (1-3), 14.11% primary/elementary (4-7), 3.78% junior secondary, 8.60% secondary form 1–3, 27.75% secondary form 4–5, 0.89% sixth form ("a" level lower), 2.65% sixth form ("a" level upper), 1.01% post secondary, 10.12% college, 1.47% post primary/vocational, 0.45% special education, 8.86% university, 1.53% other, and 4.43% didn't know/didn't state. 2,224 people attended school full time, and 200 people attended school part-time.

In 2011, there were 2,424 attending an educational institution. 3.54% of those people attended a daycare, 7.51% attended preschool, 12.93% government primary school, 25.55% private primary school, 28.12% secondary school, 7.07% community college, 1.27% vocational/trades school, 2.66% adult education, 7.38% university, 1.31% special education, and 2.66% didn't know or didn't state.

=== Examinations ===
In 2011, 42.05% of people had no examination, 8.21% had a school leaving certificate, 2.48% had a high school certificate, 4.84% had a Cambridge School/CXC examination, 13.68% had a GCE 'O' level/CXC General, 2.26% had a GCE 'A' Levels, CAPE, 8.12% had a college certificate, 3.09% had an associate degree, 4.63% had a bachelor's degree, 0.52% had a post graduate diploma, 2.38% had a professional certificate, 1.84% had a masters or doctoral degree, 0.29% had another degree, and 5.60% didn't know or didn't state their examination level.

In people of African descent, 43.20% had no examination, 8.25% had a school leaving certificate, 2.27% had a high school certificate, 4.98% had a Cambridge School/CXC examination, 13.73% had a GCE 'O' level/CXC General, 2.14% had GCE 'A' Levels, CAPE, 8.07% had a college certificate, 2.96% had an associate degree, 4.38% had a bachelor's degree, 0.46% had a post graduate diploma, 1.98% had a professional certificate, 1.56% had a master's/doctoral degree, and the remainder had other examinations, or didn't know/state their examination level.

=== Training ===
In 2011, of the 2,177 people asked, 82.55% had completed training, 8.85% were undergoing training, 6.13% attempted training but did not complete it, and 2.48% didn't know out didn't state their training status. 36.80% had on the job training, 5.54% had an apprenticeship, 4.28% had a correspondence course, 1.17% had secondary school, 28.39% had vocational training, 1.80% had commercial training, 2.67% had business/computer training, 9.53% had university on campus training, 4.42% private study, 3.79% other, and 1.60% didn't know or didn't state their training method.

26.64% had no training qualification, 31.99% had a certificate with examination, 9.29% had a certificate without examination, 9.77% had a diploma or advanced diploma, 2.72% had an associated degree, 3.79% had a first degree or post graduate degree, 9.04% had a professional qualification, 0.97% had another qualification, and 5.79% didn't know or didn't state.

== See also ==
- St. George (constituency)
- St. George Parish Church
