= Barbuda Codrington Airport =

Airport in Antigua and Barbuda

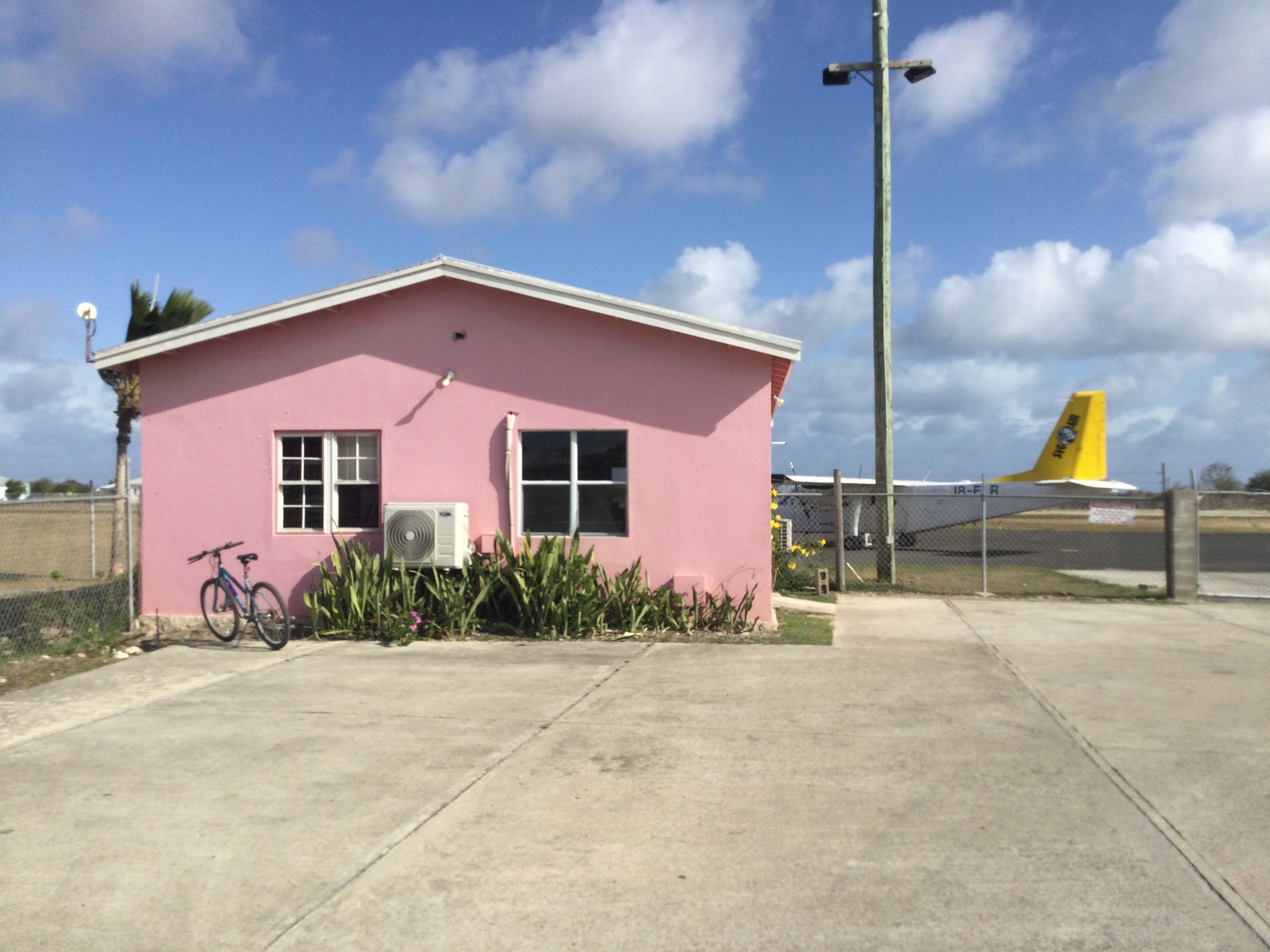
- IATA: ~~BBQ~~; ICAO: ~~TAPH~~

Summary
- Airport type: Public
- Operator: Antigua and Barbuda Airport Authority
- Serves: Codrington, Barbuda, Antigua and Barbuda
- Closed: 2 October 2024
- Elevation AMSL: 15 ft (4.6 m)
- Coordinates: 17°38′09″N 061°49′37″W

Map
- Location in Barbuda

Runways
Direction	Length		Surface
Direction	m	ft	Surface
10/28	500	1,640	Paved
- Sources: GCM, STV

Barbuda Codrington Airport (IATA: ~~BBQ~~, ICAO: ~~TAPH~~) was a public airport serving the village of Codrington, on the island of Barbuda. Its runway is only 500 metres long, only sufficient for STOL or very light aeroplanes.

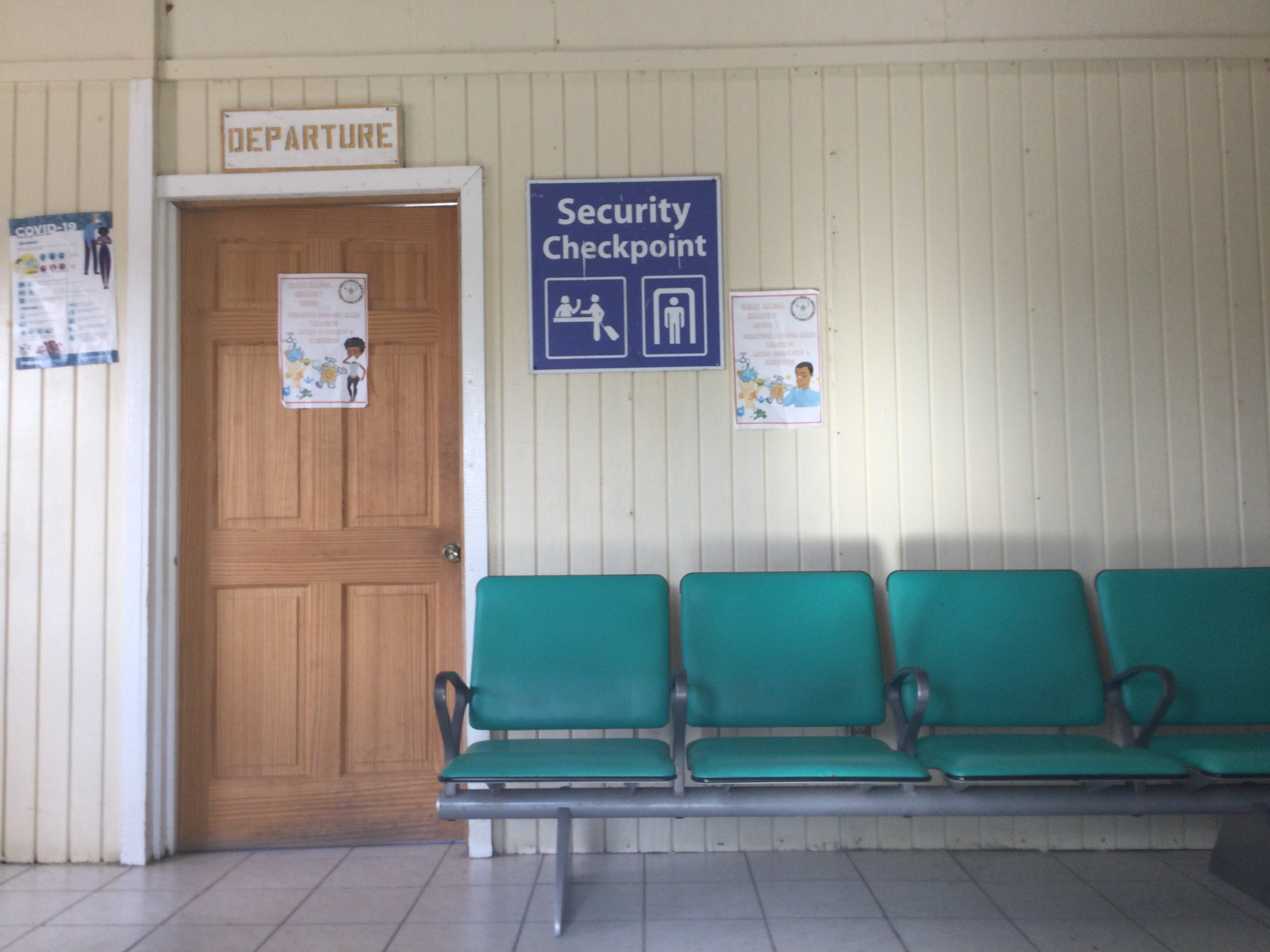
The interior of the airport.

In September 2017, Hurricane Irma seriously damaged Barbuda Codrington Airport, and as a result, Antiguan and Barbudan authorities shut down the airport until repairs were completed. The airport reopened shortly after and continued to operate normally in the following years.

The airport closed permanently in the evening of 2 October 2024. It was replaced by Burton–Nibbs International Airport the following morning.

== Airlines and destinations ==
Barbuda Codrington Airport no longer has any commercial service. These are the airlines that flew there during the time of closure:

Airlines	Destinations
Anguilla Air Services	Charter: Anguilla (suspended)
BMN Air	Antigua
Caribbean Helicopters	Antigua
FlyMontserrat	Antigua
St Barth Commuter	Charter: Saint Barthélemy (suspended)
Trans Anguilla Airways	Charter: Anguilla (suspended)
