= Aviation in Antigua and Barbuda =

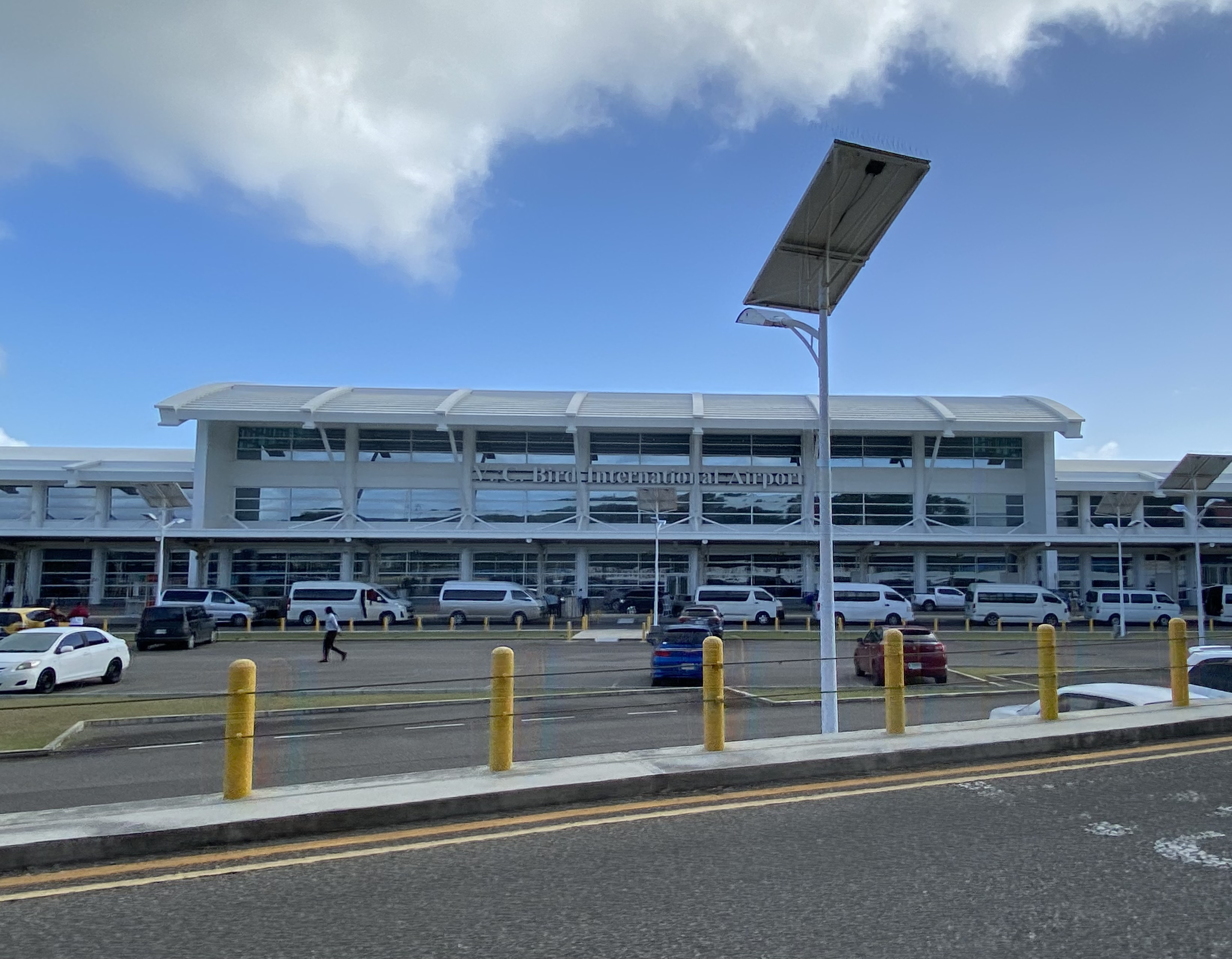
V. C. Bird International Airport in December 2021

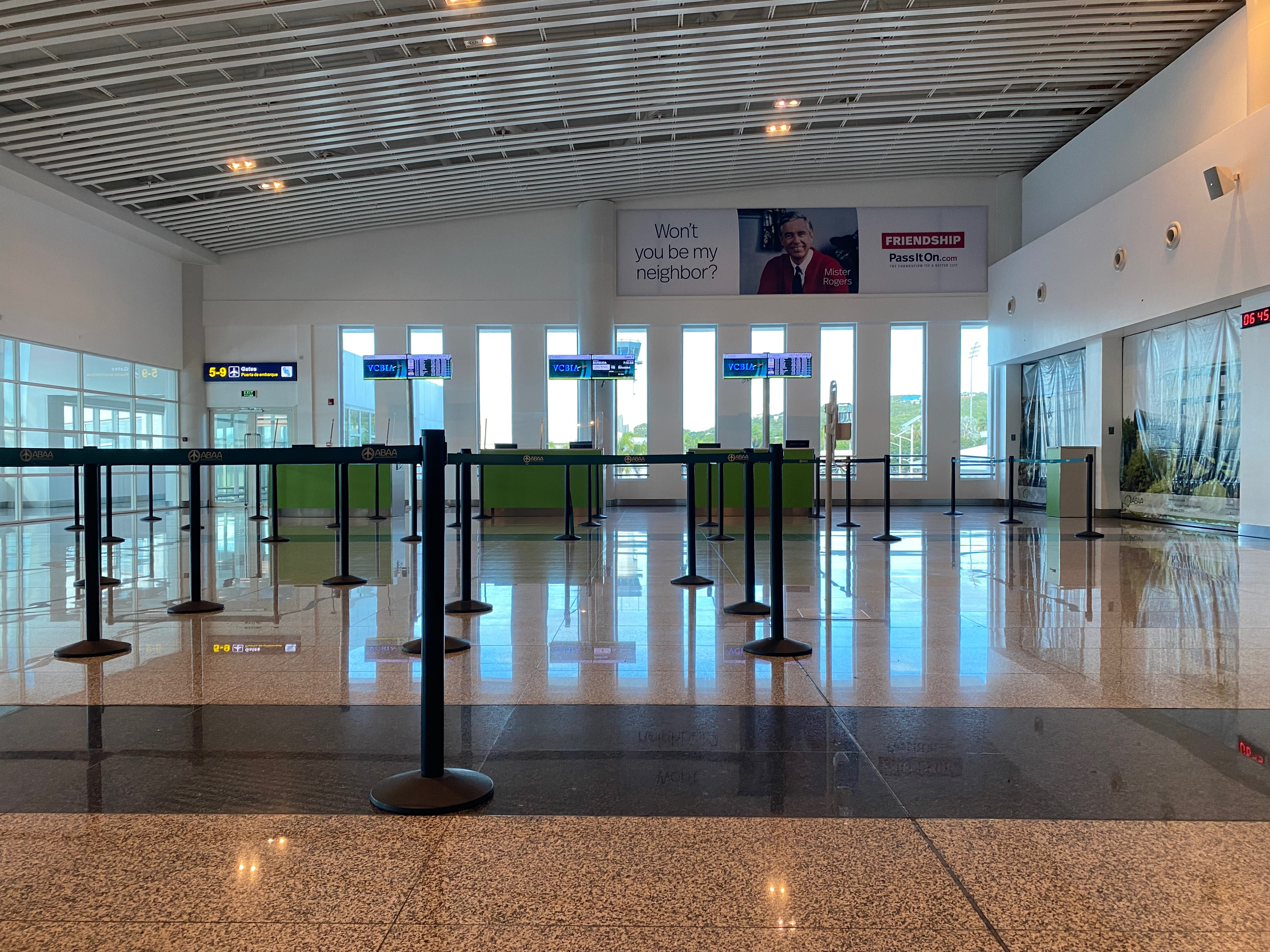
Interior of V. C. Bird International Airport in July 2023

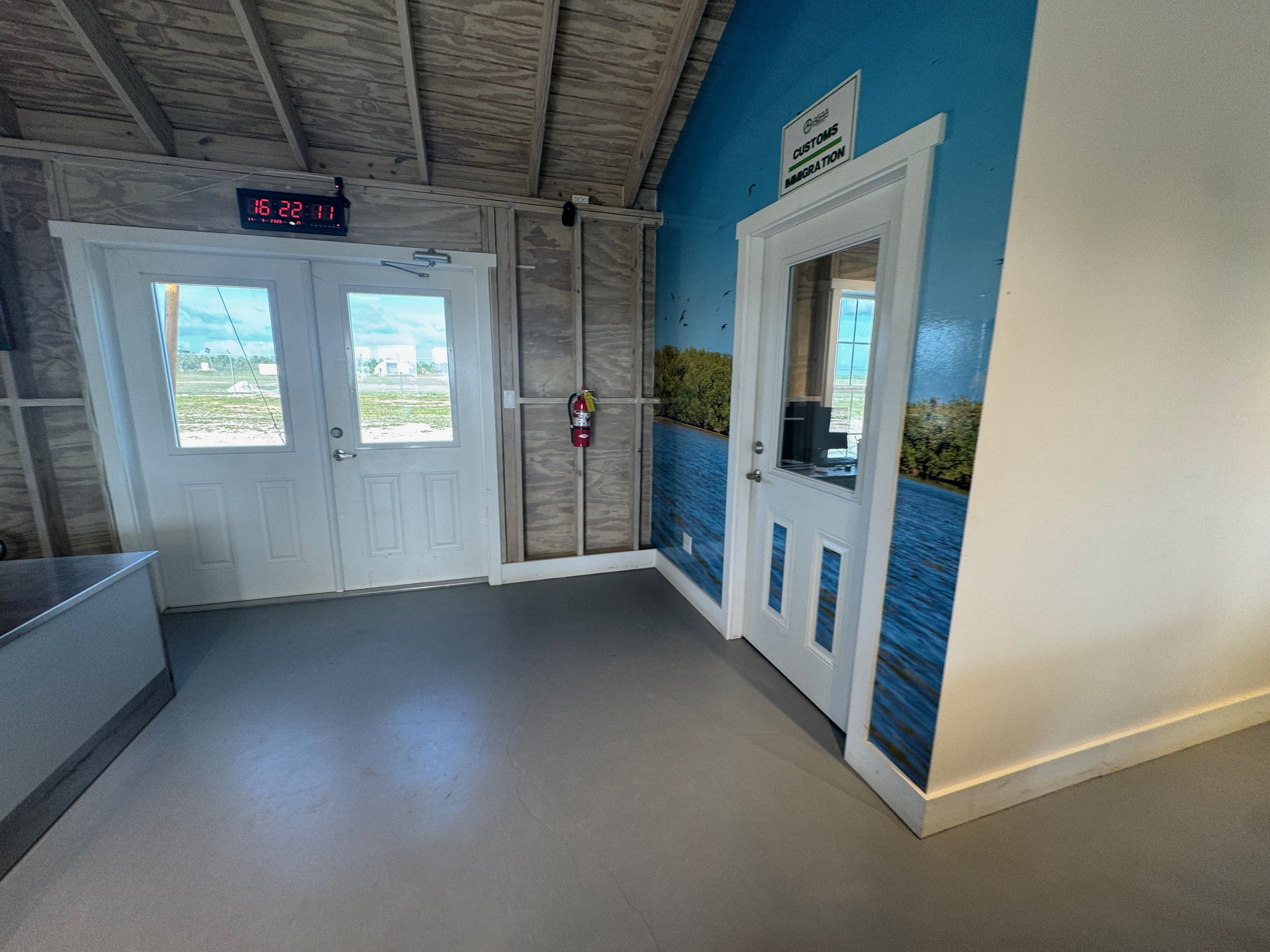
Interior of Burton–Nibbs International Airport

Antigua and Barbuda maintains a significant aviation industry. In December 2024, there were two main commercial airports, V. C. Bird International Airport and Burton–Nibbs International Airport. The civil aviation industry is largely controlled by the central government, owning the largest airline, Liat Air. However, the domestic flight industry was until recently dominated by small airlines like BMN Air. Antigua and Barbuda also has a significant military aviation sector, being one of the only countries in the Caribbean to maintain an air force.

== History ==
=== Early history ===
The first planes that landed in Antigua and Barbuda were seaplanes that transported passengers in and out of St. John's Harbour. Villa Airstrip was later established, with a small terminal in the community now known as Old Runway. The first commercial flight landed at the airstrip in March 1943.

=== World War II ===
In the late 1930s, Antigua's economy was struggling heavily due to the Great Depression. In 1940, when the United States expressed interest in establishing bases in the island, it provided an alternative to working in the failing sugar industry. Two bases were established, a Naval Air Station in Crabbs, and an Army Air Base in what was then Coolidge. Planes began landing at the Army Air Base on 6 June 1941, and seaplanes at the Naval Air Station on 25 June 1941. These bases however remained under construction until spring 1942. However, their service life was brief, and by February 1944, the Crabbs base was a Naval Auxiliary Air Facility, and in December 1943, Coolidge was reduced to air patrols. Crabbs went into "caretaker" status in January 1945.

=== Post-World War II ===
The bases remained under the control of the Americans until 1949. After this, Coolidge Airport was established. In October 1956, the first LIAT flight from Montserrat landed in Coolidge, piloted by the Kittitian entrepreneur Frank Delisle. At the time, the airline only had one aircraft, but it expanded to two in 1957, also expanding its route network to Dominica and Barbados.

=== Post-independence ===
In 1981, Antigua and Barbuda gained independence. In 1985, Coolidge Airport was renamed to V. C. Bird International Airport. The airport has had three terminal buildings, the newest opening on 26 August 2015, CARICOM describing it as the most modern terminal in the Caribbean. After much controversy, on 3 October 2024, the Burton–Nibbs International Airport opened, replacing the old Barbuda Codrington Airport. In October 2024, the first jet aircraft also landed in Barbuda, operated by LIAT. As of December 2024, the airport is functioning, but is still awaiting expansion.

== Airports ==
Current and former airports and seaplane bases in Antigua and Barbuda

All public airports in Antigua and Barbuda are operated by the Antigua and Barbuda Airport Authority. These airports are also used by the defence force's Air Wing at specialized hangars. In the 2024 government budget, $7.5 million went to the civil aviation ministry and $83.5 million went to V. C. Bird International Airport. Under the Civil Aviation Act of 2003, airport security officers in Antigua and Barbuda are specialized members of the Royal Police Force of Antigua and Barbuda. In Antigua, they are assigned to the Airport Post.

== Airlines ==
Antigua and Barbuda does not have an official flag carrier. Overseas flights are usually operated by foreign airlines, while LIAT and various small Caribbean operators run regional flights. The domestic flight market is dominated by BMN Air, although LIAT has recently entered it.
