= List of airports in Antigua and Barbuda =

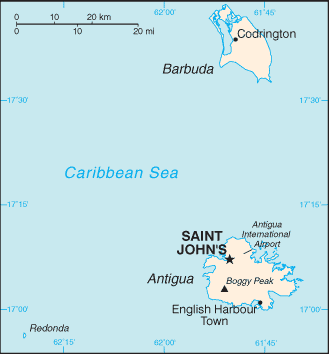
Map of Antigua and Barbuda

There are three airports operating in Antigua and Barbuda, a nation lying between the Caribbean Sea and the Atlantic Ocean. Antigua and Barbuda consists of two major inhabited islands, Antigua and Barbuda, and a number of smaller islands (including Great Bird, Green, Guinea, Long, Maiden and York Islands). Separated by a few nautical miles, the group is in the middle of the Leeward Islands, part of the Lesser Antilles.

== Airports ==
Boldface indicates the airport has scheduled passenger service on commercial airlines.

| City served | Island | ICAO | IATA | Airport name | Coordinates |
|---|---|---|---|---|---|
| St. John's | Antigua | TAPA | ANU | **V. C. Bird International Airport** | 17°08′12″N 61°47′34″W |
| Codrington | Barbuda | TAPB | BBQ | **Burton–Nibbs International Airport** | 17°37′23″N 61°47′53″W |

=== Former airports ===
| City served | Island | ICAO | IATA | Airport name | Coordinates |
|---|---|---|---|---|---|
| Codrington | Barbuda | TAPH | BBQ | **Barbuda Codrington Airport** | 17°38′09″N 61°49′43″W |
| Coco Point | Barbuda | TAPT | | Coco Point Lodge Airstrip (private) | 17°33′20″N 61°45′55″W |
| St. John's | Antigua | | | Villa Airstrip | 17°08′19.0″N 61°50′57.4″W |

== Heliports ==
| City served | City located | Island | ICAO | IATA | Airport name | Coordinates | Helipads | References |
|---|---|---|---|---|---|---|---|---|
| St. John's | St. John's | Antigua | none | none | Fort Road Heliport | 17°08′04″N 61°51′26″W | 2 | |
| Jolly Harbour | Orange Valley | Antigua | none | none | Orange Valley Heliport | 17°02′54″N 61°53′27″W | 1 | |

== See also ==
- Aviation in Antigua and Barbuda
- List of airports by ICAO code: T#TA - Antigua and Barbuda
- Wikipedia: WikiProject Aviation/Airline destination lists: North America#Antigua and Barbuda
