= Burton–Nibbs International Airport =

Airport in Barbuda, Antigua and Barbuda

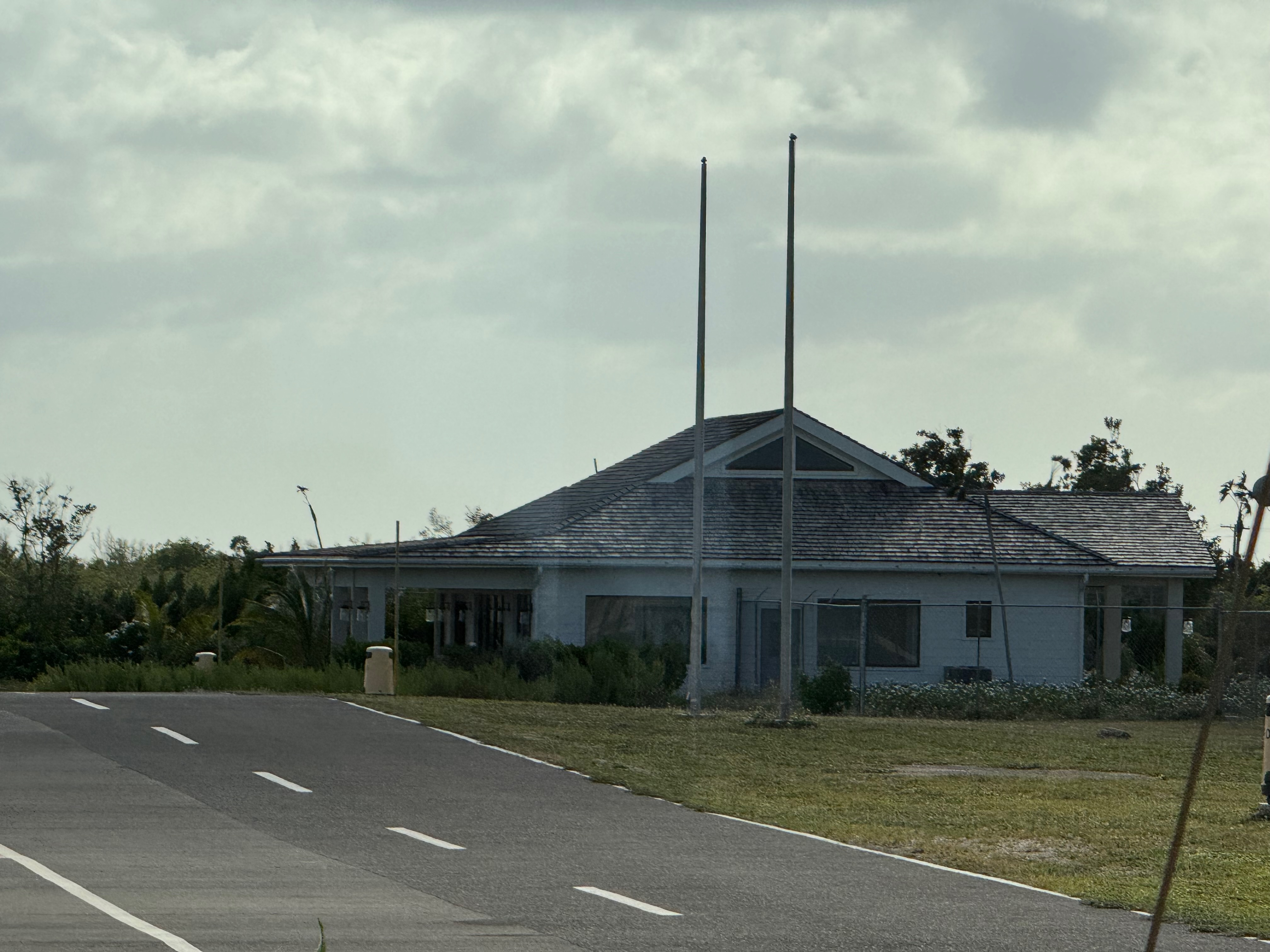
- IATA: BBQ; ICAO: TAPB

Summary
- Airport type: Public
- Owner: Antigua and Barbuda Airport Authority
- Serves: Barbuda, Antigua and Barbuda
- Coordinates: 17.623559°N 61.798421°W

Map
- Location in Barbuda

Runways
Direction	Length		Surface
Direction	m	ft	Surface
10/28	1,859	6,099	Asphalt
- Source: Antigua News Room https://acukwik.com/Airport-Info/TAPB

Burton–Nibbs International Airport (IATA: BBQ, ICAO: TAPB) is an international airport in Barbuda, one of the main islands in Antigua and Barbuda. The airport is in the central portion of Barbuda, east of Codrington village. The project cost $55 million and was handled by a company called Bahamas Hot Mix. It is one of the most controversial developments of the Barbuda crisis.

The airport replaced Barbuda Codrington Airport, which closed in the evening of 2 October 2024. The new airport opened in the morning of 3 October 2024. On 12 September 2024, the Cabinet of Antigua and Barbuda announced that the airport would be named after Eric Burton and Arthur Nibbs. The name was chosen due to Burton and Nibbs's stance in favor of a unitary Antigua and Barbuda, and due to Nibbs' stance against the Barbuda Land Acts. Burton's family has requested his name be removed from the facility.

An official naming ceremony for the airport will be held on 1 November 2026.

== Airlines and destinations ==
Airlines	Destinations
BMN Air	Antigua
CalvinAir Helicopters	Antigua
Caribbean Helicopters	Antigua
FlyMontserrat	Charter: Antigua, Montserrat
Liat Air	Antigua

== See also ==
- List of airports in Antigua and Barbuda
- Barbuda Codrington Airport
