= Flight 107 =

Flight 107 may refer to:

Listed chronologically

- LAN-Chile Flight 107, crashed on 6 February 1965
- Balkan Bulgarian Airlines Flight 107, crashed on 16 March 1978
- FlyMontserrat Flight 107, crashed on 7 October 2012

== See also ==
- STS-107, a Space Shuttle mission that ended with destruction of the Columbia on 1 February 2003
