= TRPG =

TRPG may refer to:

- Tactical role-playing game
- Tabletop role-playing game
- John A. Osborne Airport (ICAO code TRPG)
