= Vieques Air Link Flight 901A =

Airplane crash in 1984 in Puerto Rico

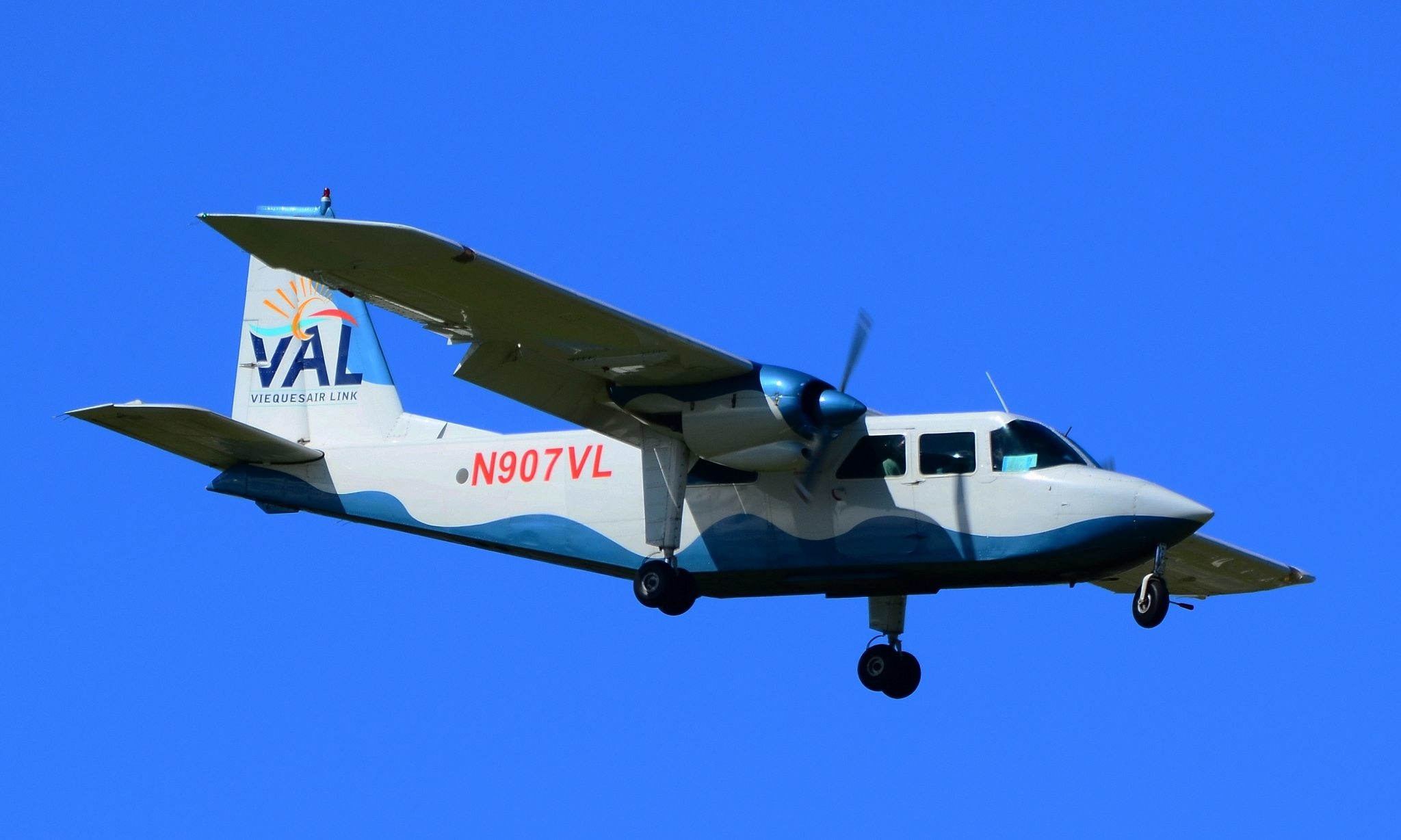
- Vieques Air Link Britten-Norman BN-2A-9 Islander, similar to the crashed aircraft but with a later VAL livery

Accident
- Date: August 2, 1984
- Summary: Pilot error
- Site: Vieques, Puerto Rico

Aircraft
- Aircraft type: Britten-Norman Islander
- Operator: Vieques Air Link
- Registration: N589SA
- Flight origin: Vieques Airport
- Destination: St. Croix, United States Virgin Islands
- Occupants: 9
- Passengers: 8
- Crew: 1
- Fatalities: 9
- Survivors: 0

Vieques Air Link Flight 901A was a flight from Vieques Airport in Vieques, Puerto Rico, to St. Croix, United States Virgin Islands that crashed on August 2, 1984, killing all nine passengers and crew on board.

== Crash ==
The flight was operated by a Britten-Norman Islander, registration N589SA. After refueling at Vieques Airport, the aircraft took off with one crew member, its pilot, and eight passengers, at 7:55 AM. According to an airport mechanic, the aircraft then lost altitude, the pilot regaining it momentarily before the aircraft banked to its left and nosedived into the Atlantic Ocean.

== Passengers ==
The oldest recorded passenger was a 75-year-old man and the youngest one an 11-year-old boy. Additionally, there were two passengers, both women, whose ages were not revealed.

== Investigation ==
In the course of its investigation the National Transportation Safety Board (NTSB) learned that on March 13, 1984, the young, 21 years old pilot had completed training at a flying school to obtain a commercial pilot's license, but was not qualified to fly as a pilot-in-command of a commuter airliner, being restricted to air charter operations only.

Further investigation revealed that the aircraft's left hand fuel tank had been filled with fuel from an underground tank contaminated with water from previous days of heavy rains, which ultimately caused the No.1 engine to fail. At the time the engine failed, the aircraft was over the ocean. The pilot attempted to turn the aircraft around; however, he turned in the wrong direction, causing the aircraft to flip and crash into the water.

The aircraft was also overloaded by between 600 lb (272 kg) to 700 lb (318 kg) over its maximum take-off weight.

The aircraft was required to have ten life vests installed. However, the divers who participated in the recovery mission stated that they found no life vests inside the aircraft. The NTSB investigators inspected ten life vests that the airline claimed had been recovered from the wreckage. Four were found to have loose carbon dioxide gas cylinders, used for inflation of the vests. The Federal Aviation Administration (FAA) later examined all of Vieques Air Link's life vests and found that about 40 percent of them had loose inflation cylinders.

Furthermore, it was also discovered that the aircraft's safety cards depicted a Britten-Norman Trislander, not an Islander; and that the card incorrectly showed the location of the inflation toggle and mouthpiece of the life vest type used by the airline.

Autopsies revealed that the pilot and three passengers died as a result of impact injuries; the five other passengers also had impact injuries but had drowned.

== Recommendations ==
The NTSB issued a list of recommendations in July, 1985, after investigation of this air accident.

- Pilatus-Britten Norman needed to prepare and disseminate a safety advisory to airlines and owners concerning water in fuel tanks on their aircraft.
- Airlines using Britten-Norman aircraft have to check for contamination of fuel before each aircraft's first flight of the day and after refuelling the aircraft.
- Have all Eastern Aero Marine Model G-12 life-vests checked before using, paying particular attention to CO_{2} cylinders and Technical Standard Order labelling.

== See also ==
- Pan Am Flight 526A
- US Airways Flight 1549
- Dominicana DC-9 air disaster
- 1977 Vieques Air Link crash
- FlyMontserrat Flight 107
