= Villa Airstrip =

Former airport in St. John's, Antigua and Barbuda

- IATA: none; ICAO: none

Summary
- Airport type: Public
- Serves: St. John's
- Location: Villa, St. John's
- Elevation AMSL: 23 ft / 7 m
- Coordinates: 17°08′19.0″N 61°50′57.4″W

Map
- Location of Villa Airstrip in Antigua and Barbuda

Runways
Direction	Length		Surface
Direction	ft	m	Surface
			Grass
- Source: Antigua Observer

Villa Airstrip, now popularly referred to as the Old Runway, was an airport in Villa, St. John's, Antigua and Barbuda. The airstrip was the centre of aviation in Antigua and Barbuda until the opening of Coolidge International Airport (present-day V. C. Bird International Airport). Prior to the establishment of the Villa Airstrip, the only air access to Antigua was by seaplane– planes would land in St. John's Harbour and would be processed along with ship passengers. The first commercial flight landed at Villa in March 1943, the runway was unpaved. Aircraft was large as the Douglas DC-3 would land there and the airport had a small terminal marked as 'Antigua'. The airport closed around 1949.

== See also ==
- List of airports in Antigua and Barbuda
