= FlyMontserrat Flight 107 =

2012 aviation accident

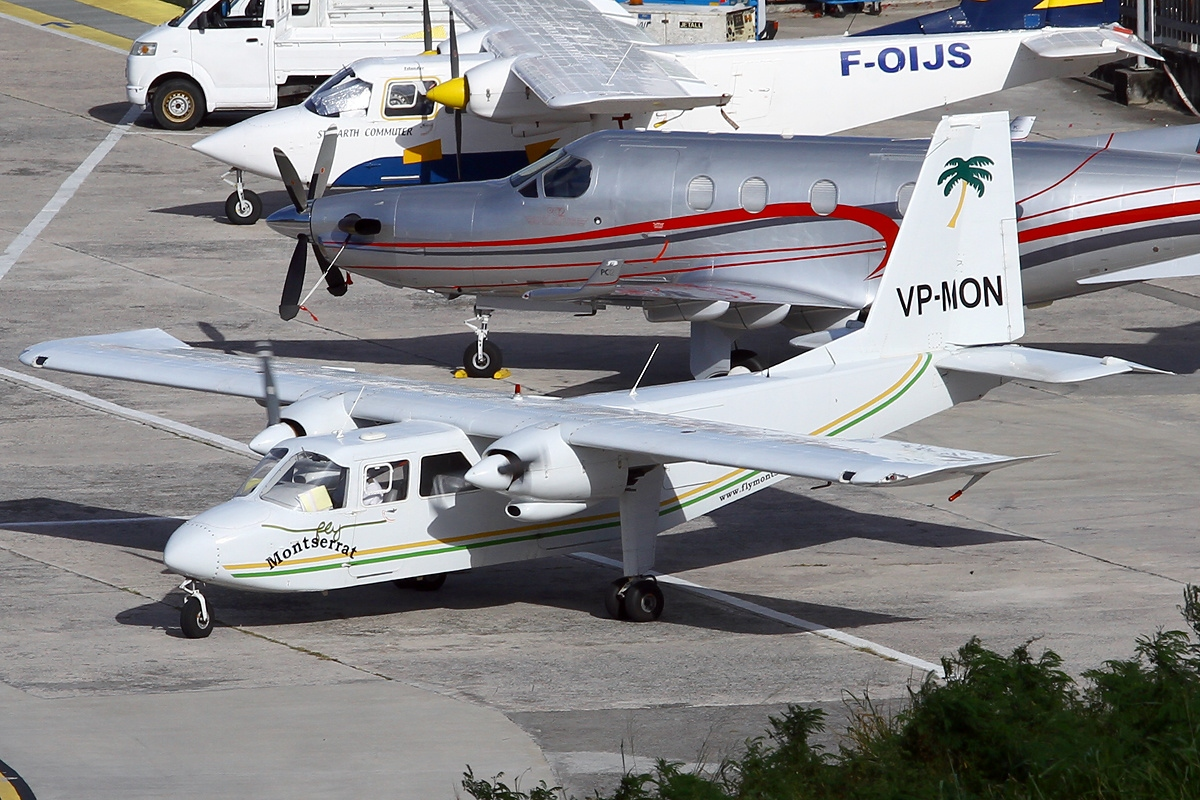
- VP-MON, the Islander involved, photographed four months before the crash

Accident
- Date: 7 October 2012
- Summary: Engine failure at take-off caused by rain that led to fuel contamination and subsequent loss of control
- Site: V. C. Bird International Airport, Antigua; 17.1333°N 61.7964°W

Aircraft
- Aircraft type: Britten-Norman Islander
- Operator: FlyMontserrat
- Registration: VP-MON
- Flight origin: V. C. Bird International Airport, Antigua
- Destination: John A. Osborne Airport, Montserrat
- Occupants: 4
- Passengers: 3
- Crew: 1
- Fatalities: 3
- Injuries: 1
- Survivors: 1

FlyMontserrat Flight 107 was a short-haul flight from V. C. Bird International Airport, Antigua to John A. Osborne Airport, Montserrat. On 7 October 2012, the Britten-Norman Islander twin-engine aircraft serving the route crashed shortly after takeoff, near the end of the runway. Three of the four occupants were killed.

== Accident ==
At 16:15 local time FlyMontserrat Flight 107 was cleared for take off from runway 07 at V. C. Bird International Airport. Shortly after the Islander took off it started to yaw to the right and stopped climbing. The aircraft continued rolling to the right and lost height; it hit the ground and cartwheeled before coming to rest and bursting into flames. The pilot and one passenger were killed on impact, another passenger succumbed to her injuries before she could be extricated from the wreckage while the final passenger was seriously injured and taken to hospital.

== Investigation ==
The Eastern Caribbean Civil Aviation Authority (ECCAA) is responsible for regulation and oversight of aviation in Antigua, where the accident occurred. Montserrat does not have its own investigators. As a British Overseas Territory this function is normally performed by the British Air Accidents Investigation Branch (AAIB), which sent a team to investigate the cause of the crash. Bad weather conditions were reported for the time prior to the accident, however conditions were reported as good at the time of takeoff.

A preliminary report by the ECCAA was released in October 2012 saying that after examining the wreckage of the aircraft, it showed that the right engine was not producing power and the propeller was not feathered. The fuel was examined and found that the fuel system showed contamination with significant quantities of water.

In July 2013, the AAIB released preliminary results of the investigation, setting out changes to prevent water contamination of Islander fuel systems; and an Airworthiness Directive was issued by the European Aviation Safety Agency (EASA) to require a check of Islanders to determine if the correct fuel filler caps had been installed. The AAIB recommended that EASA should require Britten-Norman Islander aircraft be equipped with fuel filter assemblies that minimise the likelihood of water in the fuel being fed to the engines.

== See also ==
- Dominicana Flight 603
- Vieques Air Link Flight 901A
- List of sole survivors of aviation accidents and incidents
