= FlyMontserrat =

Montserratian airline

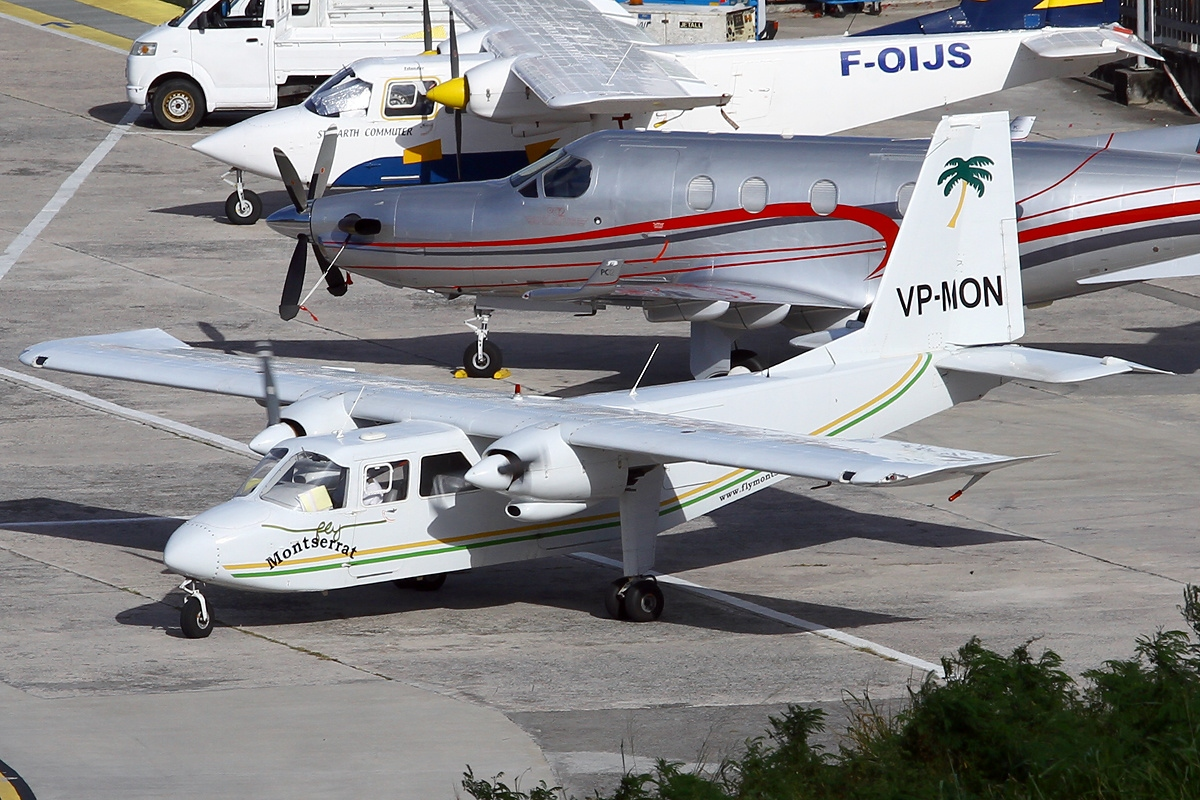
- Britten-Norman BN-2A-26 Islander, this aircraft was involved in FlyMontserrat Flight 107
| IATA | ICAO | Call sign |
|---|---|---|
| 5M | MNT | MONTSERRAT |
- Founded: 2009
- Operating bases: John A. Osborne Airport
- Destinations: 2 +16 charter destinations
- Headquarters: John A. Osborne Airport in Gerald's, Montserrat
- Website: http://www.flymontserrat.com

Montserrat Airways Ltd (MA LTD), trading as FlyMontserrat, is an airline with its headquarters at John A. Osborne Airport in Gerald's, Montserrat. The airline flies from Montserrat to and from Antigua as well as to and from Nevis, with their Britten Norman BN-2 aircraft.

== History ==
On 28 May 2009 the airline received its Air Operator's Certificate from the UK overseas Civil Aviation Authority Air Safety Support International (ASSI). On Saturday 30 May 2009 the airline's first charter flight took place. The Montserrat Tourist Board British Department for International Development (DFID) and the Tourism Challenge Fund, sponsored by the government of Montserrat, provided the funds to start the airline.

== Destinations ==
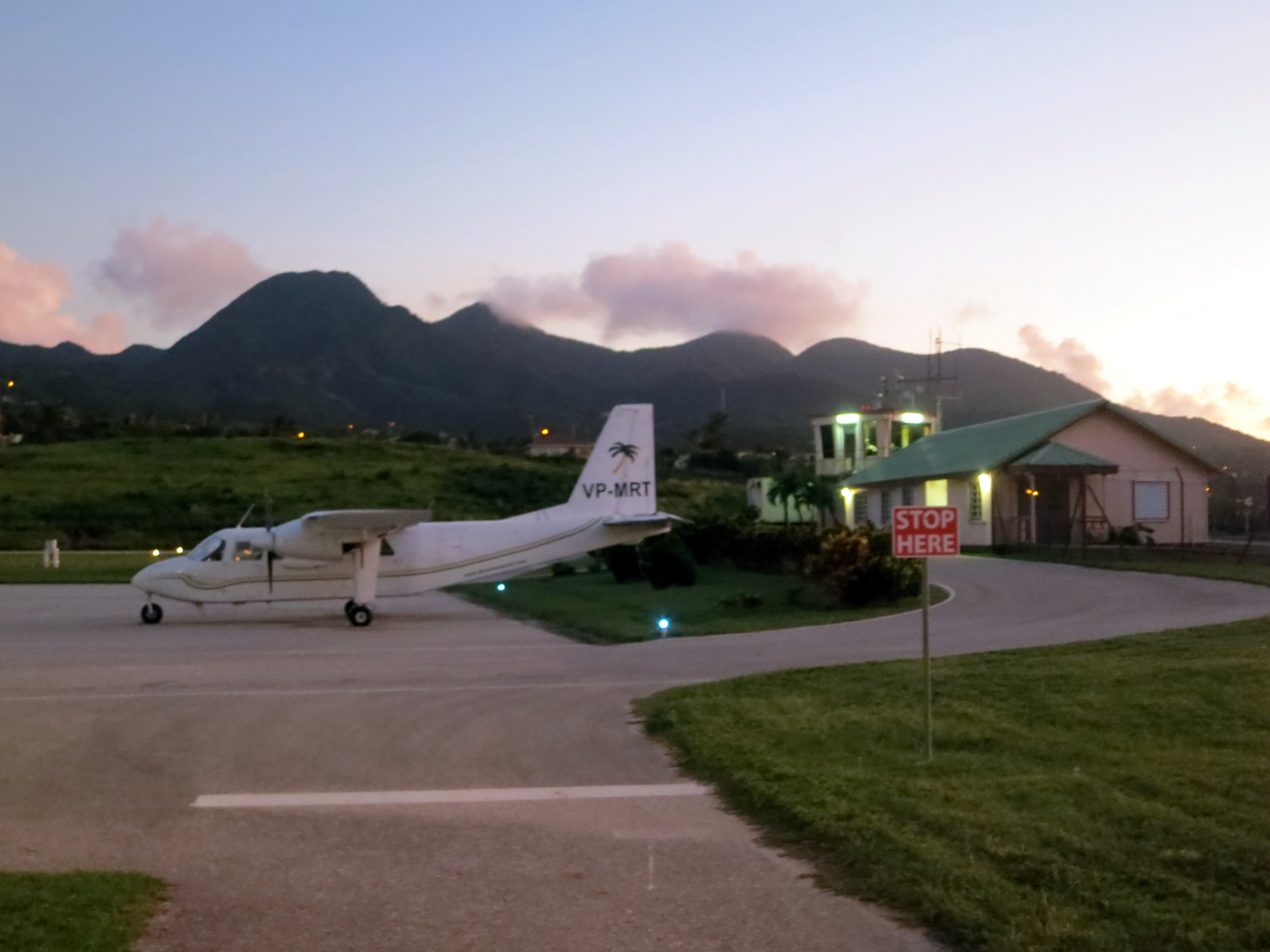
FlyMontserrat airplane at John A. Osborne Airport, Montserrat

- Burton–Nibbs International Airport (Barbuda)
- John A. Osborne Airport (Montserrat)
- V. C. Bird International Airport (Antigua)
- Vance W. Amory International Airport (Nevis)

Total: 4

== Incidents and accidents ==
- On 19 April 2011 a Fly Montserrat aircraft ran off the runway and crashed into the embankment after the aircraft endured brake trouble all weekend.
- On 7 October 2012 a Britten-Norman Islander, operating as FlyMontserrat Flight 107 to John A. Osborne Airport, crashed at V. C. Bird International Airport in Antigua and Barbuda seconds after takeoff at 4:15pm. The pilot and one of the three passengers died in the crash; another passenger died later in hospital. A Preliminary Accident Report stated that the right engine was not operating and the propeller was not feathered; and that "significant quantities" of water had been found in the fuel supply to the aircraft's starboard engine.
- On 16 October 2012, another of the airline's planes ran off the runway at the John Osborne Airport in Montserrat.
- On 23 September 2019, a FlyMontserrat plane skidded off the runway after landing at the John Osborne Airport in Montserrat.
- On 22 September 2022, a FlyMontserrat plane en route to Antigua blew an engine a few minutes after departing from Montserrat.

== Fleet ==
Fly Montserrant Fleet
| Aircraft | Total | Orders | Passengers | Notes |
|---|---|---|---|---|
| Britten-Norman BN-2 Islander | 3 | 0 | 9 |
