= Pan Am Flight 526A =

1952 aviation accident

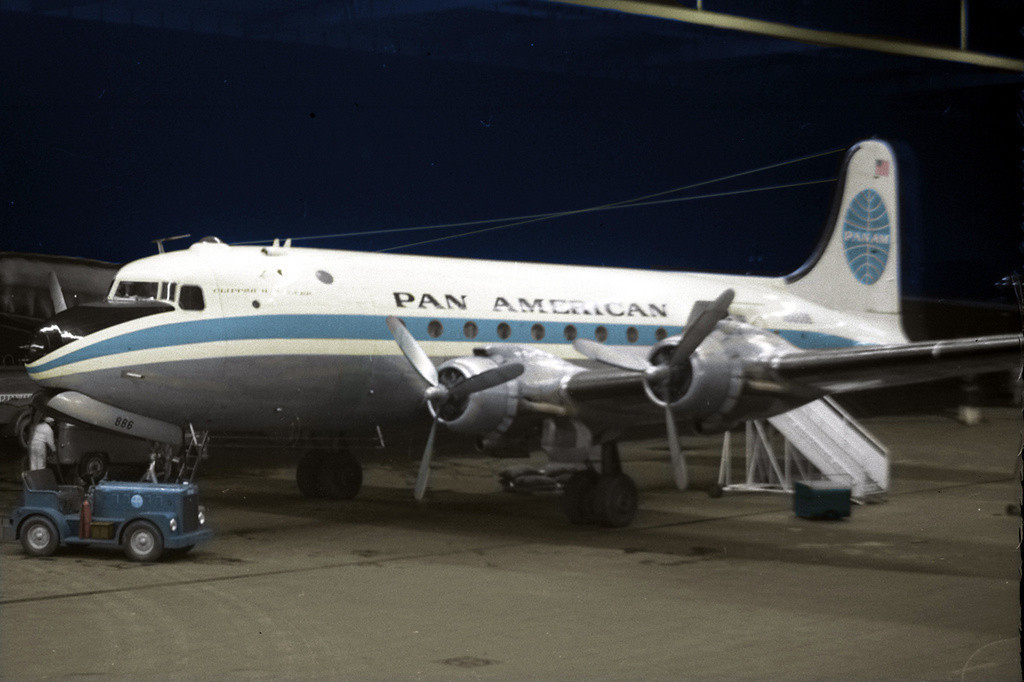
- A Douglas DC-4 similar to the accident aircraft

Accident
- Date: April 11, 1952
- Summary: Engine failure, forced ditching
- Site: 18 km (11 mi) NW off San Juan-Isla Grande Airport, San Juan, Puerto Rico; 18.5350°N 66.2514°W

Aircraft
- Aircraft type: Douglas DC-4
- Aircraft name: Clipper Endeavor
- Operator: Pan American World Airways
- Call sign: CLIPPER 526 ALPHA
- Registration: N88899 (former 42-72398)
- Flight origin: San Juan–Isla Grande Airport, Puerto Rico
- Destination: Idlewild International Airport, United States
- Occupants: 69
- Passengers: 64
- Crew: 5
- Fatalities: 52
- Survivors: 17

Pan Am Flight 526A, a Douglas DC-4, took off from San Juan–Isla Grande Airport, Puerto Rico, at 12:11 PM AST on April 11, 1952, on a flight to Idlewild International Airport, New York City, with 64 passengers and 5 crew members on board. Due to inadequate maintenance, engine number 3 failed after takeoff, followed shortly by a loss of power from engine number 4. Nine minutes after takeoff, the aircraft ditched in rough seas 18 kilometers (11 mi) NW of San Juan Airport, broke apart, and sank after three minutes. Panicking passengers refused to leave the sinking wreck, resulting in 52 passenger deaths. The United States Coast Guard rescued 17 passengers and crew members.

The accident led to the implementation of pre-flight safety demonstrations for over-water flights. The wreckage was discovered in June 2026.

== Aircraft ==
The Douglas DC-4, a piston aircraft with four Pratt & Whitney R-2000 Twin Wasp engines and Hamilton Standard propellers, had made its first flight in 1945 and had 20,835 airframe hours.

== Accident ==
On a sunny day with a gentle breeze, Clipper Endeavor took off from San Juan Airport at 12:11 PM on April 11, 1952, on a flight to Idlewild Airport, New York. Sixty-four passengers and five crew members were on board, including Captain John C. Burn, a well-qualified and seasoned pilot, in command. Burn had been the first officer and one of the few survivors of a seaplane that crashed into the Tague River upon arriving in Lisbon during World War Two.

Just after takeoff, engine number 3 failed at 350 feet (110 m). The flight crew feathered its propeller (turned its blades parallel to the direction of flight to reduce drag) and turned back to San Juan Airport. The flight continued climbing to 550 feet (170 m), when engine number 4 also lost power. Captain Burn declared an in-flight emergency and informed the control tower that he planned to attempt a water landing approximately seven miles NNW off Isla Grande.

Clipper Endeavor ditched in the Atlantic Ocean north of San Juan at 12:20 PM. Rescuers arriving shortly after reported winds of 15 knots (28 km/h; 17 mph) whipping up the sea. The rear fuselage broke off behind the bulkhead of the main cabin, and the wreckage sank in less than three minutes. Survivors later reported that many passengers had survived the initial ditching but had panicked because they feared the rough seas and the possibility of sharks and had refused to leave the sinking aircraft to board life rafts.

== Rescue ==
After receiving Captain Burn's emergency transmission, the tower notified the United States Coast Guard (USCG) rescue center, and a PBY-5A Catalina flying boat under the command of Lieutenant Ted Rapalus was airborne within six minutes. The USCG's second PBY was undergoing routine maintenance and had had its auxiliary power unit (APU) and bilge pump removed. Due to the gravity of the emergency, the PBY was removed from maintenance status and was airborne within 10 minutes under the command of Lieutenant Commander Ken Bilderback. To assist the rescue on the surface, the USCG buoy tender Bramble got underway, with medical personnel on board. Two SA-16 amphibious aircraft from Ramey Air Force Base, located at the far northwest corner of Puerto Rico, were also dispatched. Together, they rescued 12 passengers and all 5 crew members from the rough seas.

Bilderback's PBY had 15 survivors on board when it found itself in a dire situation: because of the lack of an APU and bilge pump, the flying boat had taken on a lot of sea water and had almost no power left to take off. The decision was made to transfer the survivors to the Bramble. Sea conditions worsened, and after the successful transfer of all but two teenage survivors, Bilderback's only options were to either abandon the flying boat or attempt to taxi it back on the sea to San Juan Harbor. As they passed Fort El Morro and taxied into San Juan Harbor, people lined the shore cheering the rescuers.

== Probable cause ==
The following causes were found by the investigation:

- Inadequate maintenance: engine number 3 was not changed (as should have been done per company procedure) when metal shavings were found in the engine oil in maintenance before this flight, leading to its failure immediately subsequent to take-off.
- The pilots' attempt to re-establish a climb without using all available power after the loss of power from the second engine. This led to a nose high pitch attitude and rapid decrease of airspeed which settled the aircraft at an altitude too low for an effectual recovery.

In subsequent legal proceedings, Captain Burn was exonerated, and the fault turned out to be inadequate maintenance.

== Aftermath ==
Lieutenant Commander Bilderback was awarded his second Air Medal. His co-pilot, Lieutenant Commander Jack Natwig, received the Silver Lifesaving Medal for jumping into the sea to successfully rescue a young boy. Air crew members Bill Pinkston, Jim Tierney, Peter Eustes, and Raymond Evans were all commended by the Commandant of the USCG for a job well done.

After this accident, pre-flight safety briefings about the location and usage of emergency exits and personal flotation devices before flights over open water became commonplace.

In memory of the lives lost, and in honor of the rescuers, a San Juan resident wrote a ballad.

Pan Am later reused the name Clipper Endeavor for both a Boeing 707-321B in 1962 and a Boeing 727–235 in 1980. A Douglas DC-7B was named Clipper Endeavour, using the British spelling.

== Discovery of the wreck ==
An unsuccessful search for Clipper Endeavor's wreckage was featured in an October 2024 episode of Expedition Unknown.

In June 2026, Expedition Unknown and the Air/Sea Heritage Foundation succeeded in a second search for the remains of Clipper Endeavor. The wreckage was located on the ocean floor at a depth of "some 2,000 feet [610 meters]". After discovering the wreckage, the exploration team took over 350,000 photographs of it.

The exploration team stated there were no plans to recover any of the 39 unrecovered bodies, with Air/Sea Heritage Foundation team leader Russ Matthews saying, "That is the only grave marker they are likely to ever have."

== See also ==
- Air-sea rescue
- Aviation safety
- Ethiopian Airlines Flight 961
- List of accidents and incidents involving commercial aircraft
- US Airways Flight 1549
- Vieques Air Link Flight 901A
