= Britten-Norman Trislander =

Three-engined piston airliner of the Britten-Norman BN-2 family 1970

Trislander
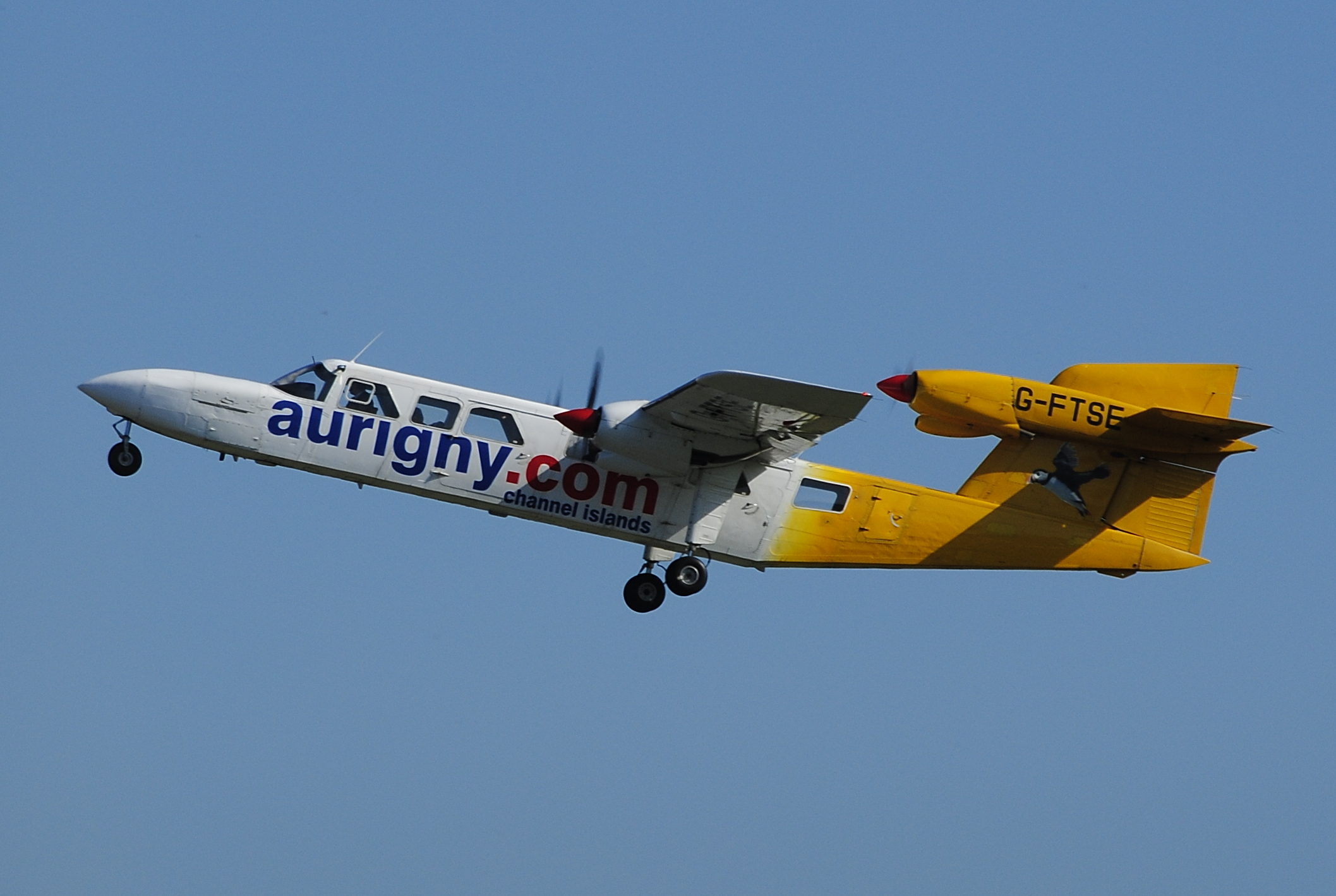
- Aurigny Air Services Trislander

General information
- Type: Airliner
- National origin: United Kingdom
- Manufacturer: Britten-Norman
- Status: In service
- Primary users: Anguilla Air Services Roraima Airways
- Number built: 80

History
- Manufactured: 1970–1982
- First flight: 11 September 1970
- Developed from: Britten-Norman Islander

The Britten-Norman Trislander (more formally designated the BN-2A Mk III Trislander) is a three-engined piston-powered utility aircraft designed and produced by the British aircraft manufacturer Britten-Norman.

The Trislander was designed in the late 1960s as an expanded derivative of the company's Islander, a twin-engined commercial aircraft that had proved to be a commercial success. In comparison to its predecessor, it had a larger carrying capacity, being capable of seating up to 18 passengers, and could also perform STOL operations when required. On 11 September 1970, the prototype Trislander performed its maiden flight; the type entered revenue service less than a year later.

Being marketed primarily as a feederliner and mostly sold to civilian operators, the Trislander was primarily manufactured at the company's facility on the Isle of Wight between 1970 and 1982. Later on, the Trislander was also produced in Romania, and delivered via Belgium to Britain for certification. Several different commuter airlines have operated the Trislander in scheduled passenger services, the largest being the Guernsey-based operator Aurigny, which flew the type for over 40 years. Despite plans to produce the Trislander at the American manufacturer International Aviation Corporation (IAC) as the Tri-Commutair, these did not come to fruition.

== Design and development ==
During the 1960s, the British aircraft manufacturer Britten-Norman, founded by John Britten and Desmond Norman, had designed and commenced production of the Islander, a twin-engined commercial aircraft that quickly proved itself to be a commercial success. Being keen to capitalise on the Islander, the company's management opted to pursue development of a larger aircraft that would be derived from its predecessor as to benefit from commonalities and to lower development costs. In 1968, the company flew a stretched variant of the aircraft, known as the BN-2E Islander Super, however, this model was never pursued through to certification in favour of a more radical alternative design - the Trislander.

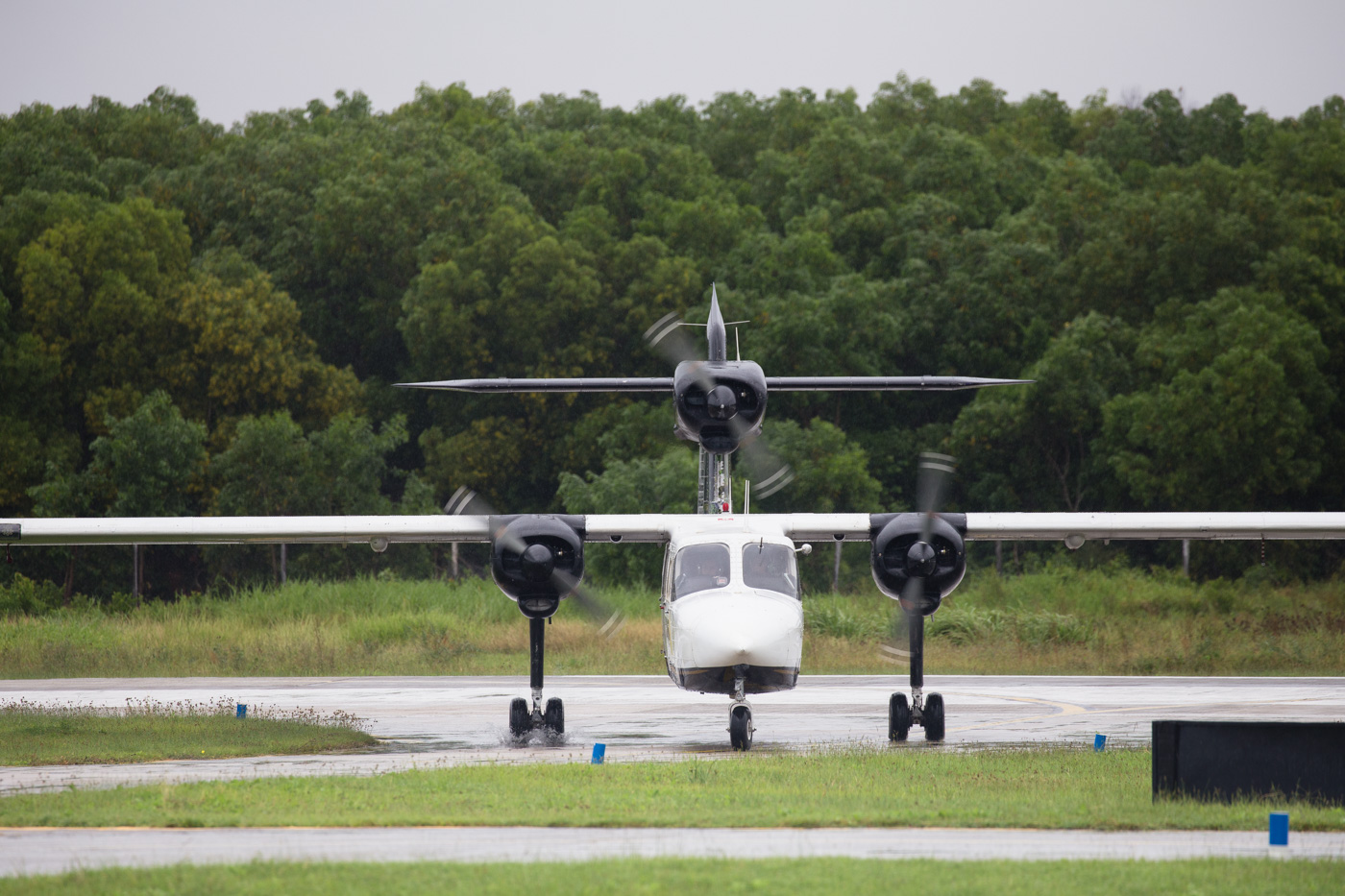
Head-on view of a Trislander. Note the third engine on the tailfin

Seeking to give the aircraft a considerably larger carrying capacity, the Islander's fuselage was stretched and strengthened considerably for the Trislander, a measure that necessitated various configuration changes The most visually apparent of these was the addition of a third engine located on the fuselage centre line atop an elongated tailfin. A fixed tricycle landing gear arrangement was also adopted. While possessing an unorthodox appearance, the arrangement proved practical; in terms of construction, the Trislander was similar enough to the Islander that the two aircraft shared the same final assembly line.

The prototype of the Trislander was constructed from the original second prototype of the Islander; it performed its maiden flight on 11 September 1970. Confidence in the type was such that it appeared at the Farnborough Air Show that same day. Britten-Norman opted to principally promote the Trislander to prospective operators as a feederliner; foreseen secondary roles included its potential use by military air services as well.

In terms of its flying characteristics, the Trislander possesses exceptional low speed handling characteristics, extended endurance, increased payload, and a relatively low noise signature. Capable of taking off from a 150 metres (492 ft) long landing strip, the Trislander can readily operate from unprepared surfaces. It was also promoted for its economical operating costs. Some variants came equipped with auto-feathering propellers and auxiliary rocket-assisted takeoff (RATO) apparatus.

== Operational history ==
During July 1971, the Trislander entered service with the Guernsey-based Aurigny, one month after the deliveries of the type had commenced. Aurigny would be the largest operator of the type, operating 16 Trislanders at its peak. In May 2017, Aurigny opted to withdraw all of its Trislanders, the type having been replaced by newer Dornier 228s. One of the ex-Aurigny Trislanders has been preserved and placed on display at the Imperial War Museum Duxford in the UK while another aircraft is displayed at Oaty & Joey's play barn at Oatlands Village in Guernsey.

Following the acquisition of Britten-Norman by the Fairey Aviation Group in August 1972 and the formation of the Fairey Britten-Norman company; the majority of manufacturing activity for both the Islander and Trislander was transferred to its Avions Fairey factory in Gosselies, Belgium. All production activity of the type in Britain ceased in 1982, by which point 73 Trilanders had been delivered while a further seven aircraft were complete but unsold; that same year, Pilatus Britten Norman sold a manufacturing license to the American manufacturer International Aviation Corporation (IAC). IAC had planned to produce an initial batch of 12 Trislanders (which were to be marketed under the name Tri-Commutairs) from parts kits supplied by Britten-Norman before undertaking full production, however, these plans ultimately came to nothing.

Into the 2020s, companies have continued to operate the Trislander; a number have been made available for private entities to hire.

== Variants ==
BN-2A Mk III-1
First production version, with short nose.

BN-2A Mk III-2
Lengthened nose and higher operating weight.

BN-2A Mk III-3
Variant certified for operation in the United States.

BN-2A Mk III-4
III-2 fitted with 350 lb (160 kg) rocket-assisted takeoff equipment.

BN-2A Mk III-5
III-2 with sound-proofed cabin, modernised cockpit/interior and new engines (proposed, unbuilt as yet).

Trislander M
Proposed military version, not built.

== Operators ==
=== Current operators ===
Anguilla

- Anguilla Air Services

Guyana

- Roraima Airways

=== Former operators ===
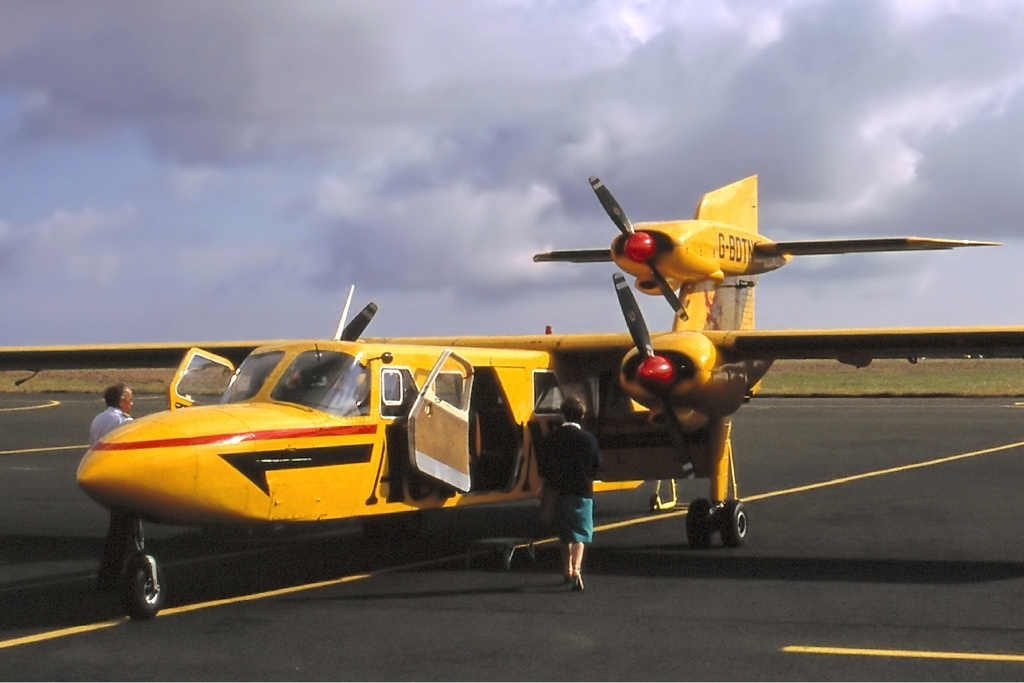
Aurigny Air Services Trislander

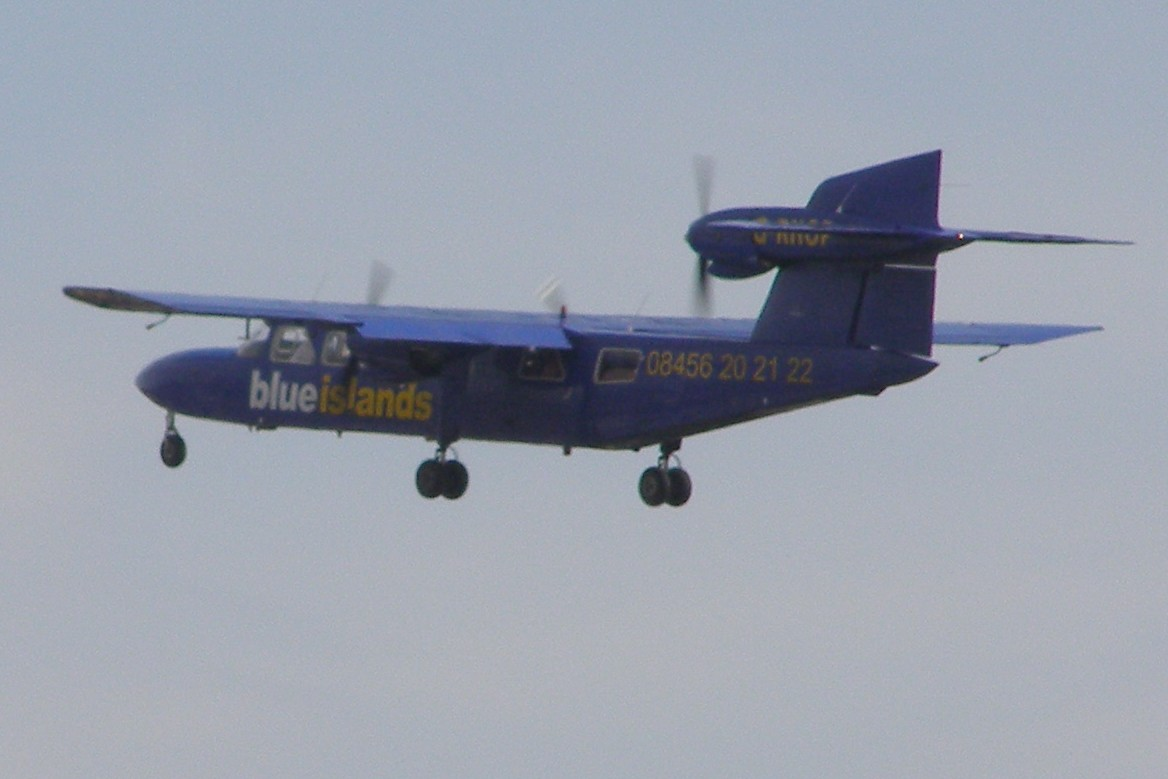
Blue Islands Trislander

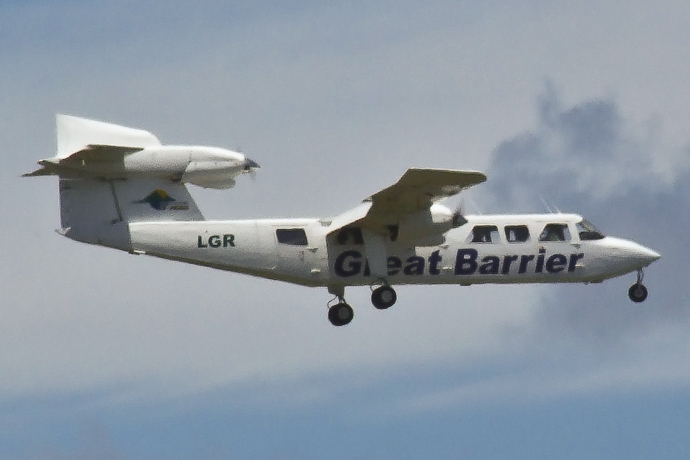
Great Barrier Airlines Trislander

Antigua and Barbuda

- LIAT

Guernsey

- Aurigny

Jersey

- Blue Islands

New Zealand

- Barrier Air

United Kingdom

- Lydd Air
- Loganair

== Accidents and incidents ==
On 8 October 1977, ZS-JYF, operated by Southern Aviation, impacted the ground while attempting a stall turn during an air display at Lanseria in South Africa. Despite sustaining severe damage (it was damaged beyond repair) the aircraft performed an emergency landing and neither occupant was injured.

On 25 October 1991, a Trislander operated by Bali International Air Service disappeared during a holding pattern near H. Asan Airport in Indonesia. There were 17 people on board, which were all presumed dead.

On 8 May 1994, an Aerocondor Britten-Norman Trislander, registered CS-DAF, operating the Lisbon–Bragança route, crash-landed into trees near the airport, following loss of power. There were no reported fatalities but the aircraft was written off.

On 15 December 2008, a Trislander operated by LAP in Puerto Rico crashed into the sea somewhere near the Turks and Caicos Islands, shortly after a distress call. A spokesman for the Asociación Nacional de Pilotos reported that the pilot's licence had been suspended in October 2006.

On 5 July 2009, a Trislander belonging to Great Barrier Airlines (now Barrier Air) lost its starboard side prop six minutes into a flight from Great Barrier Island, New Zealand, to Auckland. The propeller sheared off and impacted the fuselage, prompting a successful emergency landing. While there were injuries, no deaths were reported. The accident was caused by undetected corrosion of the propeller flange, which led to its eventual failure.

== Specifications (BN-2A Mk III-2) ==
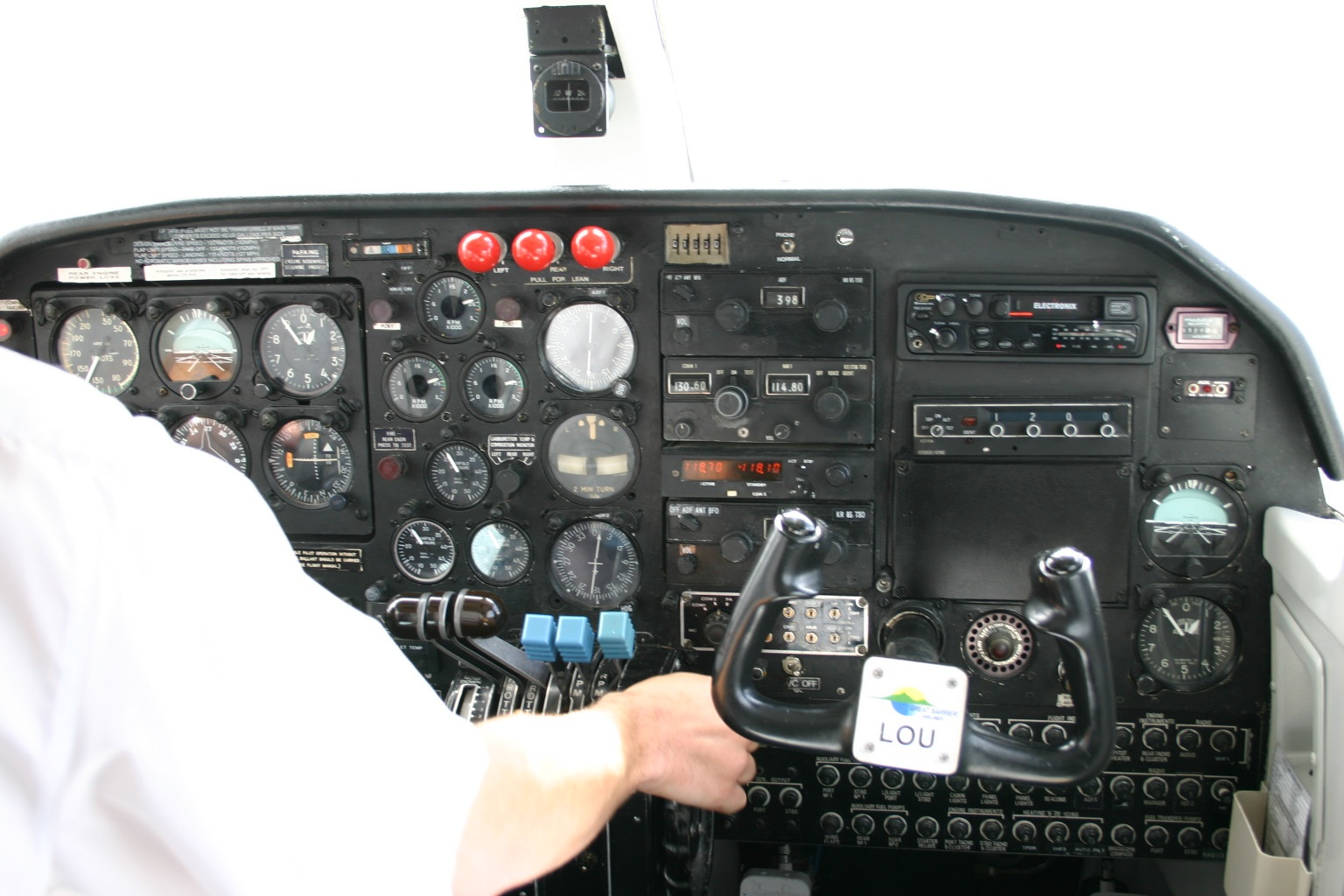
Cockpit

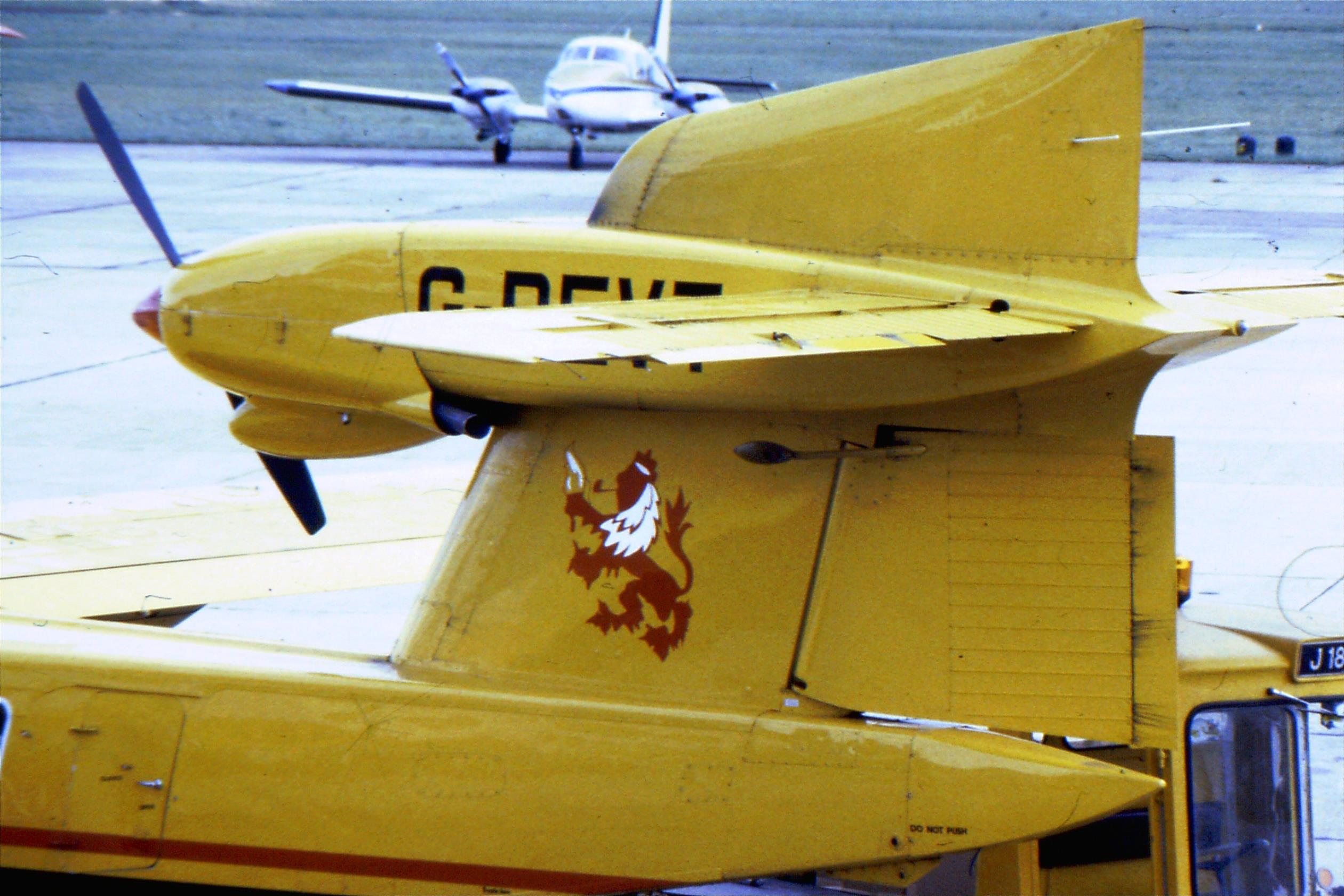
Closeup of the tail unit and the third engine

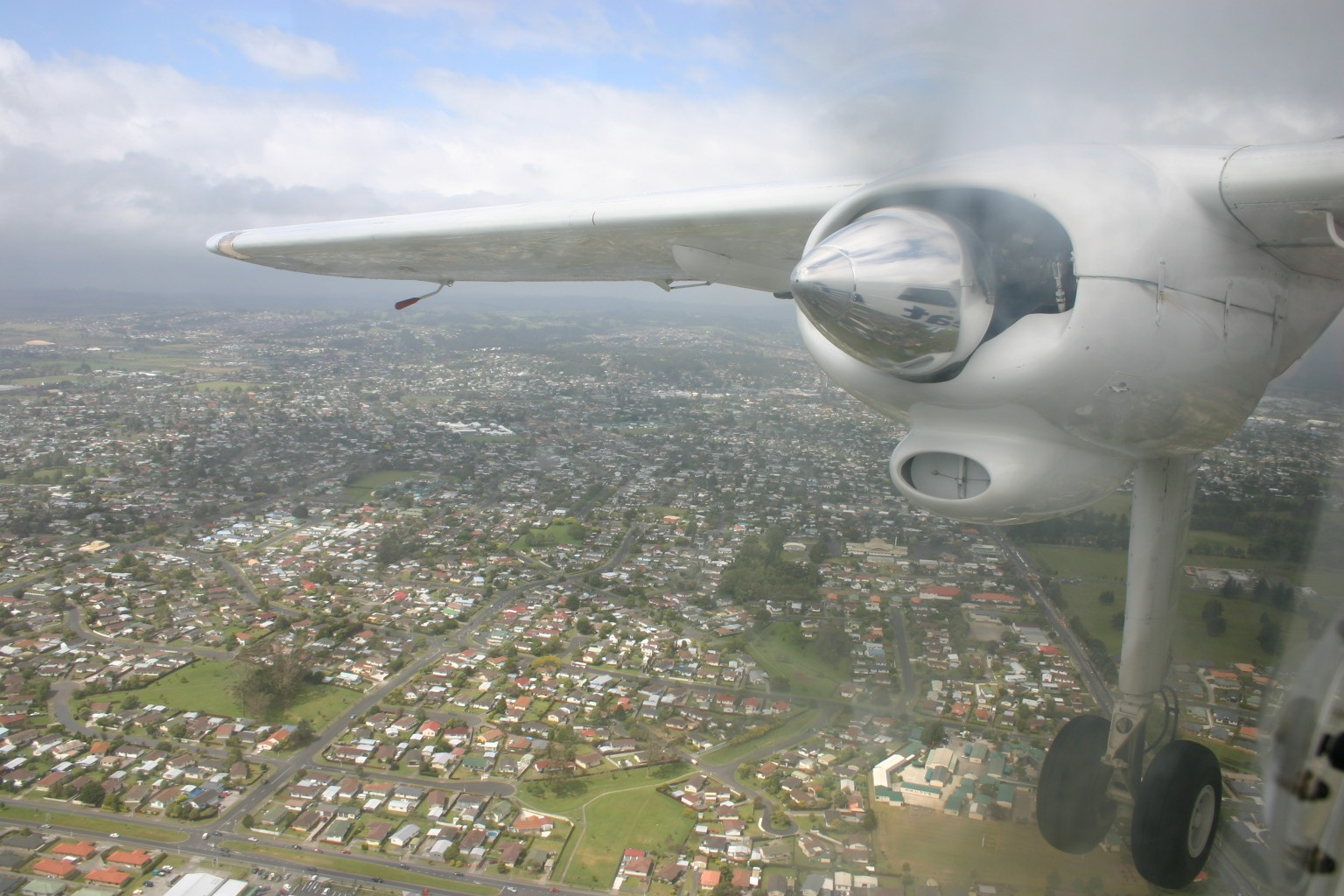
Starboard wing and engine

Data from Jane's All The World's Aircraft 1976–77

General characteristics

- Crew: 1 or 2
- Capacity: 16 or 17 passengers
- Length: 49 ft 3 in (15.01 m)
- Wingspan: 53 ft 0 in (16.15 m)
- Height: 14 ft 2 in (4.32 m)
- Wing area: 337.0 sq ft (31.31 m^{2})
- Aspect ratio: 7.95:1
- Airfoil: NACA 23012
- Empty weight: 5,842 lb (2,650 kg)
- Max takeoff weight: 10,000 lb (4,536 kg)
- Fuel capacity: 154 imp gal (185 US gal; 700 L)
- Powerplant: 3 × Lycoming O-540-E4C5 air-cooled flat-six piston engines, 260 hp (190 kW) each
- Propellers: 2-bladed Hartzell HC-C2YK-2G/C8477-4 constant speed propellers

Performance

- Maximum speed: 180 mph (290 km/h, 160 kn) at sea level
- Cruise speed: 155 mph (249 km/h, 135 kn) (59% power) at 13,000 ft (4,000 m)
- Range: 1,000 mi (1,600 km, 870 nmi)
- Service ceiling: 13,160 ft (4,010 m)
- Rate of climb: 980 ft/min (5.0 m/s)
- Take off run to 50 ft (15 m): 1,950 ft (590 m)
- Landing run from 50 ft (15 m): 1,445 ft (440 m)

== See also ==
Related development

- Britten-Norman Islander

Aircraft of comparable role, configuration, and era

- de Havilland Canada DHC-6 Twin Otter
- Dornier 228
- GAF Nomad
- Let L-410 Turbolet
