= Civil Aviation Act 2003 =

11th Parliament of Antigua and Barbuda
- Long title: AN ACT to make provision respecting the regulation, operation and control of Civil Aviation in Antigua and Barbuda.
- Citation: https://laws.gov.ag/wp-content/uploads/2018/08/a2003-25.pdf
- Status: In force

The Civil Aviation Act 2003 is an Act of the Parliament of Antigua and Barbuda. The act received royal assent on 2 February 2004.

== Summary ==
This act regulates control of civil aviation within Antigua and Barbuda.

The act includes:

=== Part II - Duties of the Minister of Civil Aviation ===
The minister is responsible for the construction, upkeep, and operation of aerodromes, as well as the establishment and provision of other facilities and services pertaining to civil aviation, fall under the purview of the Minister, who is also responsible for the development and supervision of all matters pertaining to civil aviation. In carrying out these duties, the Minister may establish and provide facilities and services for the collection, publication, or dissemination of that information.

=== Part III - The Authority ===
- The Authority is a legal entity with all the rights and obligations of a body corporate, including perpetual succession, a common seal, the ability to possess and dispose of property, and the right to bring and defend legal actions in its own name.
- The establishment of the Director General.
