= Gerald's =

- Town
- Location of Gerald's within Montserrat Gerald's (the Caribbean)
- Coordinates: 16°47′N 62°11′W
- Country: United Kingdom
- Overseas territory: Montserrat
- Time zone: UTC-4 (Atlantic)

Gerald's is a village in Montserrat, a British Overseas Territory in the West Indies, to the north of the island, in Saint Peter Parish.

The John A. Osborne Airport is in the village.

== Demographics ==
Geralds had a population of 133 in 2018. Major ethnic groups in the village included Africans (83.5%), Hispanics (11.3%), mixed (2.3%), and others (3.0%). 59.4% of the population had been born in Montserrat, with other places of birth including Guyana (10.5%), Jamaica (7.5%), unknown (1.5%), and the rest of the world (21.1%). Major religions included Anglicans (28.6%) and Seventh-day Adventists (18.8%).
