= Caribbean Helicopters =

Air charter airline based in Antigua

- Founded: 1995
- Ceased operations: 2019
- Operating bases: (Antigua and Barbuda) V.C. Bird International Airport
- Fleet size: 10
- Destinations: Montserrat; Saint Kitts and Nevis
- Website: www.caribbeanhelicopters.com

Caribbean Helicopters Limited was founded in 1995. The air charter airline is based in Antigua and provides services to Anguilla, Montserrat, Saint Kitts and Nevis, Dominica and other islands.

== Fleet information ==
- The current fleet consists of one Bell 206 JetRanger II, two Bell 206 LongRanger, 2 Piper Chieftain & 1 Britten-Norman BN-2 Islander.
