= BMN Air =

Airline in Antigua and Barbuda

- Hubs: V. C. Bird International Airport
- Destinations: 3
- Headquarters: V. C. Bird International Airport, Antigua, Antigua and Barbuda
- Website: https://bmnsvgairways.com/

BMN Air (formerly ABM Air or Antigua Barbuda Montserrat Air) is an airline of Antigua and Barbuda. Its headquarters is located at its hub at V. C. Bird International Airport serving the country's main island of Antigua with the capital, Saint John's. The company offers scheduled services to Antigua's sister island Barbuda and to the British overseas territory of Montserrat, as well as charter services between these two destinations.

The airline was set up in 2010, as a subsidiary of SVG Air.

The airline operates de Havilland Canada DHC-6 Twin Otter aircraft.

== Destinations ==
- Antigua and Barbuda
  - Antigua - V. C. Bird International Airport Hub
  - Barbuda - Burton–Nibbs International Airport
- Montserrat
  - Montserrat - John A. Osborne Airport
