= Anguilla Air Services =

Caribbean Airline

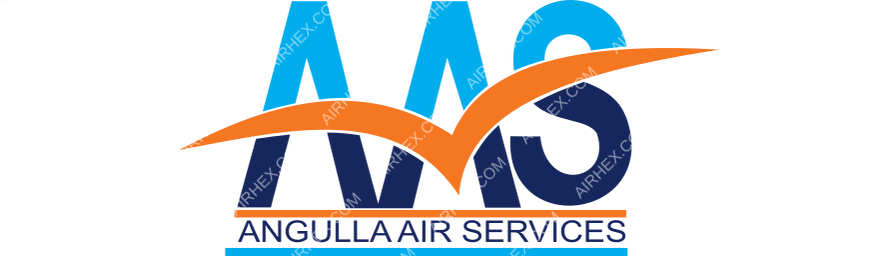
| IATA | ICAO | Call sign |
|---|---|---|
| Q3 | AXL | ANGUILLA |
- Commenced operations: 2006; 20 years ago
- Operating bases: Clayton J. Lloyd International Airport
- Fleet size: 6
- Destinations: 9
- Founder: Carl Thomas
- Website: anguillaairservices.com

Anguilla Air Services (AAS) is an airline based out of Clayton J. Lloyd International Airport (AXA / TQPF) on the Caribbean island of Anguilla. The airline offers scheduled and chartered flights to numerous destinations throughout the Caribbean.

== History ==
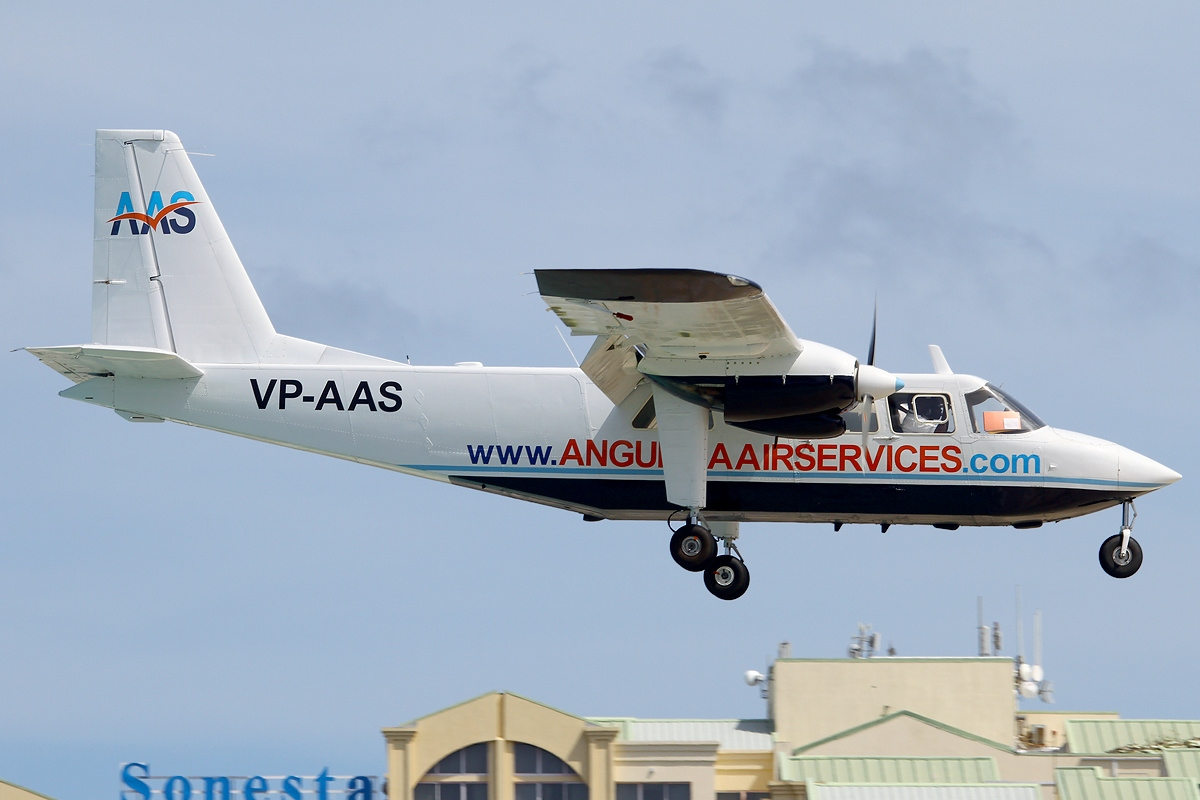
An Anguilla Air Services BN-2 Islander on final at St. Maarten. Registration: VP-AAS.

Anguilla Air Services was founded in 2006 by Carl Thomas.

In 2014, Anguilla Air Services received the World Travel Awards' "Best Airline in Anguilla" award for its operations.

In recent years, Anguilla Air Services has expanded its fleet and list of destinations to cater to a larger number of passengers. Today, it is the largest airline based in Anguilla.

== Destinations ==
Anguilla Air Services offers daily scheduled flights from Anguilla to the Islands of St. Maarten, St. Barthélemy, Saint Kitts, and Antigua These flights primarily connect passengers from Anguilla and St. Barth to international Flights at St Maarten's Princess Juliana International Airport (SXM / TNCM). The flight between St. Maarten and Anguilla is the shortest scheduled international flight in the world.

Additional services include chartered flights to many other destinations in the Caribbean. Popular locations include the Virgin Islands, Puerto Rico, St. Kitts and Nevis, Barbados, and Dominica.

== Fleet ==
=== Current fleet ===
As of August 2024, Anguilla Air Services operates a fleet of seven aircraft:

| Aircraft | Passengers |
|---|---|
| 3 Britten-Norman BN-2 Islanders | 9 |
| 1 Britten-Norman BN-2A Mk III-2 Trislander | 15-17 |
| 1 Cessna 414A Chancellor | 6-7 |
| 1 Beechcraft King Air 200 | 7 |

The airline operates one of only roughly five Britten-Norman Trislanders left flying in the world.

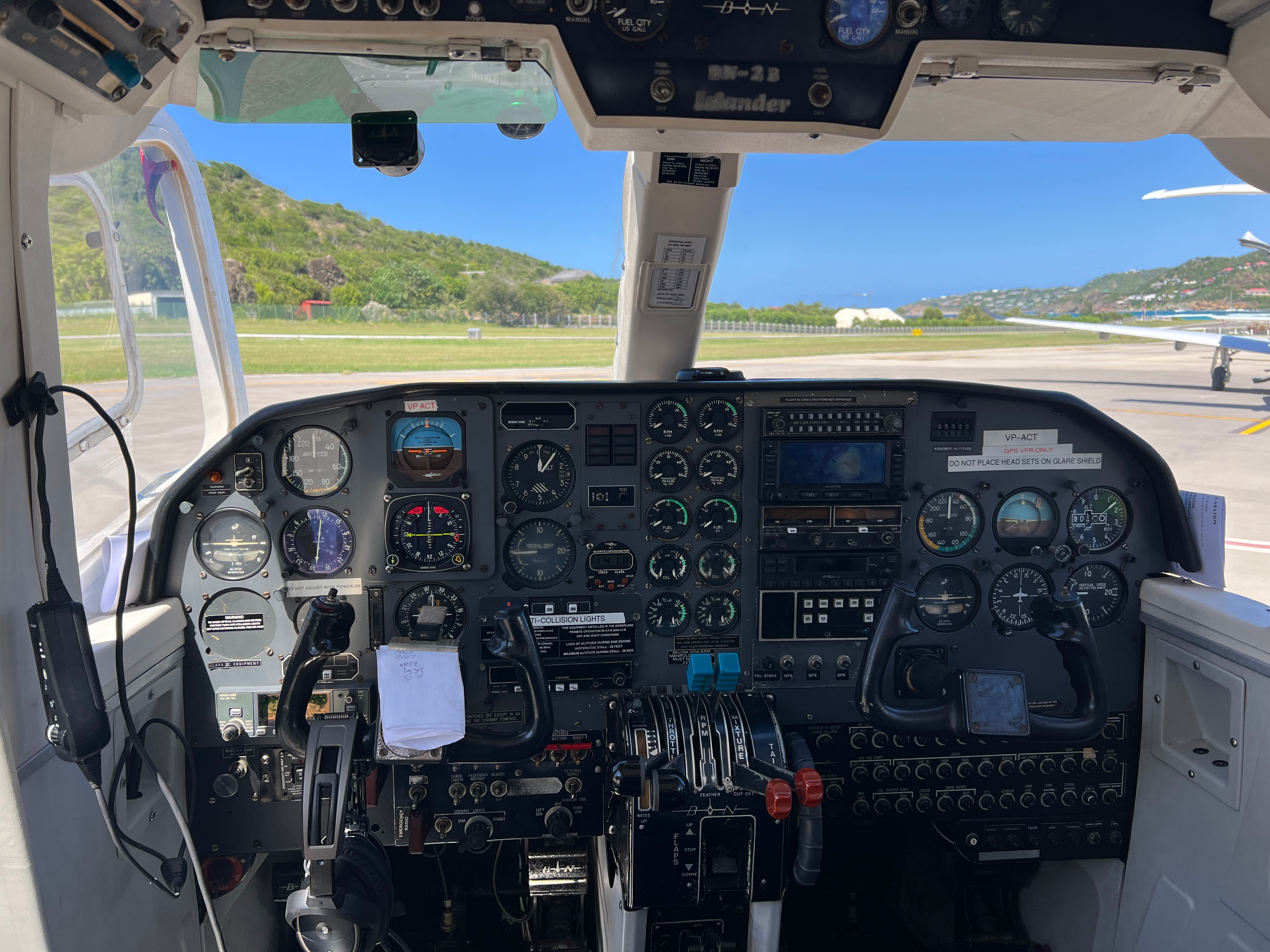
A view of the cockpit of one of Anguilla Air Services' Britten-Norman BN-2 Islanders. Seen here parked at the ramp at Gustaf III airport on St Barthélemy. Registration: VP-ACT.

=== Historical fleet ===
Anguilla Air Services used to operate the following aircraft:

| Aircraft | Passengers |
|---|---|
| 1 Cessna 402 | 9 |
| 1 Beechcraft King Air 100 | 7 |

== Accidents and incidents ==
On March 13, 2016, an Anguilla Air Services BN-2B-20 Islander (Registered VP-ACT) sustained substantial damage in a runway excursion while landing at St Barth Gustaf III Airport (SBH / TFFJ). The aircraft was on approach to runway 28 at St. Barts, and the runway was reported as wet. After touchdown, the pilot lost directional control of the airplane and skidded off the runway somewhere near the other end (runway 10 end). There were no fatalities.
