= V. C. Bird International Airport =

Airport on the island of Antigua, Antigua and Barbuda

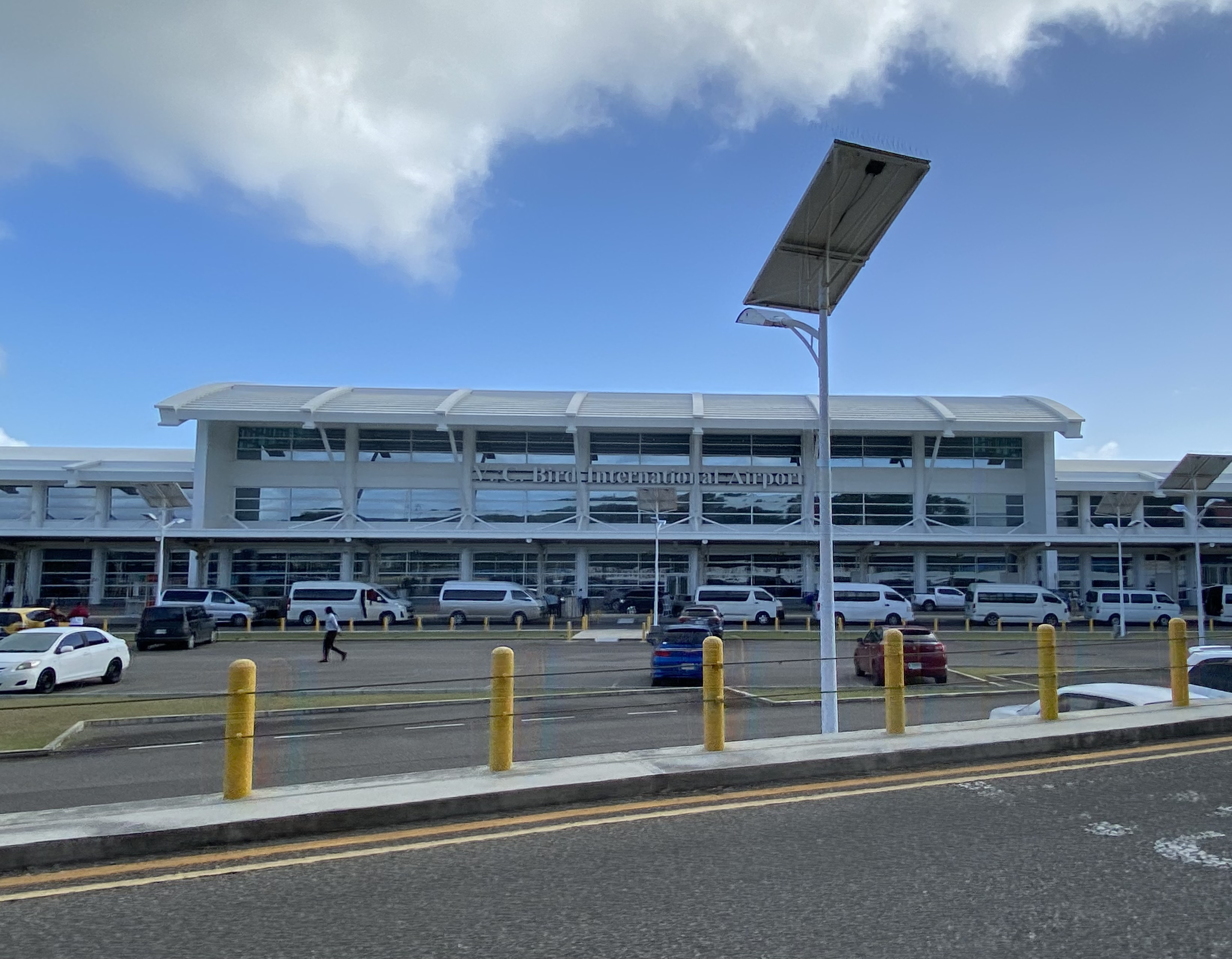
- IATA: ANU; ICAO: TAPA

Summary
- Airport type: Public
- Operator: Antigua and Barbuda Airport Authority
- Serves: St. John's, Antigua and Barbuda
- Location: Osbourn, Antigua and Barbuda
- Hub for: BMN Air; FlyMontserrat; LIAT20; Sunrise Airways
- Elevation AMSL: 62 ft (19 m)
- Coordinates: 17°08′12″N 061°47′35″W
- Website: http://vcbia.com

Map
- Location in Antigua ANU (the Caribbean)

Runways
Direction	Length		Surface
Direction	m	ft	Surface
07/25	3,038	9,967	Asphalt

Statistics (2018)
- Passengers: 981,159
- Passenger change 17-18: NA
- Aircraft movements: 38,305
- Movements change 17-18: NA
- Source: DAFIF, 2009 World Airport Traffic Report.

V. C. Bird International Airport (IATA: ANU, ICAO: TAPA) is an international airport located on the island of Antigua, 8 km (5.0 mi) northeast of St. John's, the largest city of Antigua and Barbuda. It is the centre of aviation in the country and is the larger of its two international airports. When it was opened, Terminal A was named by Caribbean Community as the region's most modern airport. Terminal A was opened in August 2015 after a construction process that began in 2005. The airport serves as a major transport hub for the wider Leeward Islands. It connects the country with four continents and more than fifty destinations.

== History ==
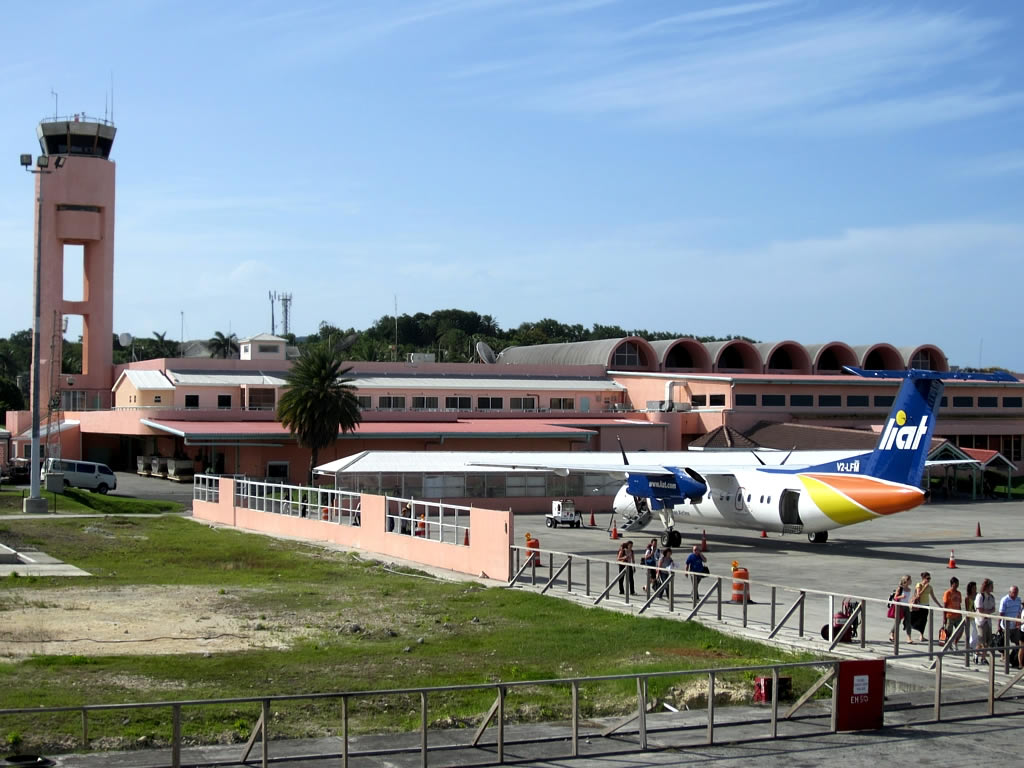
The former main terminal, once used only for offices and general aviation. Later reopened as Terminal B.

The airport originally was operated by the United States Army Air Forces.

The airport was built as a United States Army Air Forces base around 1941 and named Coolidge Airfield after Capt. Hamilton Coolidge (1895–1918), a United States Army Air Service pilot killed in World War I.

Flying units assigned to the airfield were:

- 35th Bombardment Squadron (25th Bombardment Group) 11 November 1941 until November 1942
- 12th Bombardment Squadron (25th Bombardment Group) 23 November 1943 until 24 March 1944
- 4th Tactical Reconnaissance Squadron (Antilles Air Command) 21 May until 5 October 1945

Renamed Coolidge Air Force Base (Coolidge AFB) in 1948, it was closed as a result of budgetary cutbacks in 1949, with the right of re-entry retained by the United States. Agreements were subsequently reached with the United Kingdom and, later, the Antigua government upon independence, for the establishment and maintenance of missile tracking facilities. Antigua Air Station was established on a portion of the former Coolidge AFB. NASA utilized the Antigua facility for launch tracking services on an as-needed basis; and did so for the launch of the Mars Science Laboratory on 26 November 2011. The air station was closed in July 2015 and there are currently no foreign military bases in the country.

Upon the closure of the base in 1949, it became a civil airport. It was known as Coolidge International Airport until 1985 when it was named in honour of Sir Vere Cornwall Bird (1909–1999), the first prime minister of Antigua and Barbuda.

In December 2005, the Antigua and Barbuda Millennium Airport Corporation announced it would invite tenders to construct the first phase of a new passenger terminal designed to serve the airport for 30 years. In 2012, they announced the construction of its second terminal.

The new terminal became operational on 26 August 2015. All flights operate from the new facility. The terminal covers 23,000 square meters (247,570 square feet), with four jet bridges, modern security screening facilities, up-to-date passenger processing and monitoring facilities, and a CCTV security system. It contains 46 check-in counters, 15 self-check-in kiosks, 5 baggage carousels, a mini food court, multiple VIP lounges, a bank, retail stores, first-class lounges, restaurants, and other facilities. Other improvements included a newly constructed car park; parallel to the old terminal, along with other airport offices. The airport was named by CARICOM as the region's most modern at the time of its opening. It is one of the largest in the Leeward Islands and serves as a major transportation hub.

In May 2025 it was announced that the old terminal would be renovated to support cruise home-porting operations at the harbour in St. John's. The old terminal is currently undergoing renovation and has been renamed to Terminal B. A ground transportation hub opened at Terminal B in February 2026. As of 2026, the airport links the country to more than 50 destinations.

== Airlines and destinations ==
=== Passenger ===
Airlines	Destinations
Air Canada Rouge	Toronto–Pearson
Air Peace	Charter: Lagos
American Airlines	Miami, New York–JFK; Seasonal: Charlotte
Anguilla Air Services	Anguilla
BMN Air	Barbuda, Montserrat
British Airways	London–Gatwick
Caribbean Airlines	Barbados, Kingston–Norman Manley, Port of Spain
Condor	Seasonal: Frankfurt
Delta Air Lines	Atlanta
FlyMontserrat	Montserrat
InterCaribbean Airways	Barbados, Providenciales
Liat Air	Barbuda, Barbados, Cartagena de Indias, Castries, Dominica–Douglas-Charles, Georgetown–Cheddi Jagan, Grenada, Kingston–Norman Manley, Montego Bay, Pointe-à-Pitre, Port of Spain, Punta Cana, Saint Kitts, Saint Vincent–Argyle, Sint Maarten, Tortola
Sky High	Santo Domingo–Las Americas
St Barth Commuter	Saint Barthelemy
Sunrise Airways	Barbados, Castries, Dominica–Douglas-Charles, Fort-de-France, Grenada, Pointe-à-Pitre, Port-au-Prince, Saint Kitts, Saint Vincent–Argyle, Santo Domingo–Las Americas, Sint Maarten, Tortola
SVG Air	Dominica–Canefield
Tradewind Aviation	Anguilla, Saint Barthelemy
United Airlines	Newark
Virgin Atlantic	London–Heathrow
WestJet	Toronto–Pearson
Winair	Dominica–Douglas-Charles, Saint Kitts, Sint Maarten, Tortola

== Ground transportation ==
Taxis and rental cars are available at the airport, although there is no public bus service.

== Other facilities ==
- The Antigua Outstation of the Eastern Caribbean Civil Aviation Authority is on the airport property.
- The airport includes a mural by Heather Doram, designer of Antigua and Barbuda's national costume.

== Statistics ==
Terminal A was opened on 20 August 2015, and has a processing capacity of 1,700 passengers. The airport is open 24 hours a day and is serviced by more than 17 airlines.

== Accidents and incidents ==
- On 7 October 2012, FlyMontserrat Flight 107, a FlyMontserrat Britten-Norman Islander took off and later crashed a few feet off the runway, killing the pilot and 2 of the 3 passengers on board. The accident was due to significant contamination of the aircraft's fuel by water.
