= John A. Osborne Airport =

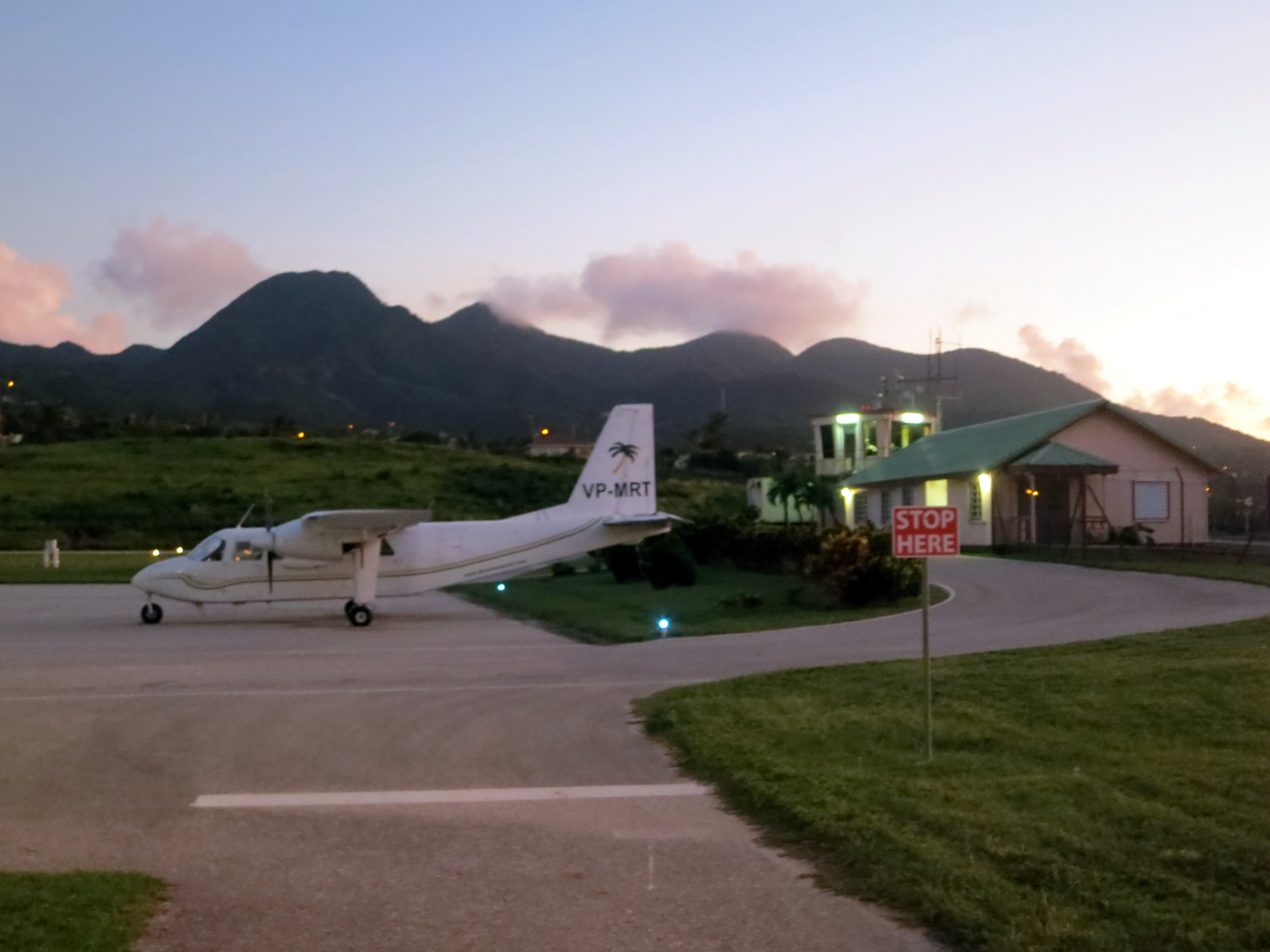
- IATA: MNI; ICAO: TRPG

Summary
- Airport type: Public
- Owner: Government of Montserrat
- Operator: Government of Montserrat
- Serves: Brades
- Location: Montserrat
- Hub for: FlyMontserrat; ABM Air
- Elevation AMSL: 550 ft (170 m)
- Coordinates: 16°47′29″N 062°11′36″W

Map
- Location in Montserrat MNI (the Caribbean)

Runways
Direction	Length		Surface
Direction	m	ft	Surface
10/28	593	1,946	Asphalt
- Source: Eastern Caribbean AIP valid 16 March 2006

John A. Osborne Airport (Gerald's Airport until 2008) (IATA: MNI, ICAO: TRPG) is a small airport located in the village of Gerald's on the island of Montserrat, a British Overseas Territory in the Caribbean Sea. It is the only airport serving the island, offering flights to other larger airports like Princess Juliana International Airport in Sint Maarten.

== History ==
Gerald's passenger terminal was dedicated in February 2005 by Anne, Princess Royal and the facility was formally opened on 11 July 2005. It features a 593 metres (1,946 ft) runway, a restaurant, modern air traffic control technology, and immigration facilities. It is the only airport in the Caribbean with a public tunnel under its runway. The total cost of construction was approximately US$18.5 million.

The completion of John A. Osborne Airport allowed for the resumption of regular commercial airline service to Montserrat for the first time since 1997, when W. H. Bramble Airport, which had been the island's only aviation gateway, was destroyed by an eruption of the nearby Soufrière Hills volcano. Between 1997 and 2005, Montserrat had been accessible only by helicopters, boats and seaplanes.

The airport's name was changed in July 2008 to honour John Osborne (1935–2011), long-standing Chief Minister of Montserrat.

The airline FlyMontserrat has its headquarters on the airport property.

== Airlines and destinations ==
Airlines	Destinations
BMN Air	Antigua
FlyMontserrat	Antigua
Winair	Sint Maarten

Montserrat is improving its regional airline connectivity with the introduction of twice weekly scheduled flights to Sint Maarten's Princess Juliana International Airport operated by Winair starting May 9, 2025.

== See also ==
- List of shortest runways
- Video of FlyMontserrat plane landing in Montserrat
