= Heritage Quay =

Heritage Quay may refer to:

- Heritage Quay (Antigua), a shopping centre in St. John's, Antigua and Barbuda
- Heritage Quay, the archive collection of the University of Huddersfield, England
