= Fort Barrington, Antigua and Barbuda =

Fort Barrington
- Yeptons, Antigua
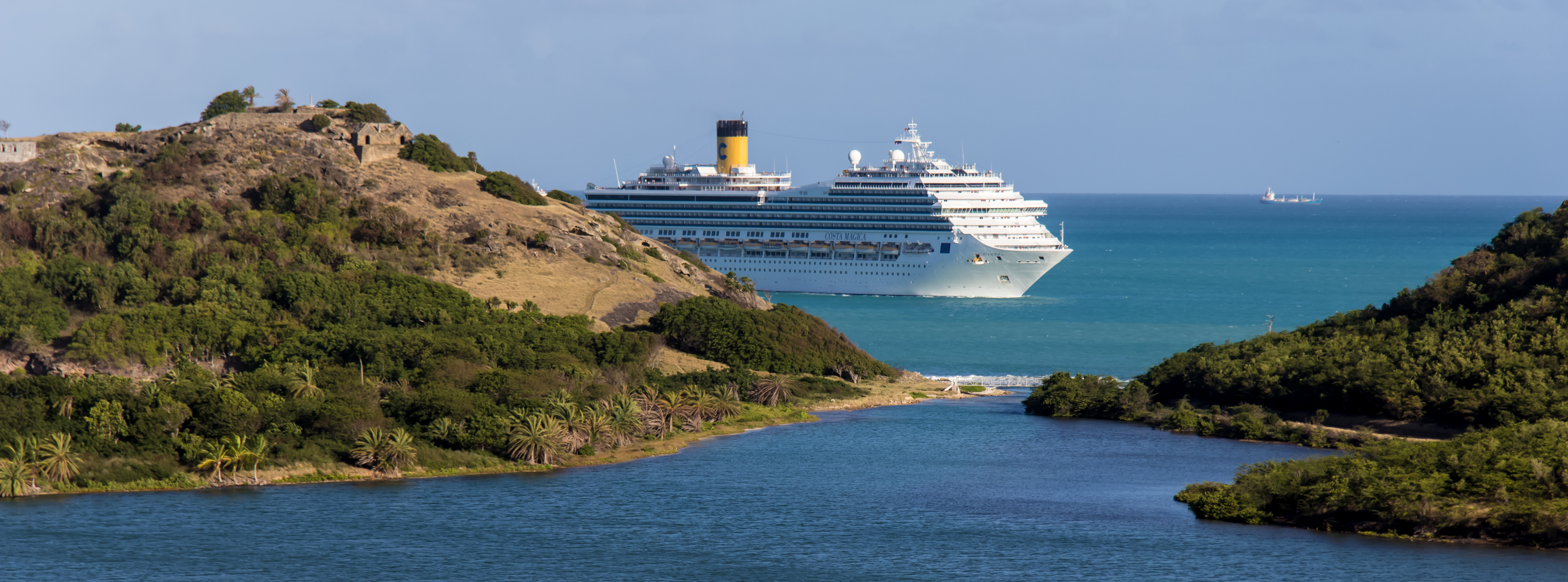
- Remains of Fort Barrington on Goat Hill (left), with cruise ship passing behind it

Site information
- Type: Fortification
- Open to the public: Yes
- Condition: Ruins

Location
- Location within Antigua
- Location within Antigua Location within the Caribbean
- Coordinates: 17.129853°N 61.886257°W

Site history
- Built: 1779
- In use: No
- Materials: Stone

Fort Barrington (previously Goat Hill Fort, Cripplegate Battery, and Queen’s Battery) is a historic military fort in Antigua and Barbuda. It is located on Goat Hill in Yeptons, Antigua, at the western entrance to St. John's Harbour. The fort was built in 1779, and was named for Admiral Samuel Barrington. Remains of the fort include a circular battery, small magazine, and barracks.

== History ==
In the 17th century, the British built a battery on Goat Hill in Yeptons. Sitting at the most southwestern point of St. John's Harbour, the battery's location was ideal for protecting the harbor's entrance as well as the anchorage outside the harbor. The battery was attacked multiple times, and in the 18th century it was often described as being in disrepair. It was abandoned after Queen Anne’s War.

In 1779, a new fort was built at the location of the previous battery. Its purpose was to assist Fort James (located at the harbor's opposite entrance) with protecting St. John's Harbour. The fort was completed under the administration of General William Mathew Burt, who was governor of the Leeward Islands from 1776 to 1781. It served as a major fortification for the British during the American Revolutionary War and the War of 1812.

The fort's previous names were Goat Hill Fort, Cripplegate Battery, and Queen’s Battery. It was renamed Fort Barrington for the British royal navy admiral Samuel Barrington. Barrington was commander in chief of the Leeward Islands station during the time of the fort's construction.
