= St. John's, Antigua and Barbuda =

Capital of Antigua and Barbuda

St. John's Sen Jaan
- City
- City of St. John's
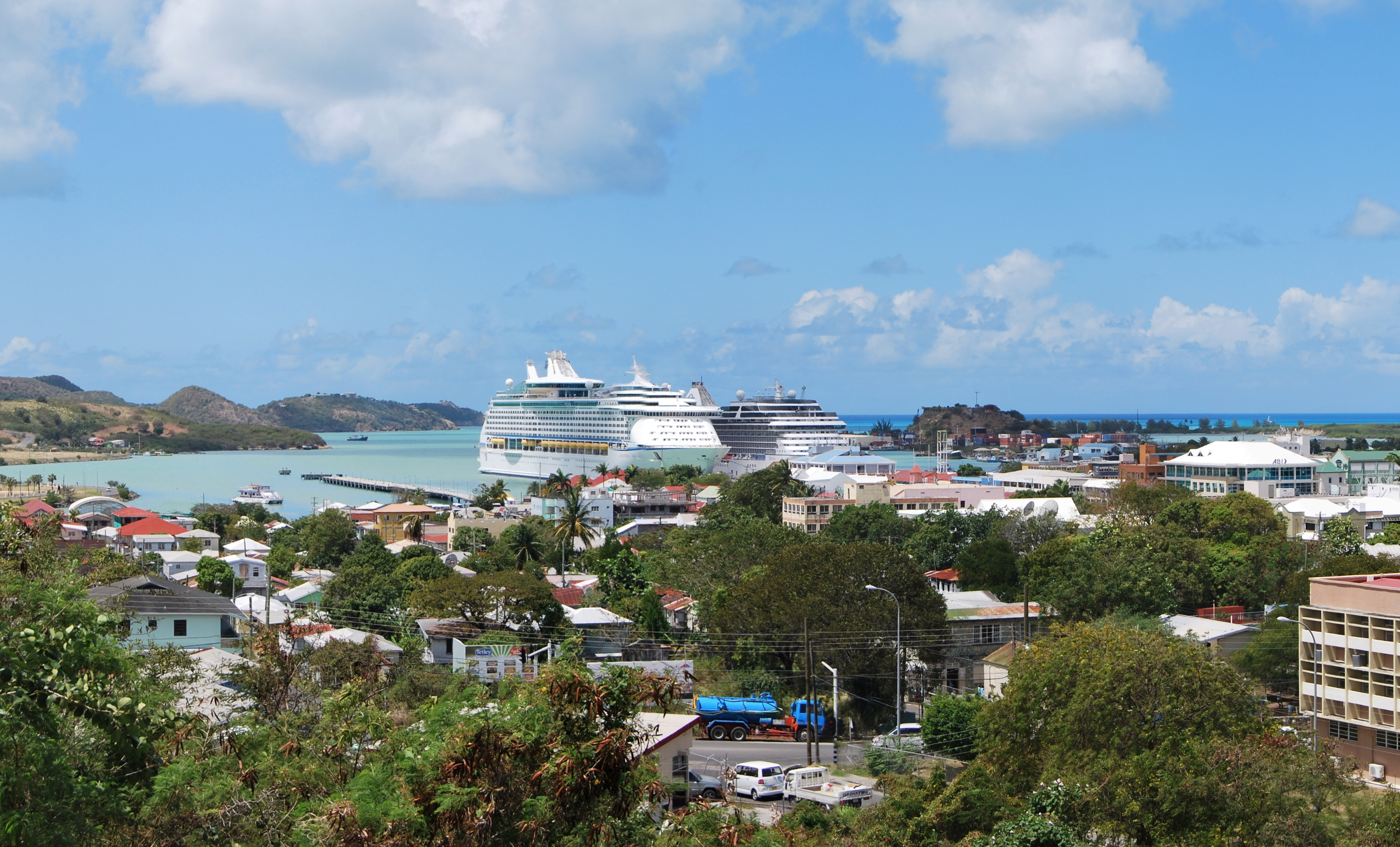
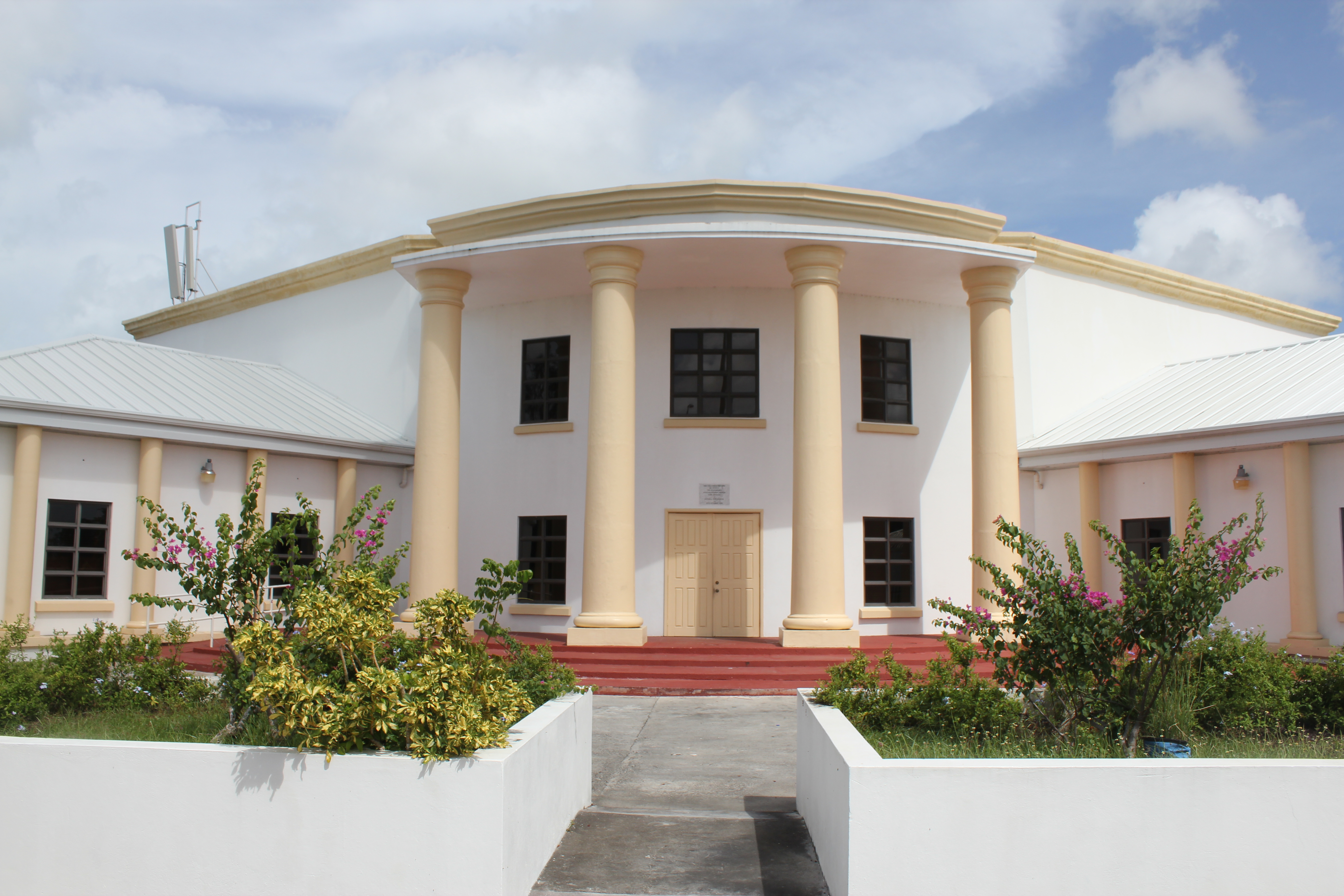
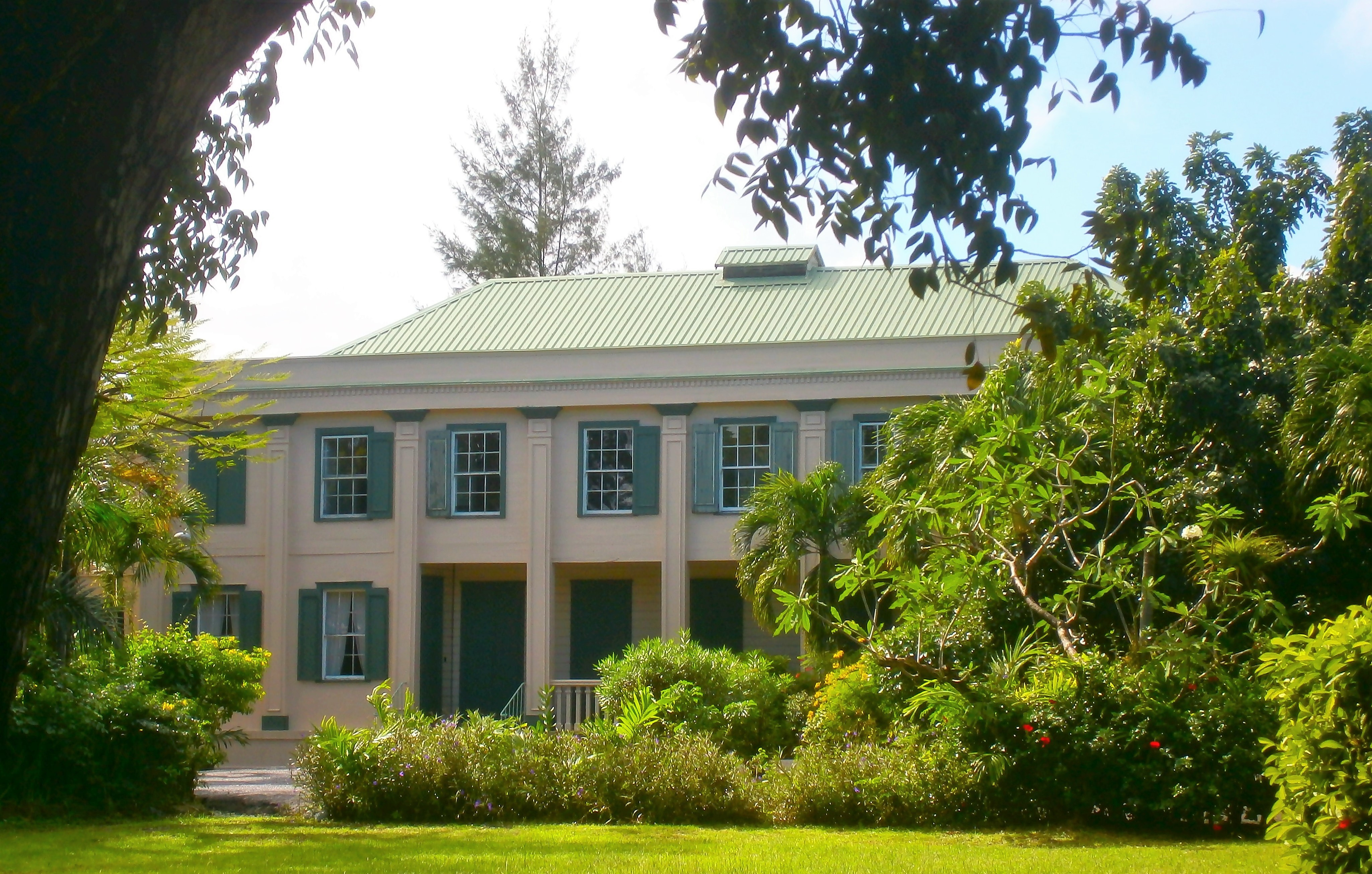
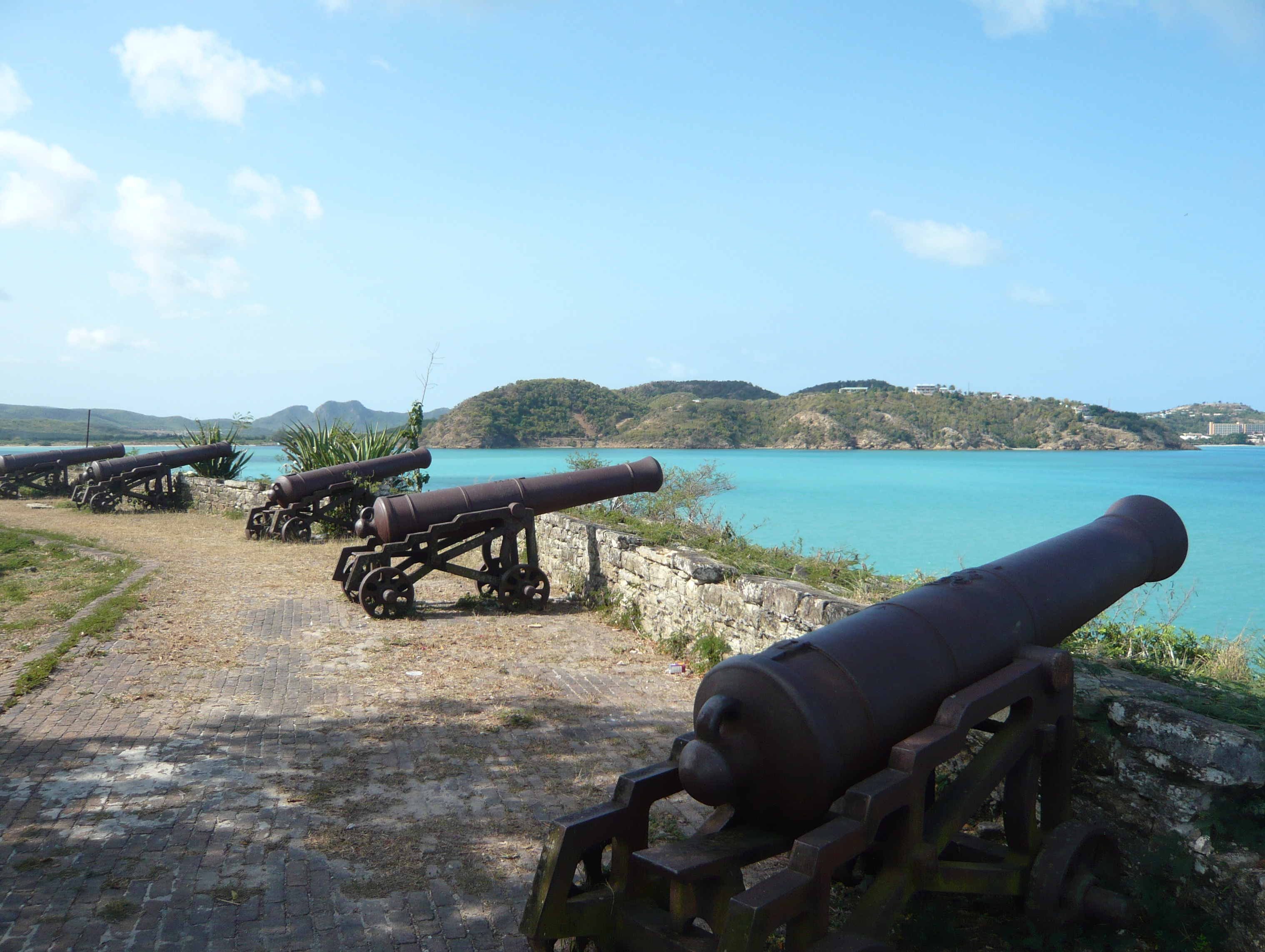
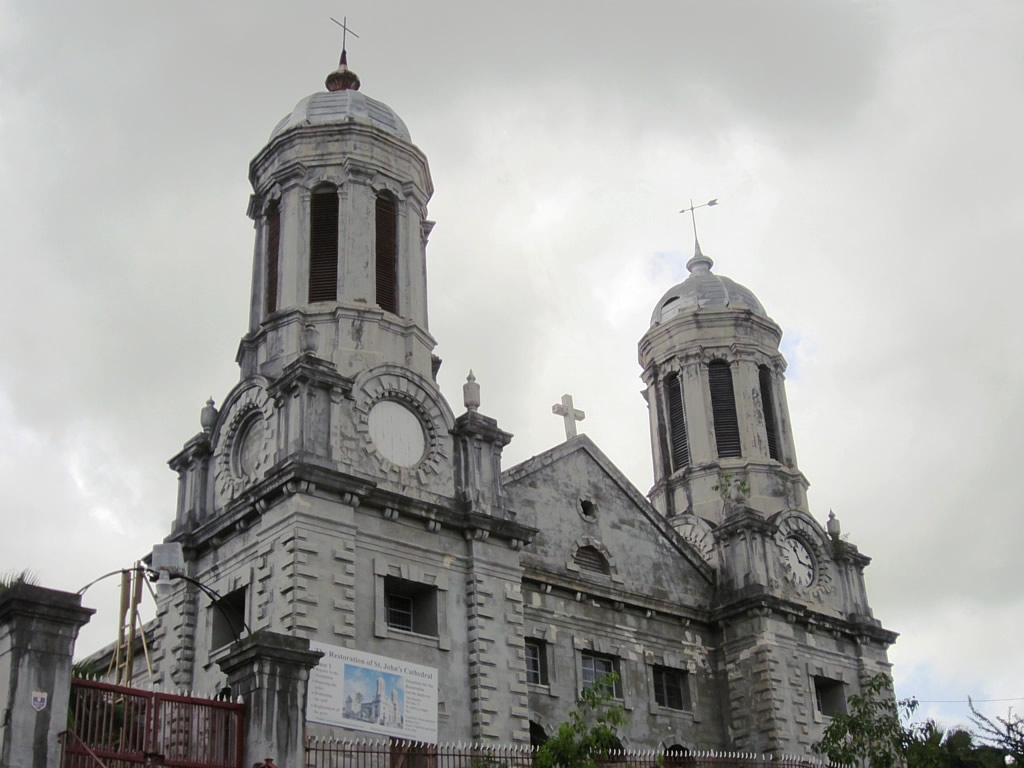
- Top: St. John's skyline; Middle: Parliament Building, Government House; Bottom: Fort James, St. John's Cathedral

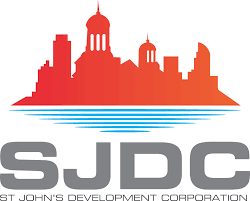
- Seal
- Interactive map of the St. John's City main place
- Location within Antigua and Barbuda Location within North America
- Coordinates: 17°07′38″N 61°50′48″W
- Country: Antigua and Barbuda
- Island: Antigua
- Parish: Saint John

Government
  - Body: St. John's Development Corporation (downtown only)
  - Executive Director: Craig B. Whyte
  - City Manager: Carolyn Thomas-Parker

Area
  - Total: 10 km^{2} (3.9 sq mi)
- Elevation: 0–59 m (0–194 ft)

Population (2011)
  - Total: 22,219
  - Density: 3,100/km^{2} (8,000/sq mi)

Ethnicities
  - African: 84.86%
- Time zone: UTC-04:00 (AST)
- Airport: V.C. Bird International Airport
- Website: sjdcanu.com

St. John's (Antiguan and Barbudan Creole: Sen Jaan) is the largest city in Antigua and Barbuda. It is located in the western part of Antigua, surrounding St. John's Harbour. It is the main city of the Central Plain region. The city is Antigua and Barbuda's primate city, having a population of 22,219. St. John's also dominates the parish of Saint John, which makes up much of the city's metropolitan area. From its establishment after the French invasion in 1666, the city has rapidly grown, eventually replacing Falmouth as the island's dominant city.

After its establishment, St. John's became an official trading point in 1675. By 1689, St. John's had overtaken Falmouth in population. St. John's continued to grow throughout the 1700s, occasionally being impacted by a fire or hurricane. St. John's has largely been spared from armed conflict, although a large-scale slave revolt was planned in the city in 1736.

St. John's is not necessarily a premier tourist destination, as it primarily functions as the country's economic centre. St. John's is home to Antigua State College, the country's largest higher education institution, and an open campus of the University of the West Indies. St. John's is attempting to modernise its economy, being home to many convention centres and contemporary office buildings. St. John's is also home to the national library and most government agencies. St. John's is the origin of the All Saints Road corridor, in which most of the country's population lives. While St. John's completely dominates its metropolitan area, the city's economy has stimulated that of surrounding areas like Piggotts and Cedar Valley. While St. John's houses all three branches of government, no law has declared St. John's the official capital city. Most diplomatic missions are located in the nearby village of Marble Hill.

== History ==
Prior to its establishment, a small group of houses in what is now St. John's lined an area known as "the Cove", now St. John's Harbour. St. John's was laid out following the French invasion of 1666, due to the site's strategic location on St. John's Harbour. An act was passed to build a town on the harbour in April 1668. On 16 September 1675, a sitting of the island’s legislature in Old Road established six places of trade, one of which being St. John’s. This was a significant increase from the traditional two. By 1689, St. John’s was as large as Falmouth. The remainder of the 1600s were largely peaceful, until 7 December 1710. On that date, Daniel Parke was killed after much of his assembly had nearly been expelled from St. John's to Parham. In 1736, a plan by St. John's resident Prince Klaas to turn Antigua into an independent African kingdom was discovered, resulting in his being killed. 132 other co-conspirators were also punished. The plot caused a large scare, and in 1741, barracks were built on Rat Island, and in 1753, in the centre of the town.

In 1768, the city was hit by a major fire. By this time, St. John's was also the seat of government of the British Leeward Islands, a title it maintained until the colony's permanent abolishment in 1959. In 1772 the island was hit by a hurricane, resulting in significant damage to the city's shipping industry. In 1782, the city was again damaged by a fire that occurred in one of the most densely populated parts of the city. In 1784, the city's night watch was established, and citizens of the city were subjected to a tax to pay for it. To prevent another fire, building regulations were also improved, with most public buildings being required to have brick walls and tiled or slate roofs. In 1786, another tax was established due to the prevalence of vermin, reptiles, prickly pear bushes lining the streets. The roads were also not paved at the time, nor were they kept clean. Gaming tables were also outlawed. In 1790, the parish vestry was granted the ability to tax traders, which impacted the city due to it being the parish's economic centre. In the early 1800s, the present-day Government House was built.

During the late 1800s and early 1900s, St. John's once had an elected city council. The council no longer exists, and there is no longer a city-wide local government. In Downtown St. John's, the St. John's Development Corporation continues to handle a degree local government. St. John's is now the country's primate city, being home to around a quarter of its population, and about half of the population of the parish. St. John's was once home to an airstrip in the 1940s at the Old Runway area of Villa, but is now served by V. C. Bird International Airport.

While no law explicitly states St. John's is the country's capital, the city is home to the Government Complex in the Botanical Gardens neighbourhood, which is home to the High Court, the Office of the Prime Minister, and the Parliament Building. The Parliament building was opened in 2006. The Labour Party largely dominates the city's politics, carrying the city in the 2023 election.

== Geography and climate ==
St. John's was laid out on a gentle slope east of St. John's Harbour. The city is bordered by primarily flat land, allowing a large network of roads to converge in the city. Due to this gentle elevation gradient, wastewater runoff is common due to poor planning along with a high concentration of high concentration of clayey loam soil above a high water table. The high water table allows for an easy source of water for the city's wells. The gentle slope also allowed for ease in constructing roads and pedestrian walkways. The coastline of the city is prone to flooding due to its low elevation.

Nearby villages and settlements include St. Johnston. McKinnon's Pond is located just north of St. John's. Areas are the second-level administrative divisions of Antigua and Barbuda. St. John's was considered a first-level administrative division for the purposes of dividing the areas, and the areas tend to coincide with the neighbourhoods of the city.

St. John's has a Tropical savanna climate (Köppen climate classification: Aw) with summer-like weather year-round, with hot days and warm nights. Rainfall is at its highest during the months of September to November due to hurricane activity. On 12 August 1995, a temperature of 34.9 °C (94.8 °F) was recorded, which was the highest temperature to have ever been recorded in Antigua and Barbuda.

Climate data for St. John's, Antigua and Barbuda (V. C. Bird International Airport)
Month	Jan	Feb	Mar	Apr	May	Jun	Jul	Aug	Sep	Oct	Nov	Dec	Year
Record high °C (°F)	31.2 (88.2)	31.8 (89.2)	32.9 (91.2)	32.7 (90.9)	34.1 (93.4)	32.9 (91.2)	33.5 (92.3)	34.9 (94.8)	34.3 (93.7)	34.1 (93.4)	32.6 (90.7)	31.5 (88.7)	34.9 (94.8)
Mean daily maximum °C (°F)	28.3 (82.9)	28.4 (83.1)	28.8 (83.8)	29.4 (84.9)	30.2 (86.4)	30.6 (87.1)	30.9 (87.6)	31.2 (88.2)	31.1 (88.0)	30.6 (87.1)	29.8 (85.6)	28.8 (83.8)	29.8 (85.6)
Daily mean °C (°F)	25.4 (77.7)	25.2 (77.4)	25.6 (78.1)	26.3 (79.3)	27.2 (81.0)	27.9 (82.2)	28.2 (82.8)	28.3 (82.9)	28.1 (82.6)	27.5 (81.5)	26.8 (80.2)	25.9 (78.6)	26.9 (80.4)
Mean daily minimum °C (°F)	22.4 (72.3)	22.2 (72.0)	22.7 (72.9)	23.4 (74.1)	24.5 (76.1)	25.3 (77.5)	25.3 (77.5)	25.5 (77.9)	25.0 (77.0)	24.4 (75.9)	23.9 (75.0)	23.0 (73.4)	24.0 (75.2)
Record low °C (°F)	15.5 (59.9)	16.6 (61.9)	17.0 (62.6)	16.6 (61.9)	17.8 (64.0)	19.7 (67.5)	20.6 (69.1)	19.3 (66.7)	20.0 (68.0)	20.0 (68.0)	17.7 (63.9)	16.1 (61.0)	15.5 (59.9)
Average precipitation mm (inches)	56.6 (2.23)	44.9 (1.77)	46.0 (1.81)	72.0 (2.83)	89.6 (3.53)	62.0 (2.44)	86.5 (3.41)	99.4 (3.91)	131.6 (5.18)	142.2 (5.60)	135.1 (5.32)	83.4 (3.28)	1,049.2 (41.31)
Average precipitation days (≥ 1.0 mm)	11.1	8.7	7.3	7.2	8.6	8.3	11.8	12.7	12.0	12.9	12.4	12.1	124.7
Source: Antigua/Barbuda Meteorological Services

== Demographics ==
The majority of the population of St. John's reflects that of the rest of Antigua: people of African and mixed European-African ancestry, with a European minority, including British and Portuguese. There is a population of Levantine Christian Arabs. St. John's is among the most impoverished locations in the country. This is due to a large number of immigrants from abroad, and many people from rural areas looking for work. Despite this influx, the population of the city has been declining for a few decades.

== Economy ==
St. John's is one of the most developed and cosmopolitan municipalities in the Lesser Antilles. The city is famous for its shopping malls as well as boutiques throughout the city, selling designer jewellery and haute-couture clothing. St. John's attracts tourists from the resorts on the island and from the cruise ships which dock in its harbour at Heritage Quay and Redcliffe Quay several times a week. These two quays are where the city's tourist activity is centred, with Redcliffe Quay having a good historic reputation, and Heritage Quay being significantly more modern and crowded. Botanical Gardens is the headquarters of the government of Antigua and Barbuda and the largest park area in the city. The investment banking industry has a strong presence in the city. Major world financial institutions have offices in St. John's. There is a market on the southwestern edge of the city where fresh produce, meats, and fresh fish are sold daily. The Antigua Rum Distillery is located at the Citadel and is the only rum distillery on the island.

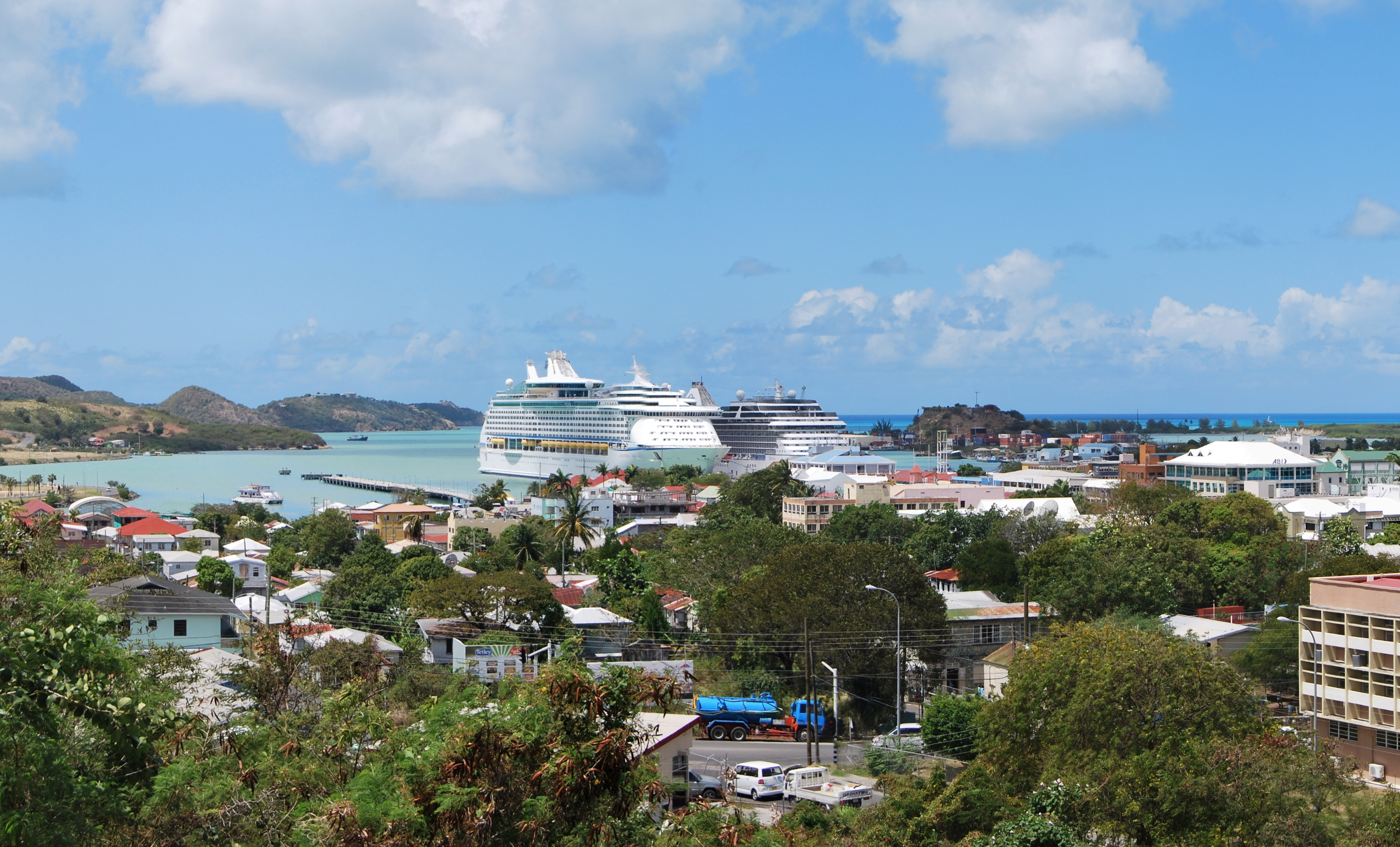
Downtown St. John's

== Government ==
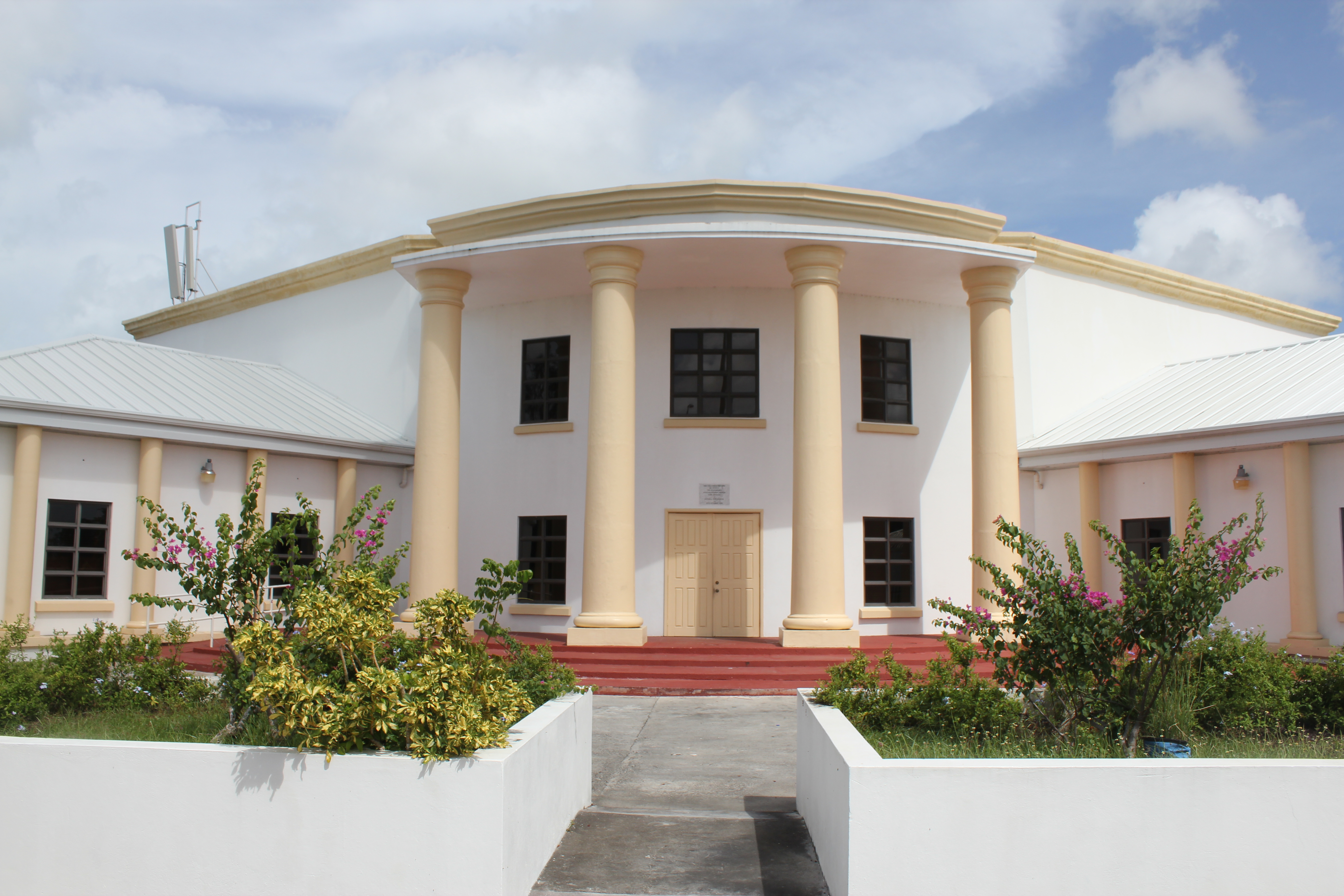
Antigua and Barbuda Parliament Building

St John's is the home of the Parliament of Antigua and Barbuda. St John's is the capital of the Parish of Saint John.

The Eastern Caribbean Civil Aviation Authority has its headquarters on Factory Road in St. John's.

St John's is twinned with Waltham Forest borough in London, England.

The current Executive Director of the city centre is Craig B. Whyte, while the current City Manager is Carolyn Thomas-Parker.

== Culture ==
There are several museums, including the Museum of Antigua and Barbuda and the Museum of Marine Art, a small facility containing fossilised bedrock, volcanic stones, petrified wood, a collection of more than 10,000 shells, and artefacts from English shipwrecks.

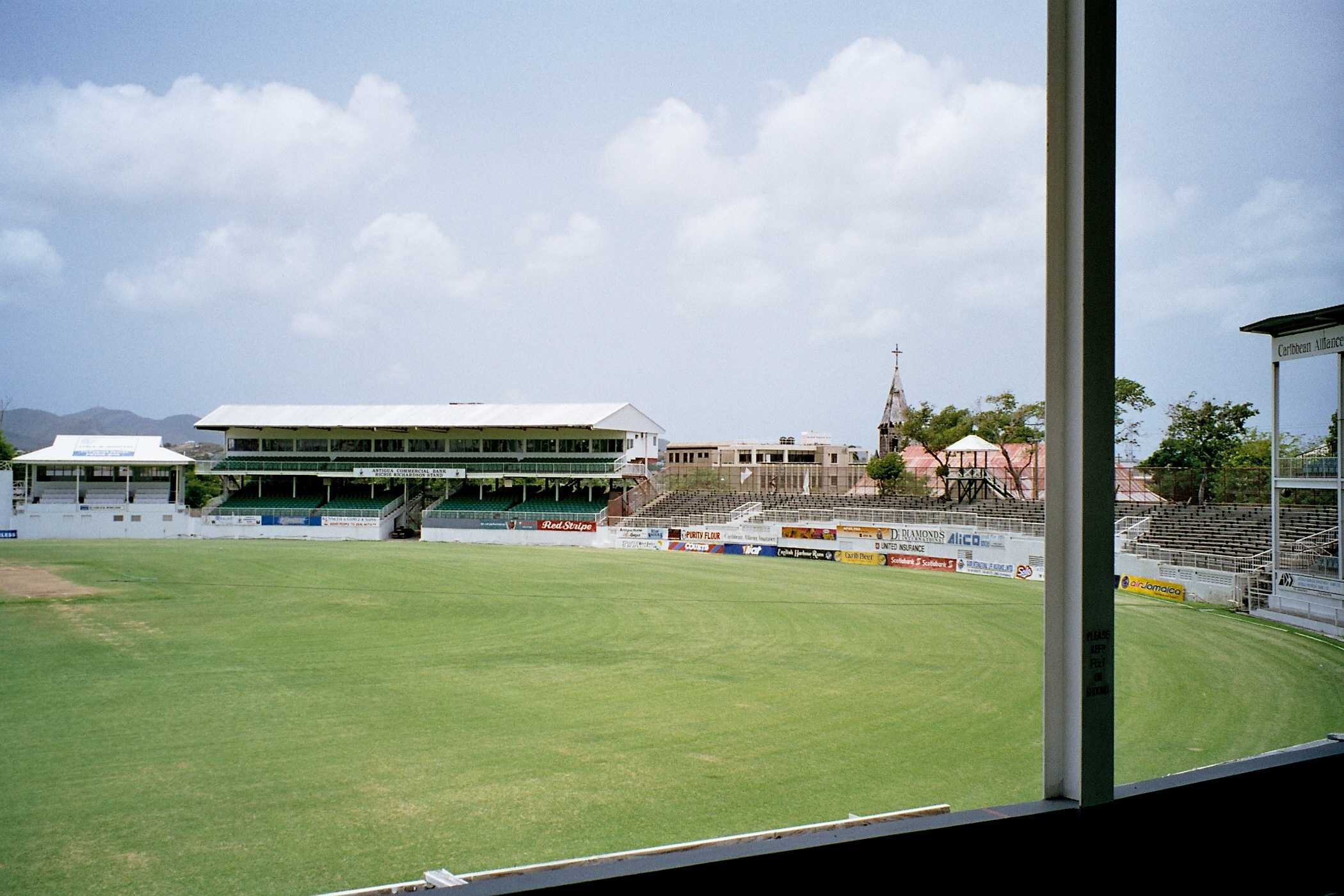
Antigua Recreation Ground

Just east of St. John's is the Sir Vivian Richards Stadium, a multi-use stadium in North Sound, that was created mostly for cricket matches, and has hosted the matches during the 2007 Cricket World Cup. The Antigua Recreation Ground, Antigua and Barbuda's national stadium, is located in St. John's. The city's skyline is dominated by the white baroque towers of St. John's Cathedral.

The Botanical Garden is near the intersection of Factory Road and Independence Avenue. This small park's shaded benches and gazebo provide a quiet refuge from the bustle of activity of St. John's.

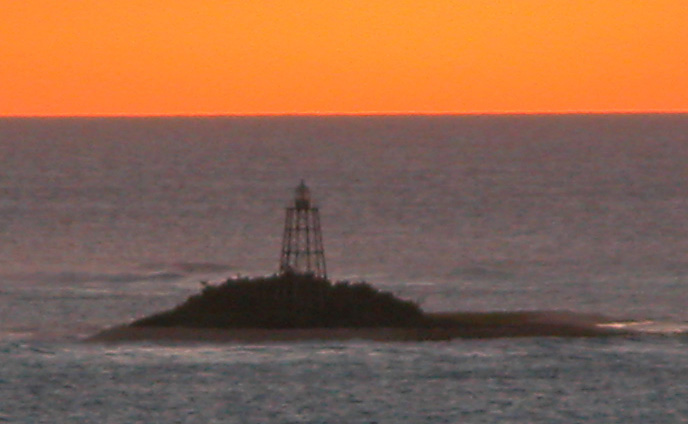
Sandy Island Light

Sandy Island is a lighthouse located on a small island about 5 km off the coast leading the way to St. John's harbour.

Fort James stands at the entrance to St. John's harbour, across from Fort Barrington. Other fortifications on the island include Fort Berkeley, Fort George, Fort Charles, and Fort Shirley (Shirley Heights).

Government House is the governor's residence, originally a 19th-century parsonage building. It is included on the World Monuments Fund's 2018 list of monuments at risk, following exposure to severe weather events.

== Education ==
St. John's is home to two medical schools – the American University of Antigua and University of Health Sciences Antigua. Secondary schools include Christ the King High School, Princess Margaret School and the Antigua Girls High School. Private grade schools include St. John's Lutheran School of the WELS

== Transportation ==
St. John's is served by the V. C. Bird International Airport.

Fort Road Heliport is located in the city, on Fort Road.
