= Deepwater Harbour =

Deepwater Harbour may refer to:

- Port of Bridgetown, a port in Barbados
- St. John's Harbour, a port in Antigua

- List of deepest natural harbours
