= Downtown St. John's, Antigua and Barbuda =

Downtown St. John's
- Neighbourhood
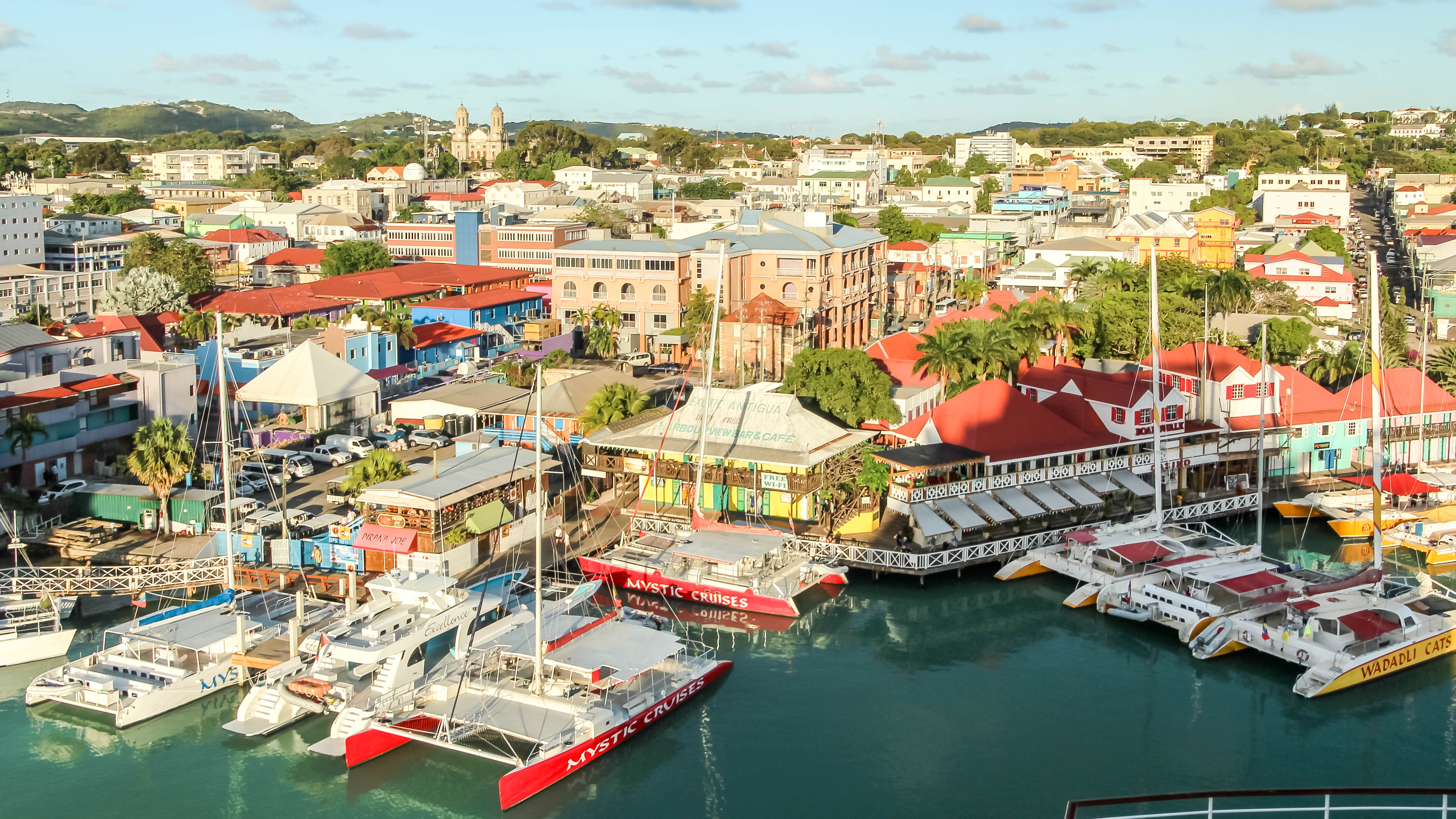
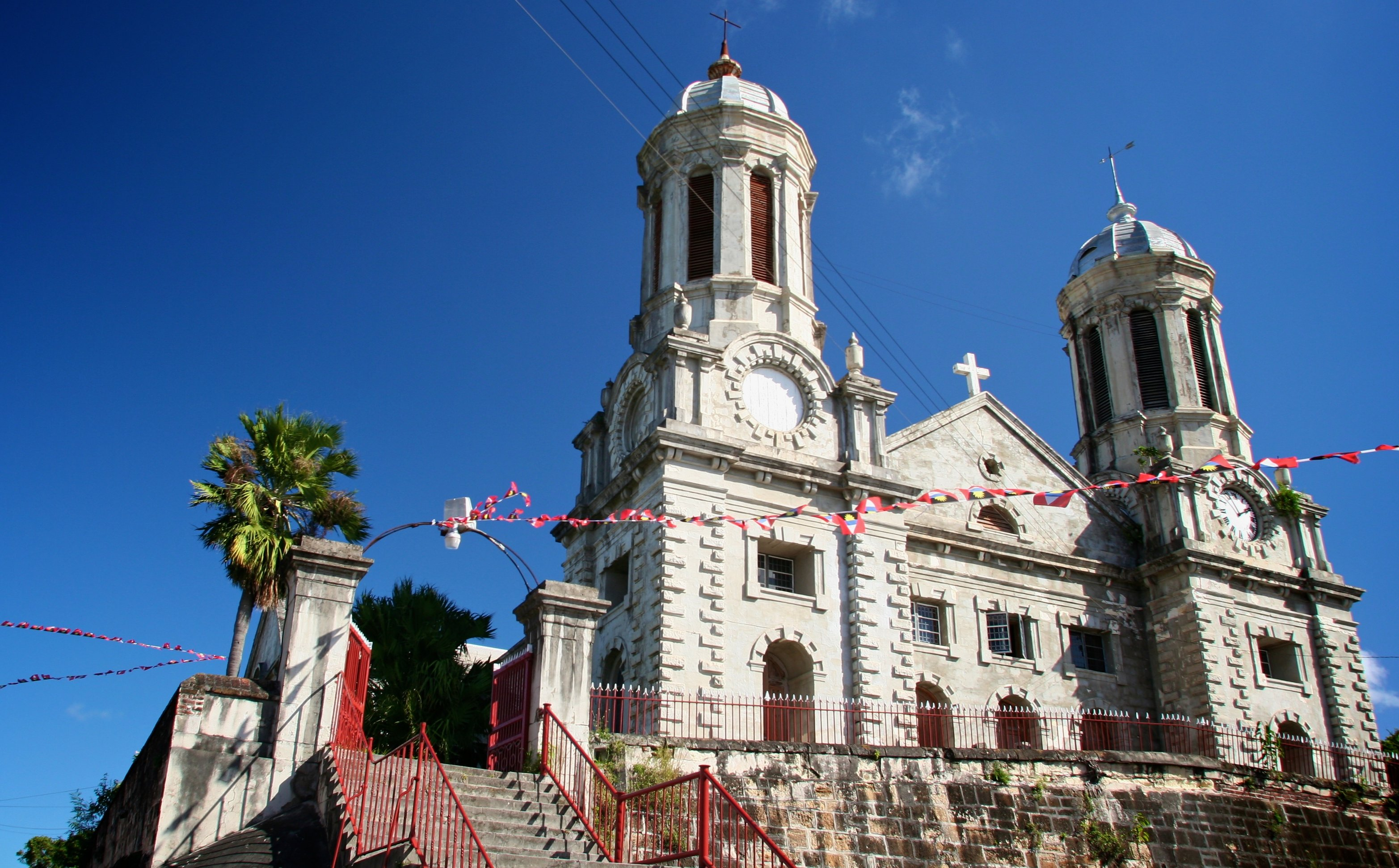
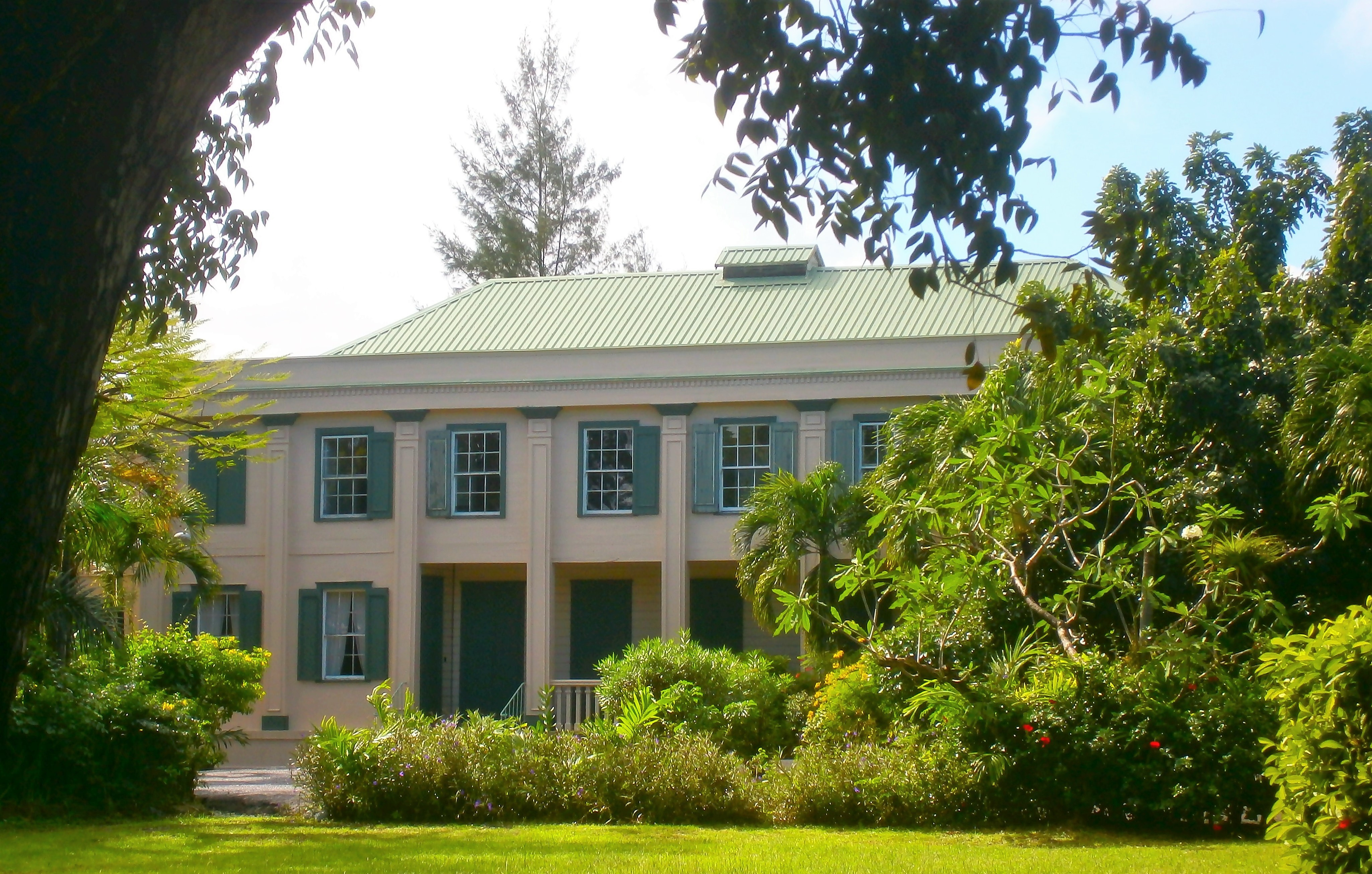
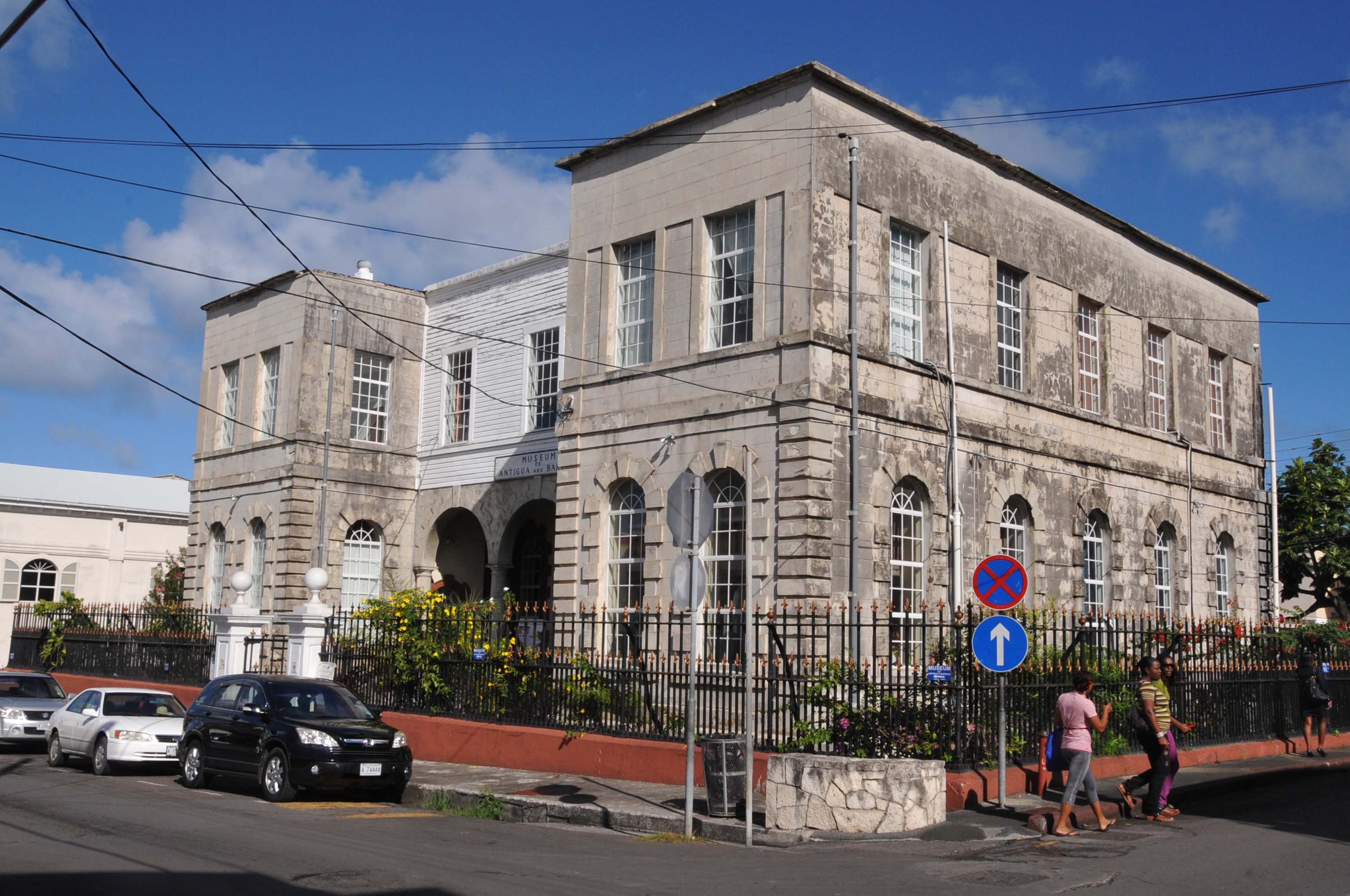
- (from top: left to right) Skyline in 2025, St. John's Cathedral, Government House, Museum of Antigua and Barbuda
- Country: Antigua and Barbuda
- Island: Antigua
- Parish: Saint John
- City: St. John's

Population (2011)
  - Total: 33
- Time zone: UTC-4 (AST)

Downtown St. John's is a neighbourhood in St. John's, Antigua and Barbuda. The area is home to St. John's Harbour. Notable locations include St. John's Cathedral, Redcliffe Quay, and Heritage Quay.

The area is the only part of the city overseen by the St. John's Development Corporation, which provides some local government functions.

== Demographics ==
In 2011, the population was counted in one enumeration district, City Centre Downtown (15300). The neighbourhood had a permanent population of 33 in 2011. In terms of ethnicity, there were African descendants (54.84%), other mixed (32.26%), unknown (6.45%), Syrian and Lebanese (3.23%), and East Indians (3.23%). The largest religious denominations in the district were Anglicans (35.48%) and Methodists (16.13%)– most of the population were Protestant Christians. The area had slightly more immigrants than the national average, with country of birth locations including Antigua and Barbuda (61.29%), Guyana (19.35%), and some unspecified Caribbean countries (6.45%). 83.87% were Antiguan and Barbudan citizens. Seven dual citizens lived in the district.
