= Redcliffe Quay =

Shopping area in Antigua and Barbuda

Coordinates: 17°07′11.93″N 61°50′43.87″W

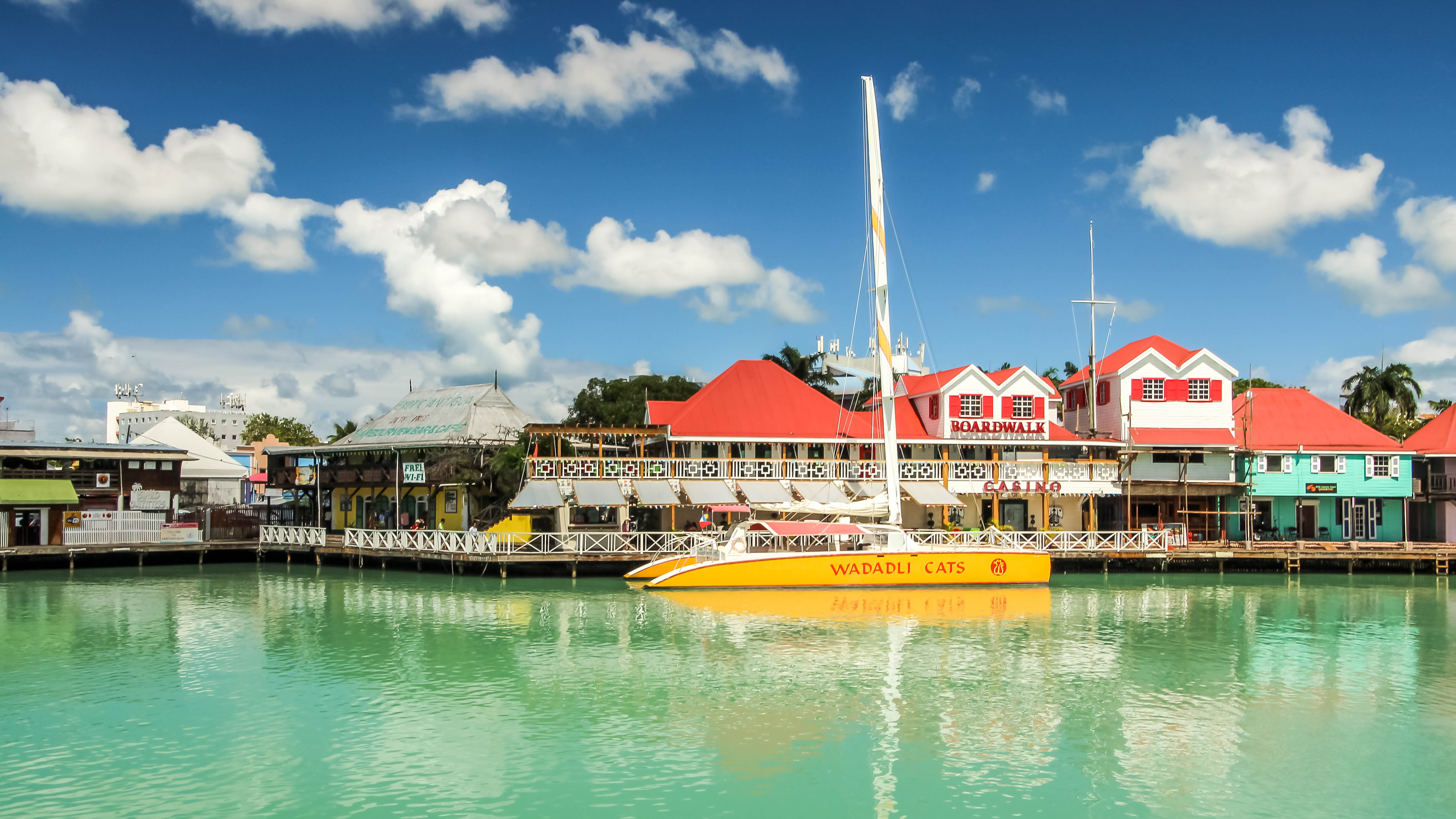
Redcliffe Quay boardwalk in March 2025

Redcliffe Quay (/kiː/) is a shopping area connected to the Antigua Cruise Port in Downtown St. John's. One of two major tourism centres in the district along with Heritage Quay, the area was originally a slave compound until emancipation in 1834. In the seventeenth and eighteenth centuries, this was a busy waterfront and the main trading point of slaves in the colony. It was also the colony's main transit point for rum, sugar, and coffee.

The quay contains tropical gardens, restaurants, cafes, boutiques, and other facilities. Most of the buildings in the area date to these times, and a major refurbishment was done in the 1980s.

It is a duty-free shopping area and the largest collection of historical buildings in the city.

The quay is the primary centre of art in Antigua and Barbuda, home to several galleries and artisans.
