= Yeptons =

- Village
- Yeptons from Fort Barrington, 2026
- Interactive map of the Yeptons main place
- Location within Antigua and Barbuda
- Country: Antigua and Barbuda
- Island: Antigua
- Civil parish: Saint John Parish

Government
  - Type: Village Council (possibly dissolved)

Area
  - Total: 4.83 km^{2} (1.86 sq mi)

Population (2011)
  - Total: 314
  - Density: 65/km^{2} (170/sq mi)
- Time zone: UTC-4 (AST)

Yeptons is a settlement in Saint John, Antigua and Barbuda. It is north of Five Islands.

== Etymology ==
Yepton's Estates name is thought to have come from the Sussex, England, town of Yapton, which lies close to the city of Arundel. Yapton-born Sir George Thomas acquired ownership of the plantation around 1800.

== History ==
=== Yepton's Estate ===
George Thomas, the Leeward Islands' governor from 1753 to 1766, was granted the Thomas Baronetcy of Yapton in the County of Sussex in 1790. After the seventh Baronet, a well-known chess player, died in 1972, the title was abolished. The same was granted to Thomas Edwards and his heirs in fee simple of the plantation therein mentioned for the sum of 22,000 pounds to be paid as follows in 1802, according to an indenture between Sir George Thomas and his son. When George White-Thomas inherited Yapton from his grandfather, Sir George Thomas (d. 1821), he adopted the name Thomas, and Yapton now serves as his memorial cemetery.

Messrs. Hyndman, who owned Yapton in 1829, also owned a number of other estates on Antigua, including Bendalls (#37), 503 acres, Towerhill, 361 acres, Belevedere, 343 acres, Yapton Farm, 888 acres, Mathew's or Constitution Hill (#132), 158 acres, Elmes, and Sawcolt's, all of which were owned by Warrick P. Hyndman in 1852.

Yepton's received a legacy payment of £1,681. 4s. 1p. for freeing 113 slaves when slavery was outlawed by the British Parliament in 1833. Boyd Alexander, Claude Neilson, and William Maxwell Alexander received the honor. Robert Hyndman was unsuccessful, and the Honorable William Fraser was involved.

Alex Coltart, owner of Harney & Coltart, a company that minted farthing coins—a quarter of a penny in British currency—for the collecting of salt from the surrounding salt ponds, was the apparent owner of Yepton's in the 1850s (although he is officially documented as gaining possession in 1878). The only supply of salt today is in Barbuda, where it is harvested during the dry months and kept in sizable barrels for local consumption. As was previously mentioned, various ponds in Antigua once produced salt that was harvested in baskets.

The Yepton's pond behind Deep Bay was a valuable supply of salt in the mid-1800s and well into the early 1900s. It was a coarse-grained kind that was perfect for creating ice cream or salting fresh dishes. A short passage at the northern end of the pond was used to bring sea water, and it was kept from draining during the hot, dry months so that the sun's rays could evaporate the sea water, leaving behind a layer of salt crystals. Village ladies from Five Islands and neighboring villages would gather the salt at the conclusion of the drying season. For each basket of salt they delivered, Harney & Coltart paid them with farthings. These tiny coins are occasionally discovered and brought to the Antigua & Barbuda Museum.

== Demographics ==
Yepton's has one enumeration district, ED 36100 (Yepton's).

Yepton's had a Living Conditions Index of 18.2 in August 2007, among the highest in the country.

Historically, Yepton's has had a population of 114 in 2001, and 122 in 1991.

=== Census data (2011) ===
Ethnic Data for Yepton's
Q48 Ethnic	Counts	%
African descendent	178	56.69%
Caucasian/White	4	1.41%
East Indian/India	1	0.35%
Mixed (Black/White)	8	2.46%
Mixed (Other)	27	8.45%
Hispanic	2	0.70%
Other	1	0.35%
Don't know/Not stated	93	29.58%
Total	314	100.00%

Religion Data for Yepton's
Q49 Religion	Counts	%
Adventist	17	5.43%
Anglican	18	5.80%
Baptist	2	0.72%
Church of God	1	0.36%
Evangelical	3	1.09%
Methodist	8	2.54%
Moravian	54	17.75%
None/no religion	7	2.17%
Pentecostal	32	10.51%
Roman Catholic	18	5.80%
Weslyan Holiness	8	2.54%
Other	19	6.16%
Don't know/Not stated	119	39.13%
Total	305	100.00%
NotApp :	9	

Internet Use Data for Yepton's
Q55 Internet Use	Counts	%
Yes	96	30.63%
No	213	67.96%
Don't know/Not stated	4	1.41%
Total	314	100.00%

Insurance Data for Yepton's
Q53 Insurance	Counts	%
Yes	89	28.52%
No	221	70.42%
Don't know/Not stated	3	1.06%
Total	314	100.00%

Country of birth data for Yepton's
Q58. Country of birth	Counts	%
Africa	2	0.70%
Other Latin or North American countries	2	0.70%
Antigua and Barbuda	152	48.59%
Canada	2	0.70%
Other European countries	1	0.35%
Dominica	9	2.82%
Guyana	14	4.58%
Jamaica	7	2.11%
Monsterrat	1	0.35%
St. Lucia	1	0.35%
St. Vincent and the Grenadines	3	1.06%
Trinidad and Tobago	1	0.35%
United Kingdom	3	1.06%
USA	6	1.76%
Not Stated	108	34.51%
Total	314	100.00%

Country of Citizenship data for Yepton's
Q71 Country of Citizenship 1	Counts	%
Antigua and Barbuda	166	52.82%
Other Caribbean countries	6	1.76%
Canada	1	0.35%
Dominica	3	1.06%
Guyana	12	3.87%
Jamaica	6	1.76%
Monsterrat	1	0.35%
St. Vincent and the Grenadines	2	0.70%
United Kingdom	2	0.70%
USA	3	1.06%
Other countries	3	1.06%
Not Stated	108	34.51%
Total	314	100.00%

Country of second citizenship data for Yepton's
Q71 Country of Citizenship 2 (Country of Second Citizenship)	Counts	%
Canada	6	20.00%
Dominica	4	16.00%
Guyana	3	12.00%
Jamaica	1	4.00%
St. Lucia	2	8.00%
St. Vincent and the Grenadines	1	4.00%
Trinidad and Tobago	1	4.00%
United Kingdom	1	4.00%
USA	6	20.00%
Other countries	2	8.00%
Total	28	100.00%
NotApp :	286	

Business earning data for Yepton's
Q91 Business Earning	Counts	%
Under $1,000 EC per month	2	25.00%
1,000 to $1,999 EC per month	2	25.00%
2,000 to $2,999 EC per month	1	12.50%
3,000 to $4,999 EC per month	2	25.00%
$5,000 EC and over per month	1	12.50%
Total	9	100.00%
NotApp :	298	
Missing :	7	

Employment status data for Yepton's
Employment status	Counts	%
Employed	92	37.90%
Unemployed	6	2.28%
Inactive	142	58.90%
Not stated	2	0.91%
Total	242	100.00%
NotApp :	72	

== Tourist attractions ==
- Yepton, a beach, is located in the village. "A gorgeous and relaxing area being not widely recognized among travelers," is how it is described. There are a few further tiny beaches nearby that are accessible on foot.
