= Heritage Quay (Antigua) =

Shopping area in Antigua and Barbuda

Coordinates: 17°07′16.29″N 61°50′46.38″W

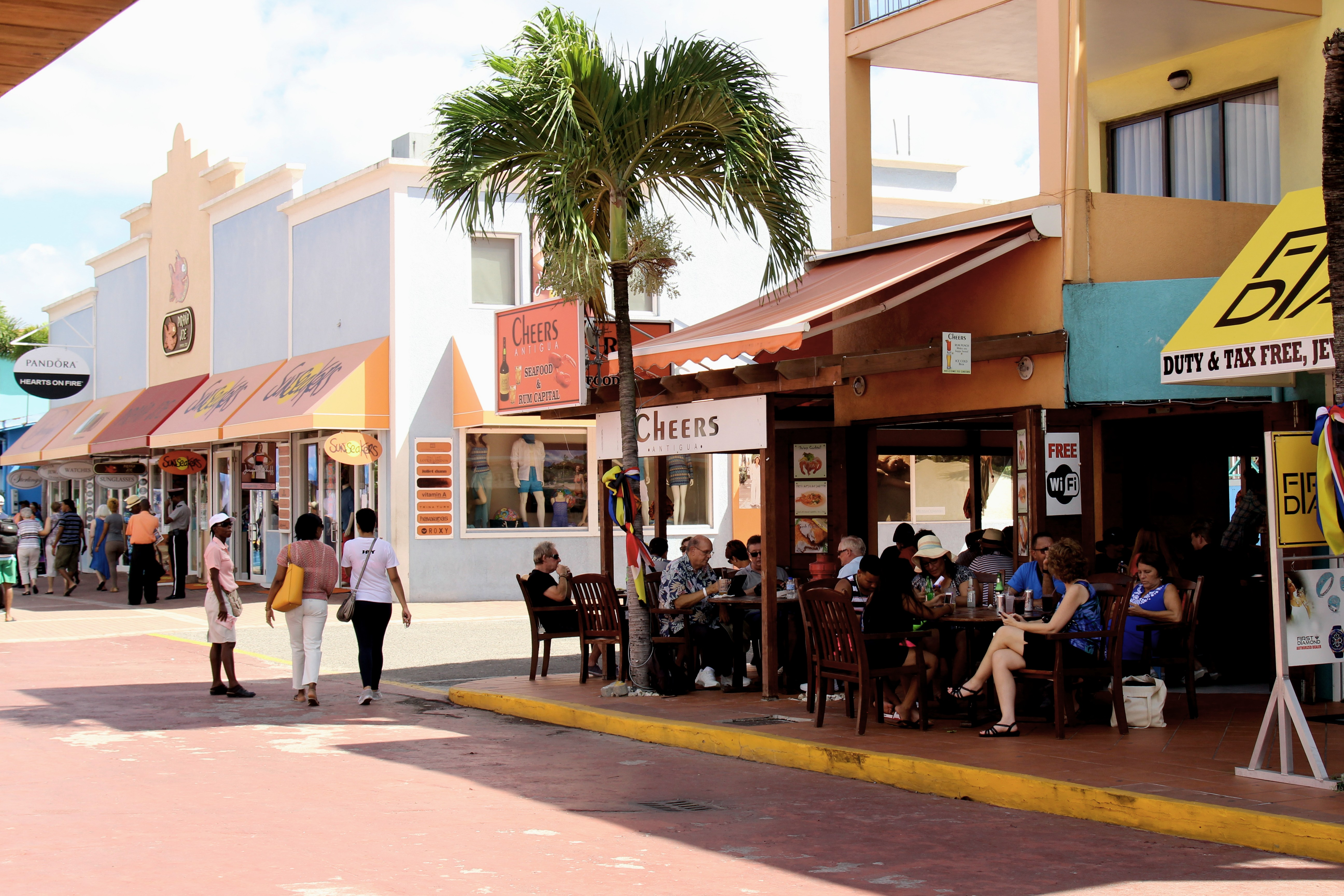
The quay in November 2015

Heritage Quay (/kiː/) is a duty-free shopping area connected to the Antigua Cruise Port. It is the largest shopping centre in Downtown St. John's and both international brands and local businesses have a presence. The area has shopping, entertainment, and music.

The area was officially opened in 1988, intended for cruise passengers. There are about fifty duty-free shops in the complex.

The area is overseen by the St. John's Development Corporation and contains an outpost of the Royal Police Force of Antigua and Barbuda.

It is adjacent to Redcliffe Quay.
