= Fort James, Antigua and Barbuda =

Fort James
- St. John's, Antigua and Barbuda
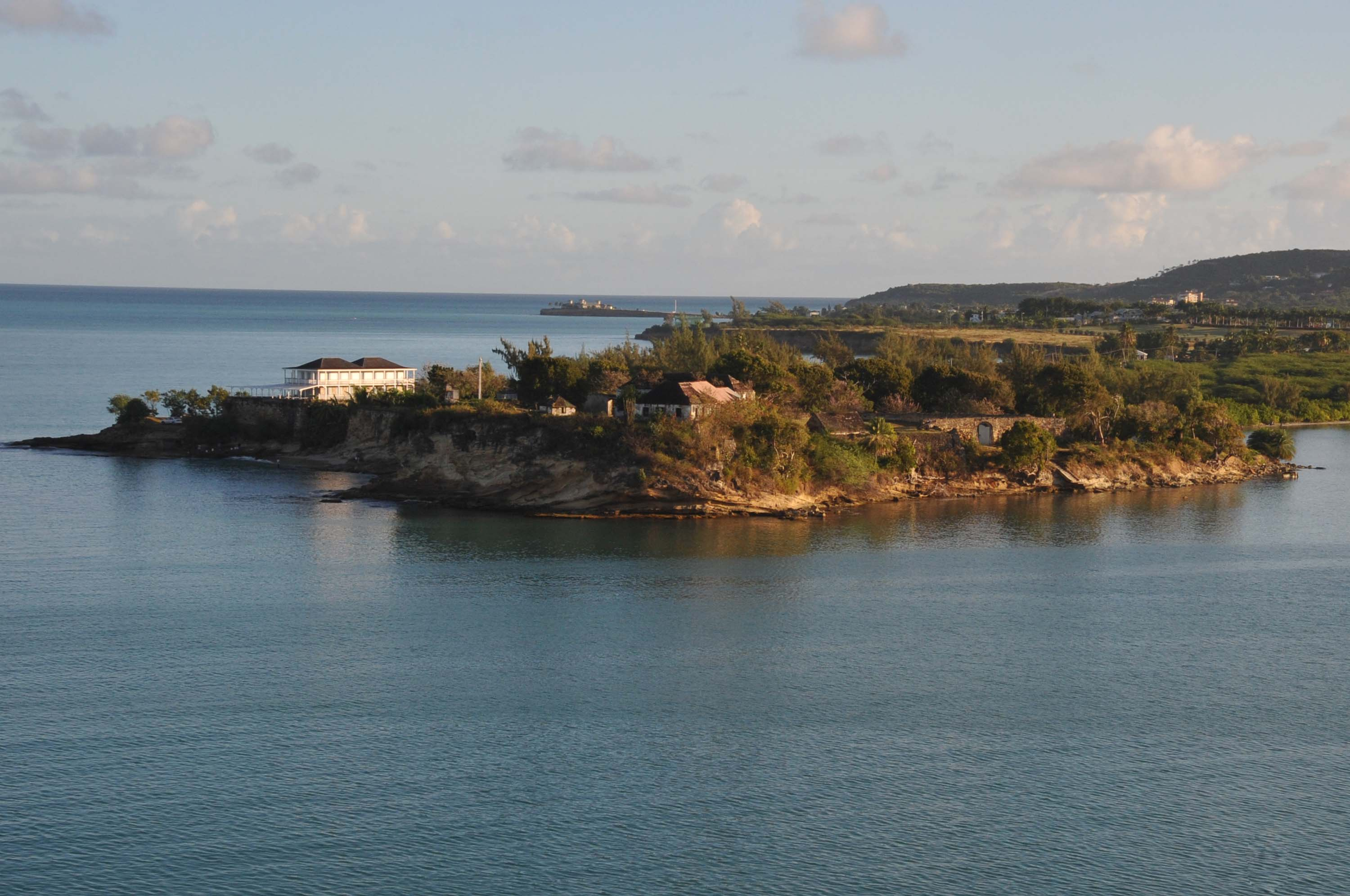
- View of Fort James from the ocean

Site information
- Type: Fort

Location
- Coordinates: 17°07′48.8″N 61°51′49.1″W

Site history
- Built: 1706–1739
- Built by: British Empire

Garrison information
- Current commander: Not applicable it is now a tourist attraction.
- Past commanders: Generally placed under the command of a major.

Fort James is a fort at the entrance to the harbour of St. John's, Antigua and Barbuda. The fort was built to guard St. John's harbour and is one of the many forts built by the British in the 18th century. Fear of a French invasion prompted the construction. It is located on a headland overlooking the town northwesterly. A powder magazine, several cannons and the foundation of the fort's wall remain. The main attraction today is the excellent view of the surrounding harbor.

The fort is named after King James II of England. Work on the fort started in 1706, and most of the buildings were built in 1739. In 1773, the fort was armed with 36 guns, and had a barracks which accommodated 75 men. In the 19th century, a gun fired salutes at visiting warships, as well as signals at sunrise and sunset.

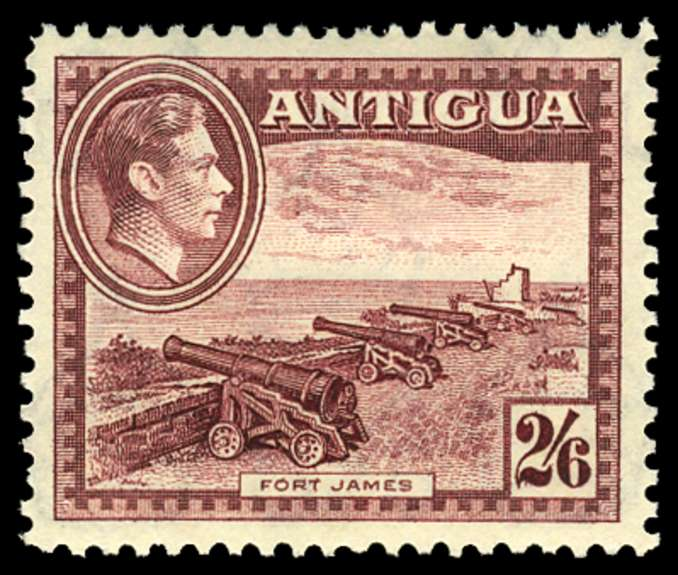
A 1942 stamp of Antigua showing Fort James.
