= St. John's Harbour, Antigua and Barbuda =

Port in Antigua and Barbuda

St. John's Harbour
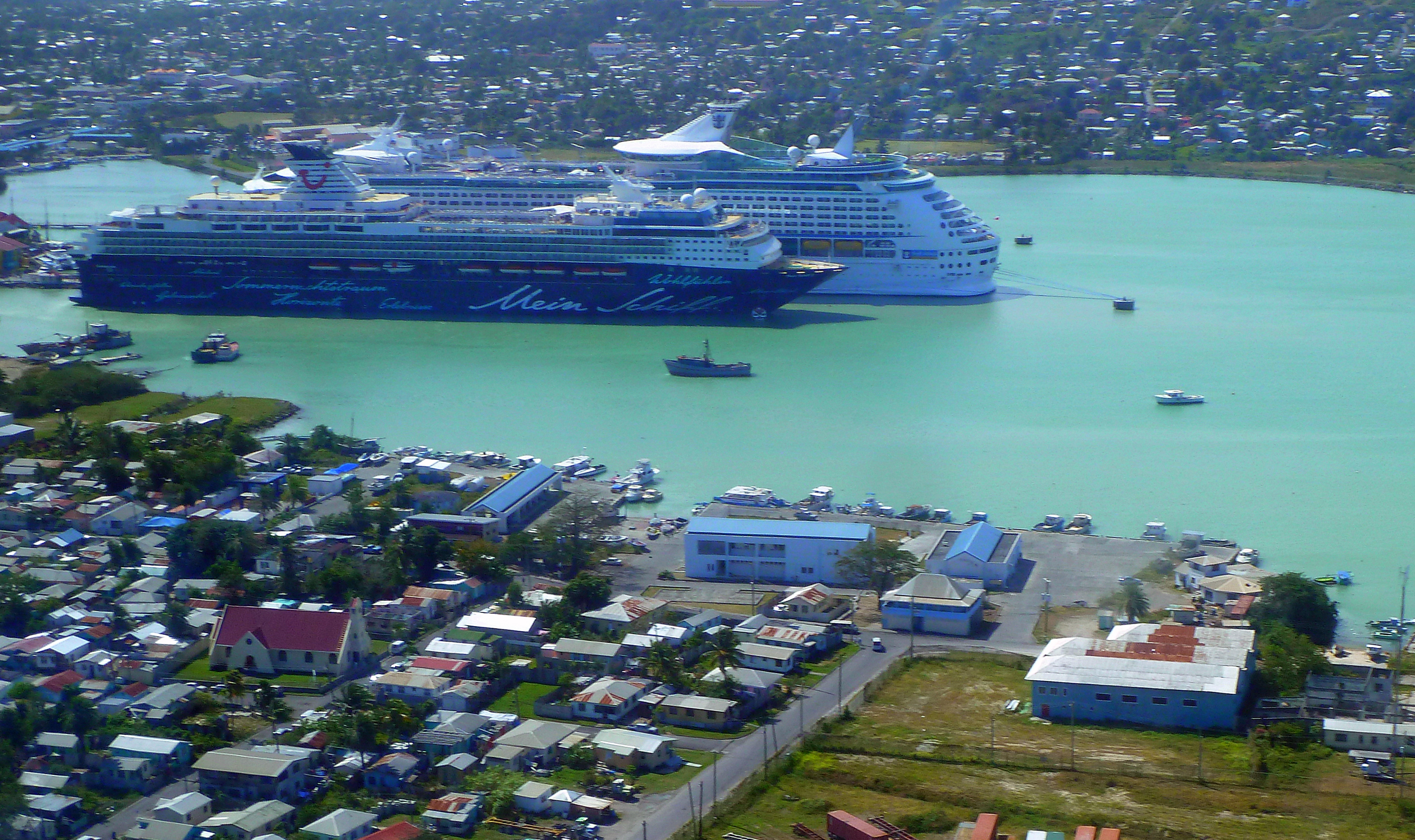
- The harbour in March 2012
- Interactive map of St. John's Harbour

Location
- Country: Antigua and Barbuda
- Location: St. John's, Saint John
- Coordinates: 17°07′18.19″N 61°51′09.11″W

Details
- Operated by: Antigua and Barbuda Port Authority
- Owned by: Government of Antigua and Barbuda

Statistics
- Website anuport.com (shipping) antiguacruiseport.com (passenger)

St. John's Harbour, also known as Deepwater Harbour, is the largest port in Antigua and Barbuda. With the port located in the country's main financial hub, Downtown St. John's, the area was chosen as the site of a planned city in 1668. At that time, the harbour was simply known as "The Cove". The French attempted to attack the harbour during their 1666 invasion of Antigua.

The harbour provides services for both shippers and tourists. The facility has a draught of 35 feet (11 m). Ships have no width limit. There are two quays: Heritage Quay and Redcliffe Quay. There is also a waterfront.

Part of the harbour is Antigua Cruise Port, which is currently undergoing expansion and is part of the government's strategy to make the island into a homeporting centre. The cruise port can handle up to Oasis-class cruise ships.

Historically, seaplanes landed in the harbour before the opening of the Villa Airstrip.
