= List of airlines of the Dutch Caribbean =

This is a list of airlines currently operating in the Dutch Caribbean, that is, the Caribbean Islands that formerly comprised the Netherlands Antilles and remain part of the Kingdom of the Netherlands. The islands are Aruba, Curaçao, and Sint Maartin, each of which is a constituent country of the Kingdom, as well as the special municipalities of Bonaire, Saba, and Sint Eustatius.

== Active ==
=== Scheduled and regional airlines ===
Airline	Image	IATA	ICAO	Callsign	Hub(s)	Founded	Notes
Aruba Airlines		AG	ARU	ARUBA	Queen Beatrix International Airport	2006	
Divi Divi Air		3R	DVR	DIVI AIR	Curaçao International Airport	2000	
Winair		WM	WIA	WINAIR	Princess Juliana International Airport	1961	
Z Air		7Z	EZR	EASYWAY	Flamingo International Airport; Curaçao International Airport	2000	

=== Charter airlines ===
Airline	Image	IATA	ICAO	Callsign	Hub(s)	Founded	Notes
Comlux Aruba			CXB	STARLUX	Queen Beatrix International Airport	2006	
Dutch Caribbean Islandhopper					Curaçao International Airport	2016	
E-Liner Airways		EL	ELA	E-LINER	Curaçao International Airport	1993	
Global Jet Aruba			GJW	PLATA	Queen Beatrix International Airport	2022	
HWC Aviation					Queen Beatrix International Airport		
SXM Airways			SXM	SAINT MAARTEN	Princess Juliana International Airport	2015	
Windward Express			WEA	DAYSTAR	Princess Juliana International Airport	2000	
World Sonic Air					Queen Beatrix International Airport	2019	Planned

== Defunct ==
Airline	Image	IATA	ICAO	Callsign	Founded	Ceased operations	Notes
ABC Commuter Airways					1981	1988	
Air ALM		LM	ALM	ANTILLEAN	1997	2001	
Air Aruba		FQ	ARU	ARUBA	1984	2000	
Air Caribbean		XC	CLT		1991	2000	
ALM Antillean Airlines		LM	ALM	ANTILLEAN	1964	1997	Renamed to Air ALM.
ArubaExel			RBX	ARUBA	2004	2005	
Avia Air		3R	ARB	AVIAIR	1987	2003	
Bestfly Aruba			BFY	MWANGO BEST	2016	2026	License revoked.
BonairExel		9H	BXL	BONEXEL	2003	2005	Renamed to Bonaire Express.
Bonair Express		9H	BXL	BON EXPRESS	2005	2005	Merged with Curaçao Express to form Dutch Antilles Express.
Bonaire Airways		F5			1996	1996	Never launched.
CTLM		CJ	CLT		1962	1991	Renamed to Air Caribbean
CuraçaoExel					2004	2005	Rebranded as Curaçao Express.
Curaçao Express					2005	2005	Merged with Bonaire Express to form Dutch Antilles Express.
Dutch Antilles Express		9H	DNL	DUTCH ANTILLES	2005	2013	
Dutch Caribbean Airlines		K8	ALM	DUTCH CARIBBEAN	2001	2004	
Dutch Caribbean Express		K8	DCE	DUTCH CARIBBEAN	2001	2004	
DutchCaribbeanExel					2004	2005	
Fly Aruba		AG			2010	2012	Never launched.
Insel Air		7I	INC	INSELAIR	1993	2019	
Insel Air Aruba		8I	NLU	INSEL ARUBA	2012	2017	
JetAir Caribbean		4J	JRC	JETAIR	2019	2024	
KLM West-Indisch Bedrijf					1934	1964	Rebranded as ALM Antillean Airlines.
Royal Aruban Airlines		V5	RYL	ROYAL ARUBAN	2001	2005	
Tiara Air		3P	TMN	TIARA	2006	2016	Went bankrupt.
United Caribbean Airlines		4J	UCB	EAGLE EYE	2006	2018	Rebranded as JetAir Caribbean.
West Caribbean Aruba			WAU	WEST ARUBA	2004	2006	Never launched.

== See also ==
- List of airlines of the Americas
- List of defunct airlines of the Americas
- List of largest airlines in Central America & the Caribbean
