= Z Air =

Regional airline in Curaçao

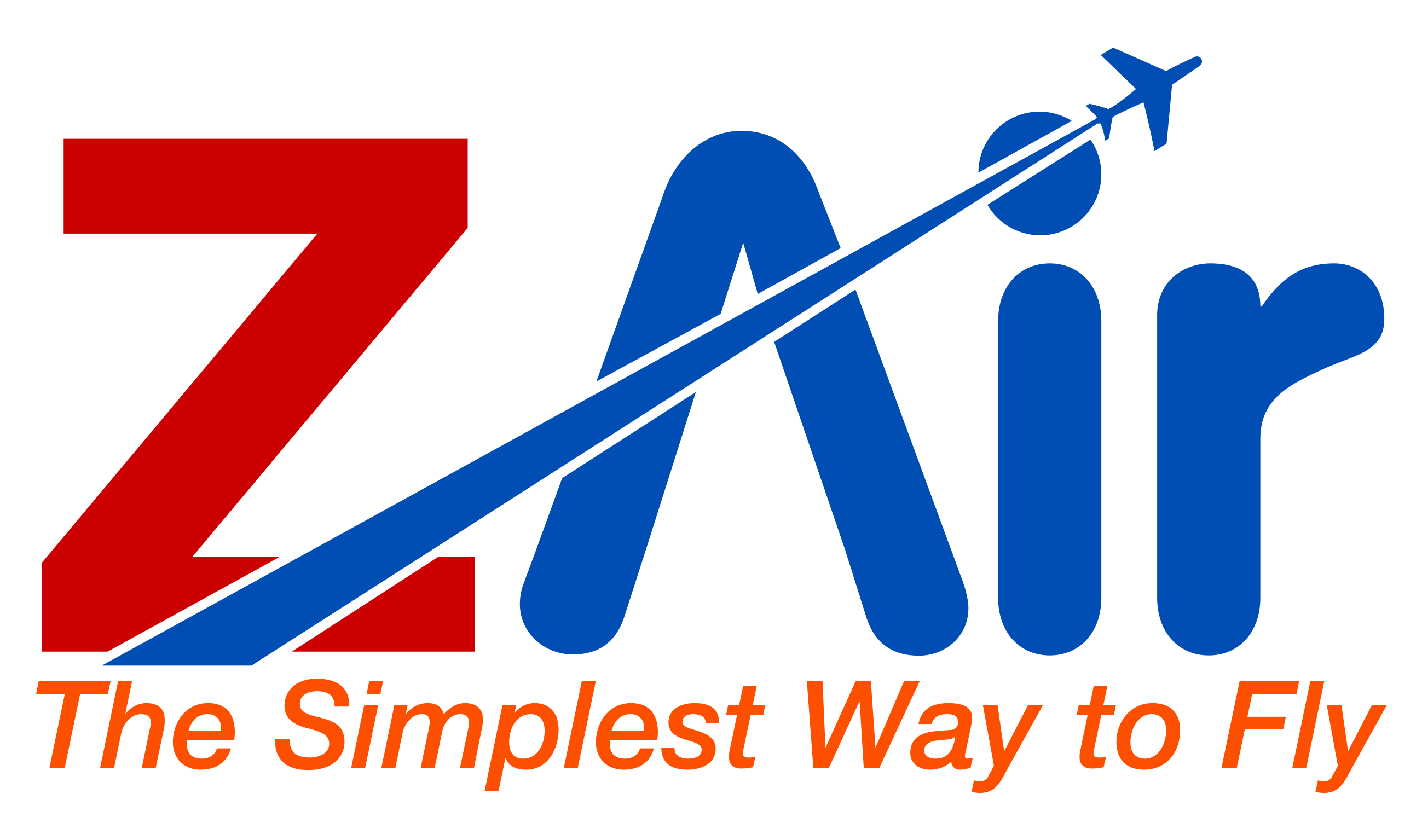
IATA	ICAO	Call sign
7Z	EZR	EASYWAY
- Founded: May 2000
- Hubs: Curaçao International Airport
- Focus cities: Flamingo International Airport
- Fleet size: 7
- Destinations: 10
- Headquarters: Curaçao
- Key people: Rene Winkel (CEO)
- Founder: Captain Rene Winkel
- Website: flyzair.com

Z Air B.V. (formerly EZ Air) is a small regional airline and Air Ambulance provider BES, founded in May 2000. It is based in Bonaire, with ticket offices in the southern Caribbean Sea islands of Bonaire and Curaçao.

== Services ==
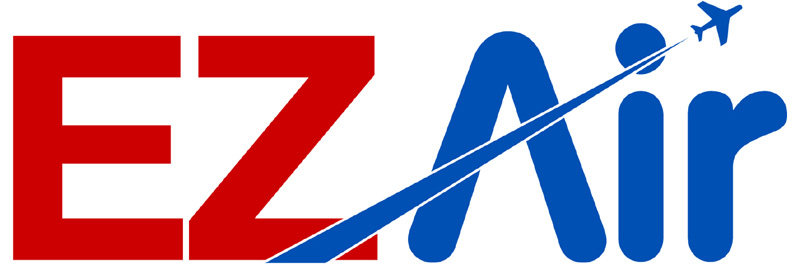
Former logo and name

Z Air operated five daily flights between Bonaire and Curaçao, with additional charter flights to sister island Aruba. The Bonaire-Curaçao flights last around 20 minutes.

Since 2012, it has operated Learjet dedicated Air Ambulance primary transfers to Medellín and Bogotá, Colombia medical Crew outsourced to Fundacion Mariadall. It is in the process of acquiring an additional Learjet 55. It is awaiting the return of FAA category 1 status to service the mainland United States for air ambulance flights.

The airline operates flights between Aruba, Bonaire, and Curaçao as medical flights transporting passengers between the islands utilizing the BN2. They also operate Learjet flights between the islands and the United States and Colombia.

On June 14, 2018, the board of the Pension Fund for Caribbean Netherlands (PCN) announced, that after a preparatory period of almost 18 months, to invest in the purchase of aircraft for the airline EZ Air. With the loan provided to Bonaire-based Medicair N.V., through the Participation Company Caribbean Netherlands (PMCN), established by PCN, two Beechcraft 1900D aircraft will shortly be purchased that will take care of regional flights. In addition, the required working capital is also provided for the start-up of the EZ-Air operation.

The aircraft in question was, until recently, used for flight operations on behalf of Air Canada Express. The aircraft, with 19 seats each, will be used under the brand name EZ-Air for flights between the ABC islands, flights between Bonaire and St. Eustatius and flights to Colombia. The aircraft have been specially selected for their ability to fly directly to various destinations, within an acceptable time and with sufficient comfort. The relatively long distances, for example on the route between Bonaire and St. Eustatius, brought about several requirements for the aircraft, which among other things have a toilet and reasonable baggage capacity.

Rene Winkel, director of Medicair and EZ Air, has enormous experience in local aviation. He previously flew as a captain for both the Winair and ALM Antillean Airlines. In addition, with his company Medicair, he has been carrying out ambulance flights between Bonaire and Colombia since the year 2000. The name EZ-Air is not new on the islands. In the past, Winkel has been executing flights between Bonaire and Curaçao for several years with two Britten-Norman aircraft.

For PCN there were various considerations to invest in EZ Air. “First, it must be said that this is a solid business case,” said PCN chairman Harald Linkels. “Over the past few months, we have worked intensively with the EZ Air team and together we have looked at the type of aircraft, the routes that can be served, and the commercial plan. From the very start we noticed in a positive sense the solidity and the level of detail in the business plan,“ says Linkels.

In addition, Linkels says that the fund mainly wants to invest locally in matters that benefit the islands and the residents. “Although it is regularly stated that aviation is a risky industry, it is also a fact that we as islands can’t do without aviation,” says Linkels. The PCN chairman says it is extremely sour that every time the island picks the bitter fruits of the malaise in aviation on the neighboring island of Curaçao. “Let’s be honest. Bonaire is not the priority of most airlines based in Curaçao. As soon as something goes wrong there, as in the case of ALM, DCA, DAE and now Insel Air, this has dramatic consequences for Bonaire. People can’t leave the island, doctor visits have to be canceled, and doing business out of Bonaire in Curaçao or Aruba has become nearly impossible“ says Linkels. It is also important for St. Eustatius to have a direct and reliable connection with Bonaire.

On August 9, 2019, the EZ Air executed a charter flight between Bonaire and Barranquilla, Colombia. The airline has in the meantime received approval to execute scheduled flights between Curaçao and Barranquilla and expects this route in the last quarter of 2019.

EZ Air was granted its air operator's certificate (AOC) and started regular flights on December 23, 2019, executing daily flights between Curaçao, Bonaire, and Aruba.

In June 2022, the company announced it had acquired two Saab 2000 aircraft. These 50-seat planes are planned for use in longer routes, such as to Sint Maarten from either Bonaire or Curaçao; their speed and higher cruising altitude will make these destinations more practical than the previous fleet.

In October 2023, the airline was renamed to Z Air, to avoid legal actions from British company EasyGroup over trademark infringement.

== Destinations ==
Country	City	Airport	Notes	Refs
Aruba	Oranjestad	Queen Beatrix International Airport		
Bonaire	Kralendijk	Flamingo International Airport	Focus city	
Sint Eustatius	Oranjestad	F. D. Roosevelt Airport		
Curaçao	Willemstad	Curaçao International Airport	Base	
Sint Maarten	Philipsburg	Princess Juliana International Airport		
Colombia	Barranquilla	Ernesto Cortissoz International Airport		
Colombia	Bogotá	El Dorado International Airport	Air ambulance	
Colombia	Bucaramanga	Palonegro International Airport	Air ambulance	
Colombia	Cali	Alfonso Bonilla Aragón International Airport	Air ambulance	
Colombia	Medellín	José María Córdova International Airport		

== Fleet ==
=== Current ===
As of July 2025, Z Air consists of the following:

Z Air fleet
Aircraft	In service	Orders	Passengers	Notes
Embraer ERJ 140LR	2 as of July 2026	—	44	
Learjet 31A	1	—	6	Ambulance
Learjet 35A	1	—	6	Ambulance
Saab 340	3 (as of July 2026)	—	34	
Total	7	0		

=== Former ===
Over the years, the airline has operated the following aircraft types:

- 2 Beechcraft 1900D
- 2 Britten-Norman BN-2A Islander
- 1 Cessna 182Q
- 1 Learjet 55
- 1 Piper Chieftain PA31-350
- 2 Piper Seneca II PA34-200

== See also ==
- List of airlines of the Dutch Caribbean
