= NLU =

NLU may refer to:

- Natural-language understanding, in computational linguistics and AI
- National Labor Union, United States, 1866–1873
- National Law Universities, in India
- National-Louis University, Illinois, United States
- University of Louisiana at Monroe (called Northeast Louisiana University 1969–1999), United States
- "Not Like Us", 2024 diss track by Kendrick Lamar
- Felipe Ángeles International Airport, Zumpango, Mexico (opened 2022; IATA code: NLU)
- Insel Air Aruba, a Dutch Caribbean airline (2012–2017; ICAO code: NLU)
