= JetAir Caribbean =

Private airline based in Curaçao

JetAir
IATA	ICAO	Call sign
4J	JRC	JETAIR
- Founded: 2006
- Commenced operations: November 24, 2019
- Ceased operations: June 18, 2024
- Hubs: Curaçao International Airport
- Fleet size: 2
- Destinations: 7
- Headquarters: Willemstad, Curaçao
- Website: www.jetaircaribbean.com

JetAir Caribbean (legally United Caribbean Airlines BV) was a privately owned airline based in Curaçao in the southern Caribbean Sea.

== History ==
JetAir Caribbean was founded as a charter airline in 2006 as United Caribbean Airlines and rebranded as JetAir in 2019. The airline faced a crisis with poor management decisions leading to an imminent shutdown. The airline ceased operations on June 18, 2024.

== Destinations ==
The airline served several destinations in the Caribbean and South America.

Country / region	City	Airport	Notes	Refs
Aruba	Oranjestad	Queen Beatrix International Airport		
Bonaire	Kralendijk	Flamingo International Airport		
Colombia	Medellín	José María Córdova International Airport		
Curaçao	Willemstad	Curaçao International Airport	Hub	
Dominican Republic	Santo Domingo	Las Américas International Airport	Terminated	
Jamaica	Kingston	Norman Manley International Airport		
Sint Maarten	Philipsburg	Princess Juliana International Airport		
Suriname	Paramaribo	Johan Adolf Pengel International Airport		

== Fleet ==
At the time operations ceased in November 2024, the fleet consisted of two Fokker 70s. One had been grounded to provide spare parts for the other.

== See also ==
- List of defunct airlines of the Netherlands Antilles
