= E-Liner Airways =

IATA	ICAO	Call sign
EL	ELA	E-LINER
- Founded: 1993
- Operating bases: Hato International Airport
- Headquarters: Willemstad, Curaçao
- Website: http://www.e-liner.net/

E-Liner Airways Inc., better known as DBA (ELA Airlines), is an airline based in Willemstad, Curaçao. The airline started with sightseeing flights and day tours to Aruba and Bonaire. It is based at the Hato International Airport.

- IATA designator: EL
- ICAO designator: ELA
- Numeric Code: 123

== Services ==
- Daily commuter flights between Curaçao and Aruba
- Daily commuter flights between Curaçao and Bonaire
- Charter flights within the Caribbean

It also serves:

- Bogotá, Colombia
- Valencia, Venezuela
- Maiquetía, Venezuela (airport serving the capital Caracas)
- Las Piedras, Venezuela

== Fleet ==
- 2 - Piper PA-31 Navajo Chieftain
- 1 - Piper PA-34 Seneca
