= Dutch Caribbean Airlines =

Curaçaoan airline

IATA	ICAO	Call sign
K8	DCE	DUTCH CARIBBEAN
- Founded: 2001
- Ceased operations: October 2004
- Hubs: Curaçao International Airport
- Subsidiaries: Dutch Caribbean Express
- Fleet size: 12
- Destinations: 17
- Parent company: DC Holding
- Headquarters: Willemstad, Curaçao
- Key people: Mario Evertsz (Director)
- Website: Former website

Dutch Caribbean Airlines Inc. (DCA) was an airline based on the southern Caribbean Sea island of Curaçao, part of the Kingdom of the Netherlands. It launched in 2001 but ceased operations in October 2004 and declared bankruptcy. The company slogan was Bridge to Curaçao.

== History ==
When ALM Antillean Airlines (Air ALM) shut down in 2001, DCA was created to take its place and avoid bankruptcy. Both companies had the same owner, DC Beheer (a holding company).

== Destinations ==
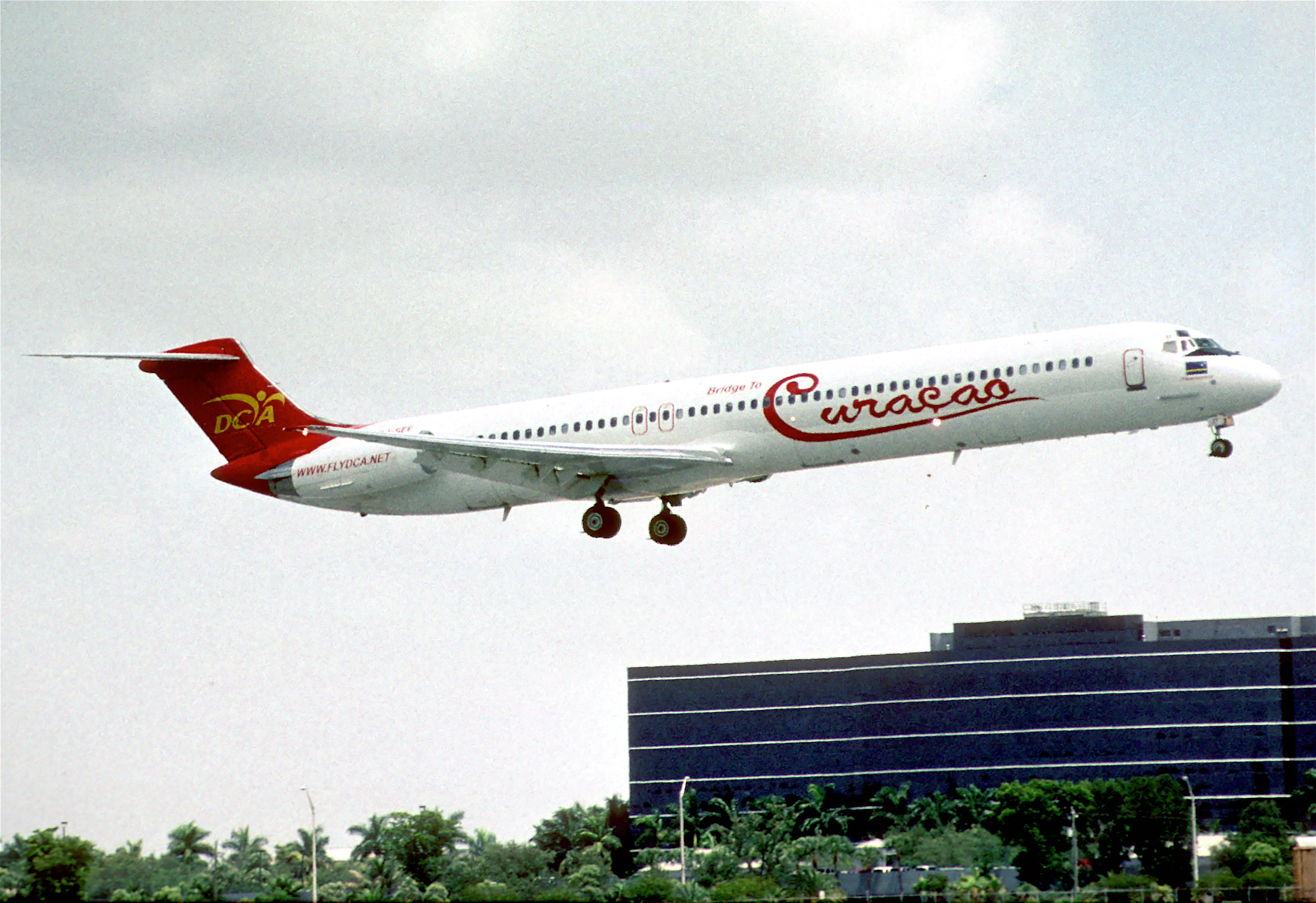
DCA MD-82 at Miami in 2003

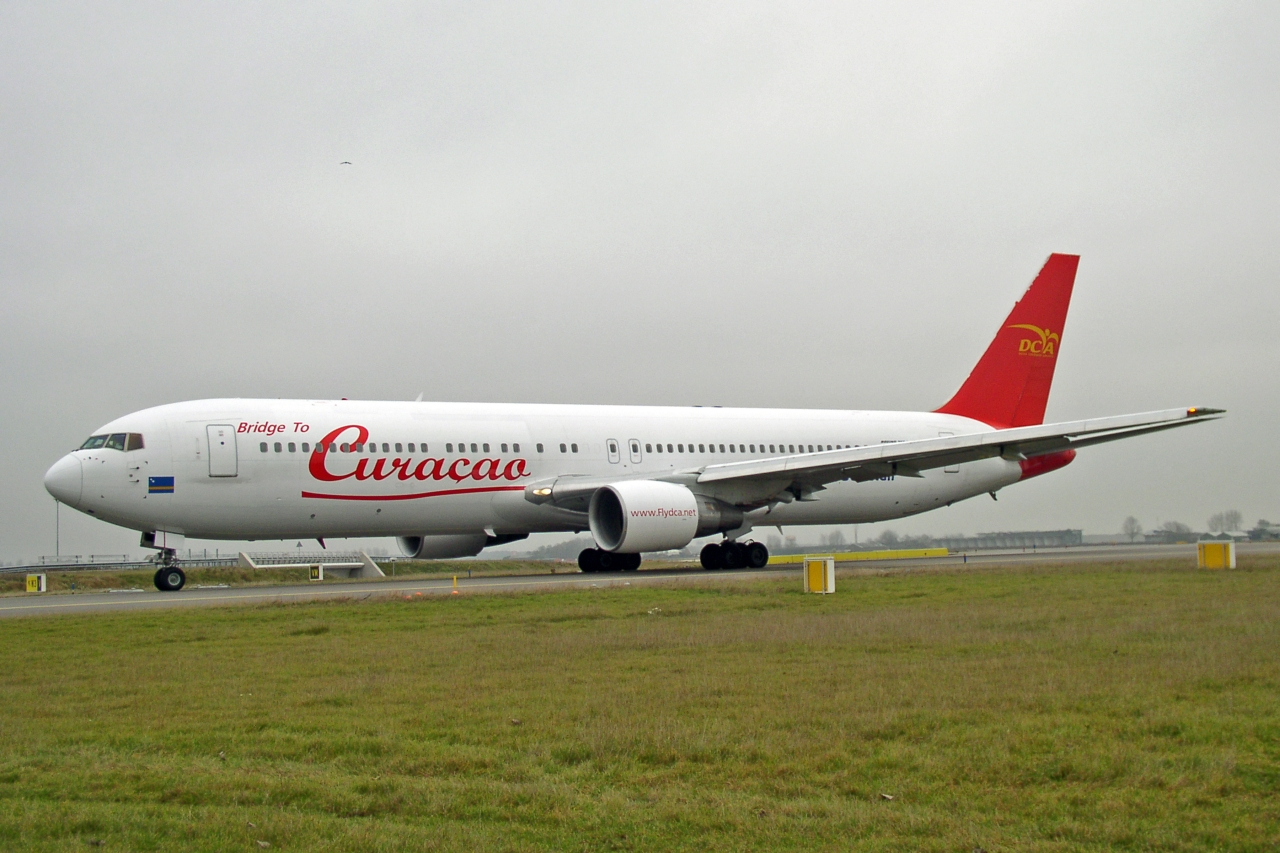
DCA 767 at Amsterdam in 2003

The airline served these routes while it was still in operation:

City	Country	Airport	Notes
Oranjestad	Aruba	Queen Beatrix International Airport	
Puerto Plata	Dominican Republic	Gregorio Luperón International Airport	
Punta Cana	Dominican Republic	Punta Cana International Airport	
Santo Domingo	Dominican Republic	Las Americas International Airport	
Cologne	Germany	Cologne Bonn Airport	
Port-au-Prince	Haiti	Port-au-Prince International Airport	
Amsterdam	Netherlands	Amsterdam Airport Schiphol	
Kralendijk	Netherlands Antilles	Flamingo International Airport	
Willemstad	Netherlands Antilles	Hato International Airport	Hub
Philipsburg	Netherlands Antilles	Princess Juliana International Airport	
Paramaribo	Suriname	Johan Adolf Pengel International Airport	
Port of Spain	Trinidad and Tobago	Piarco International Airport	
Miami	United States	Miami International Airport	
Caracas	Venezuela	Simón Bolívar International Airport	
Las Piedras	Venezuela	Josefa Camejo International Airport	
Maracaibo	Venezuela	La Chinita International Airport	
Valencia	Venezuela	Arturo Michelena International Airport	

== Fleet ==
During the transfer of the airline's assets from Air ALM, the airline acquired some of their aircraft and later received other aircraft for its own.

DCA fleet
Aircraft	Total	Introduced	Retired	Notes
Boeing 767-300ER	1	2003	2004	Leased from Sobelair
Bombardier Dash 8-300	2	2001	2004	Operated as Dutch Caribbean Express; Transferred from Air ALM then later sold to LIAT
De Havilland Canada Dash 6-300 Twin Otter	2	2003	2004	
McDonnell Douglas DC-9-32	4	2002	2004	Sold to Aserca Airlines
McDonnell Douglas MD-82	3	2002	2004	Transferred from Air ALM

== See also ==
- List of defunct airlines of the Netherlands Antilles
