= ALM Antillean Airlines =

Netherlands Antillean airline

Antilliaanse Luchtvaart Maatschappij
IATA	ICAO	Call sign
LM	ALM	ANTILLEAN
- Founded: August 1, 1964; 62 years ago
- Ceased operations: September 2001; 25 years ago
- Hubs: Curaçao International Airport; Flamingo International Airport; Queen Beatrix International Airport (until 1988)
- Focus cities: Ernesto Cortissoz International Airport; Miami International Airport; La Chinita International Airport; Princess Juliana International Airport; Simón Bolívar International Airport
- Subsidiaries: Winair (1970s)
- Parent company: KLM (1964-1969)
- Headquarters: Willemstad, Curaçao, Netherlands Antilles
- Website: Airalm.com

ALM Antillean Airlines (Dutch: Antilliaanse Luchtvaart Maatschappij), and later Air ALM, was the main airline of the Netherlands Antilles between its foundation in 1964 and its shut-down in 2001, operating out of Aruba, Bonaire, and Curaçao. It was based at Hato International Airport.

== History ==
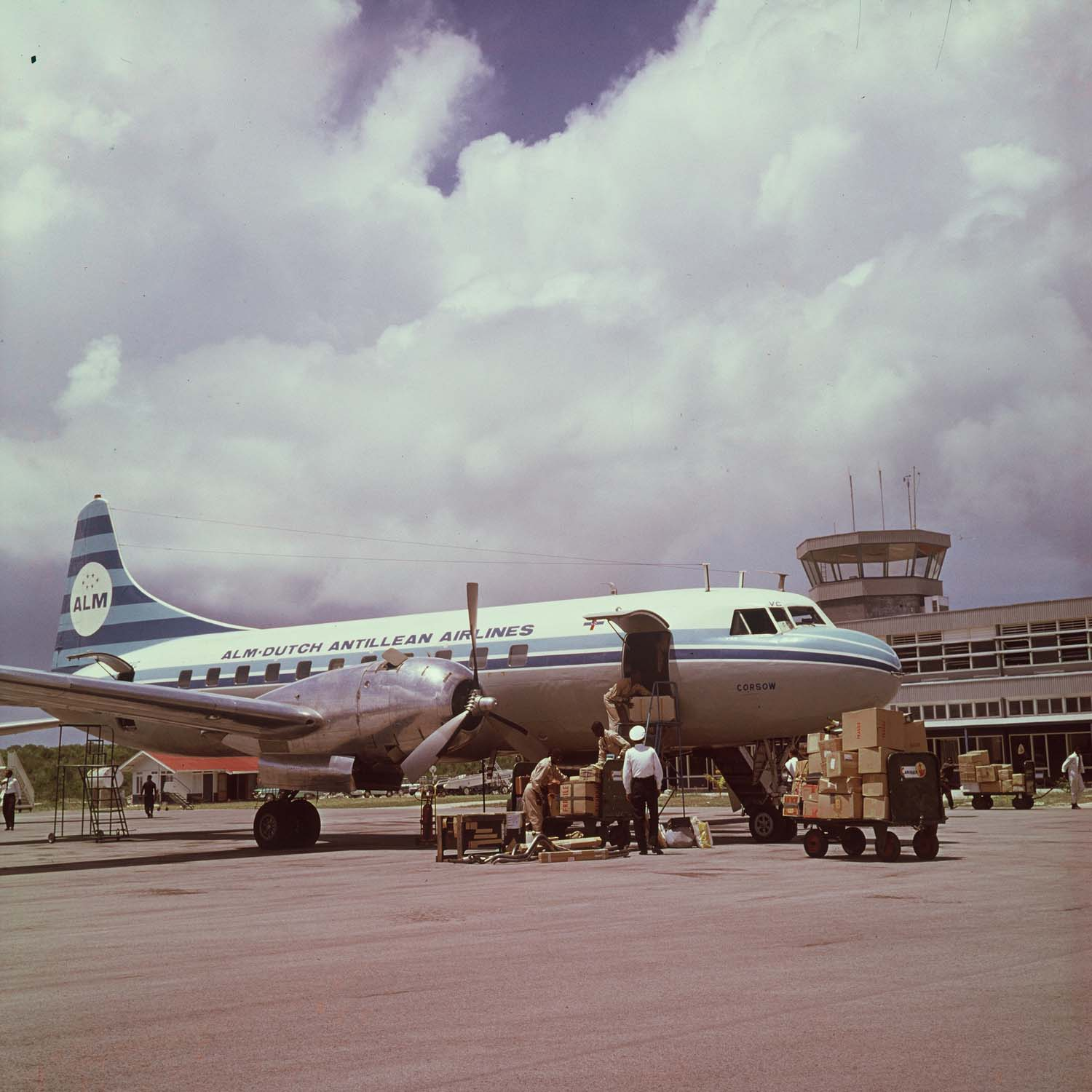
ALM on Sint Maarten

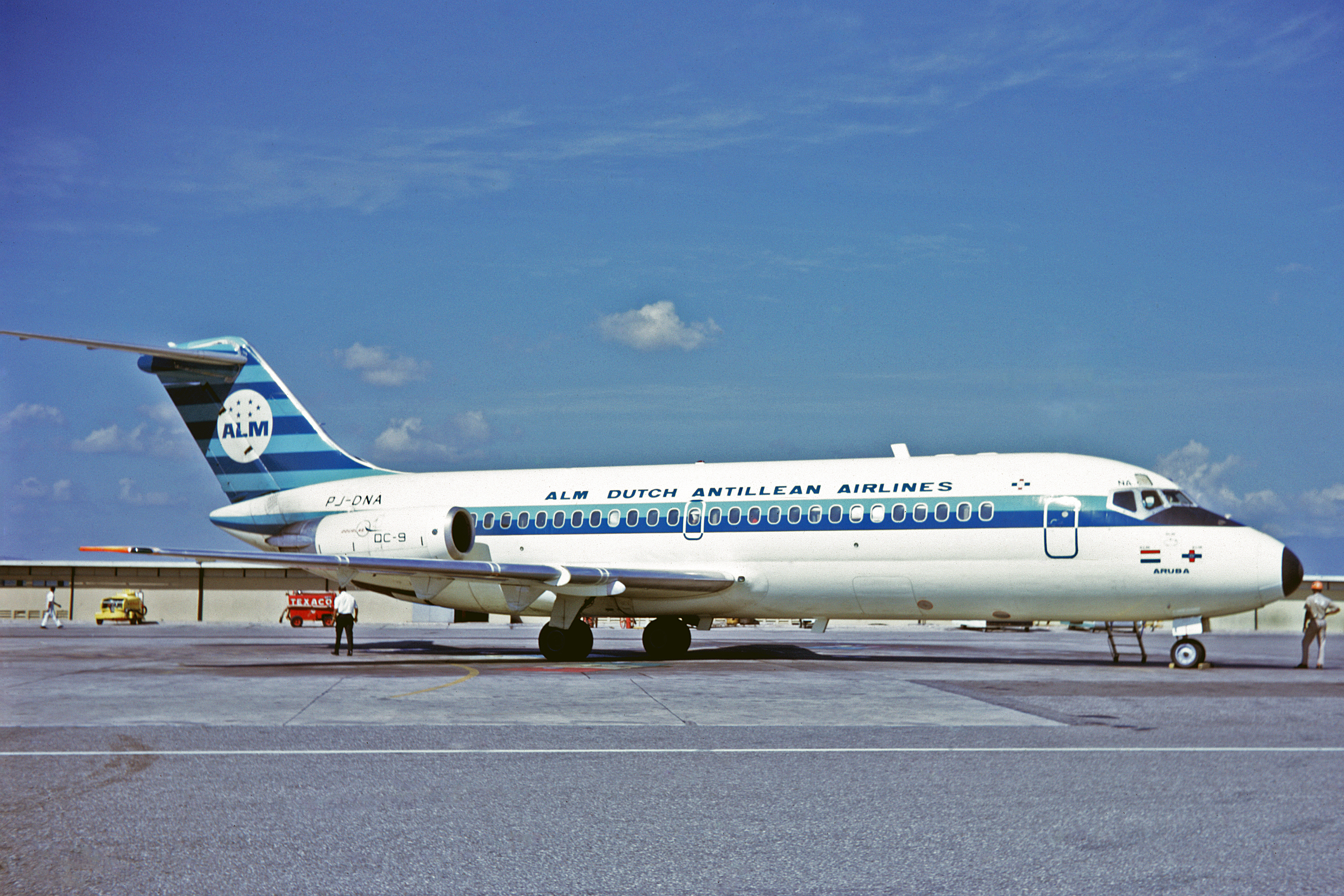
ALM Douglas DC-9-15 parked in Kingston, Jamaica, circa 1971

ALM Antillean Airlines was founded on August 1, 1964, by the conversion from KLM West-Indisch Bedrijf (West Indies Division). ALM operated as a part of KLM Royal Dutch Airlines, who wanted to make Curaçao the hub for their American operations and to provide an American link between the Far East and Europe. KLM had been doing this between 1934 and 1946 using Fokker F.XVIII PH-AIS Snip, which had been reregistered PJ-AIS for use from the Netherlands Antilles, Fokker F.VIII "Duif" and two Douglas DC-5. After the latter were sold to the Dutch East Indies, flights were carried oud by Lockheed 14/18, Douglas DC3/C47 and C54 aircraft. ALM started with three Convair 340s and served seven destinations. In addition to the airline business, ALM also provided catering and airline servicing for other companies using the Curaçao and Aruba airports. Its main destinations were Aruba, Bonaire, St Maarten, St Kitts, Maracaibo, Barranquilla and Caracas. Due to the surge in tourism, ALM quickly grew, and the Convairs were replaced by two Douglas DC-9-15s jets (ex KLM) and two brand new turboprop Fokker F27-500 series. New destinations were added, and an ex Viasa DC-9 was also added to the fleet.

The period of 1968 and 1969 was crucial for ALM. By January 1, 1969, the Antillean government took a 96% share from KLM and ALM became a state-owned company. An ex-KLM Douglas DC-8 was chartered to further use the booming tourist industry. Now ALM was able to fly directly to New York and Miami. Later on, Panama and Costa Rica were added as destinations. The New York to St Maarten route (1970 to 1973) was flown with a chartered Boeing 727-100 provided by Braniff International Airlines and also at one point with an Overseas National Airways (ONA) McDonnell Douglas DC-9-30.

The Fokker F-27s were replaced by a third DC-9-15 also from KLM and ALM became an all-jet passenger airline for a short time. During this time in August 1972, a Douglas DC-6B was purchased for the cargo routes. Windward Islands' Winair was acquired, with its fleet of turboprop, STOL capable de Havilland Canada DHC-6 Twin Otter (series 300 aircraft), by the Antillean government. It became apparent that on the short flights to Aruba and Bonaire, the DC-9 jet was not cost-effective. A temporary solution was found in the shape of two Twin Otter 100 series. For a while, ALM Twin Otter flights between Aruba-Bonaire-Curaçao were labeled ABC Commuter. After a bumpy start the Twin Otter became a success with the passengers and two further machines (series 300) were added. In the years 1973 through 1978, ALM made a total profit of ANG14.3M. Their raison d'être was to maintain airways between the islands of the Netherlands Antilles, and to promote tourist trade by providing transport.

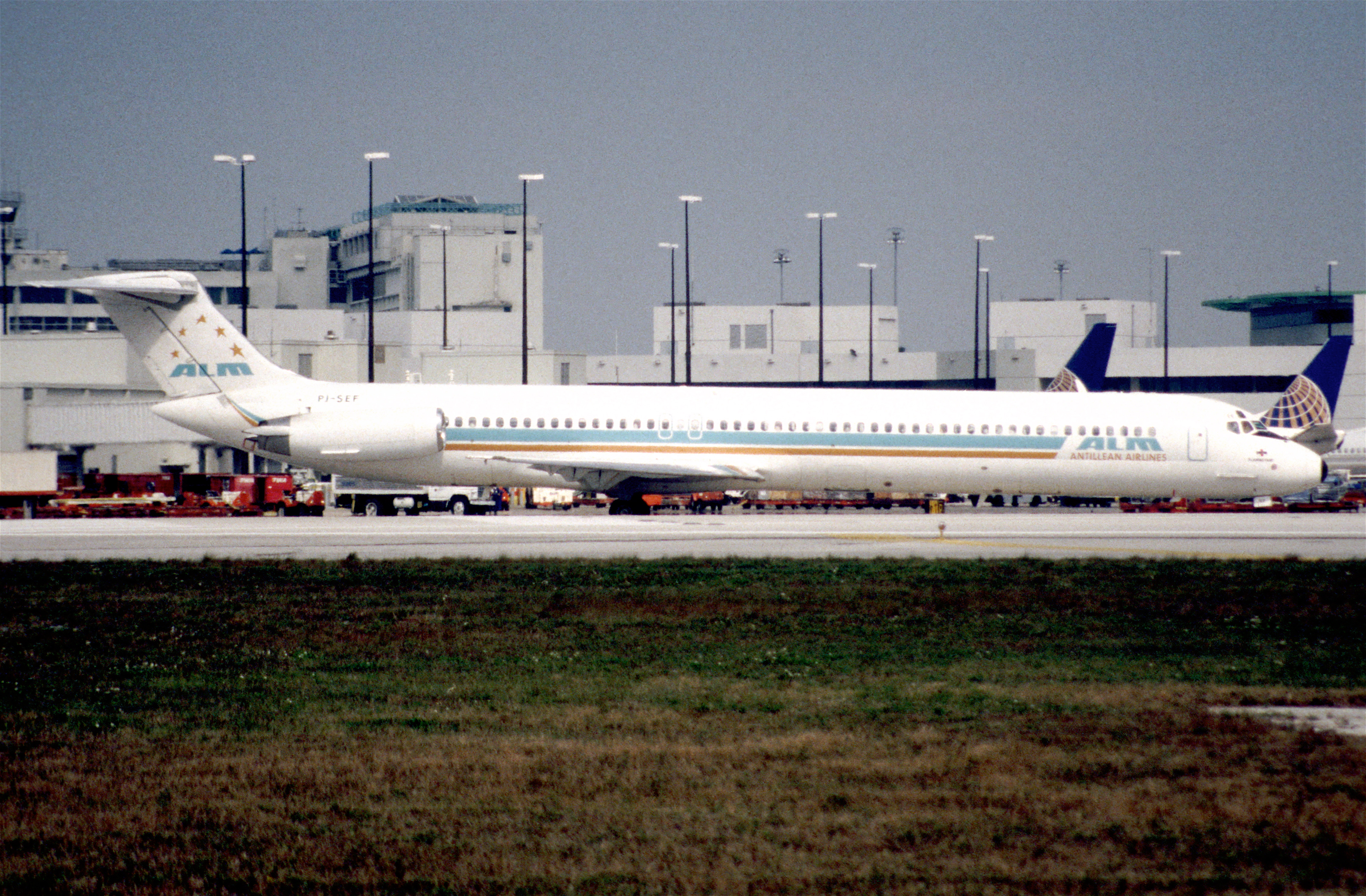
ALM MD-80 in Miami

In 1975, ALM replaced its older DC-9s with the new McDonnell Douglas DC-9-32 series, significantly increasing seating capacity. Two years later, a Boeing 727 was added for additional routes to Chicago, Cleveland, Detroit, and New York, which were mostly operated as charter flights. During this period ALM grew rapidly and its number of personnel doubled in 1977. A year later, a bilateral agreement between the Antillean government and the US was reached whereby ALM was allowed to take over the routes from KLM to the USA. To cope with the demand two Douglas DC-8-53 jets were leased from Rosenbalm Aviation. Additionally, the Twin Otters were replaced by Short SD-330 commuter turboprop aircraft. In 1978, KLM restarted extensive cooperation with ALM. Two DC-8s were brought into the fleet and served the route Curaçao-New York JFK, where KLM handled the ground services. KLM was still hoping and trying to build a hub with ALM. KLM flights from Curaçao-Amsterdam often had at least an ALM cabin crew on board in those years.

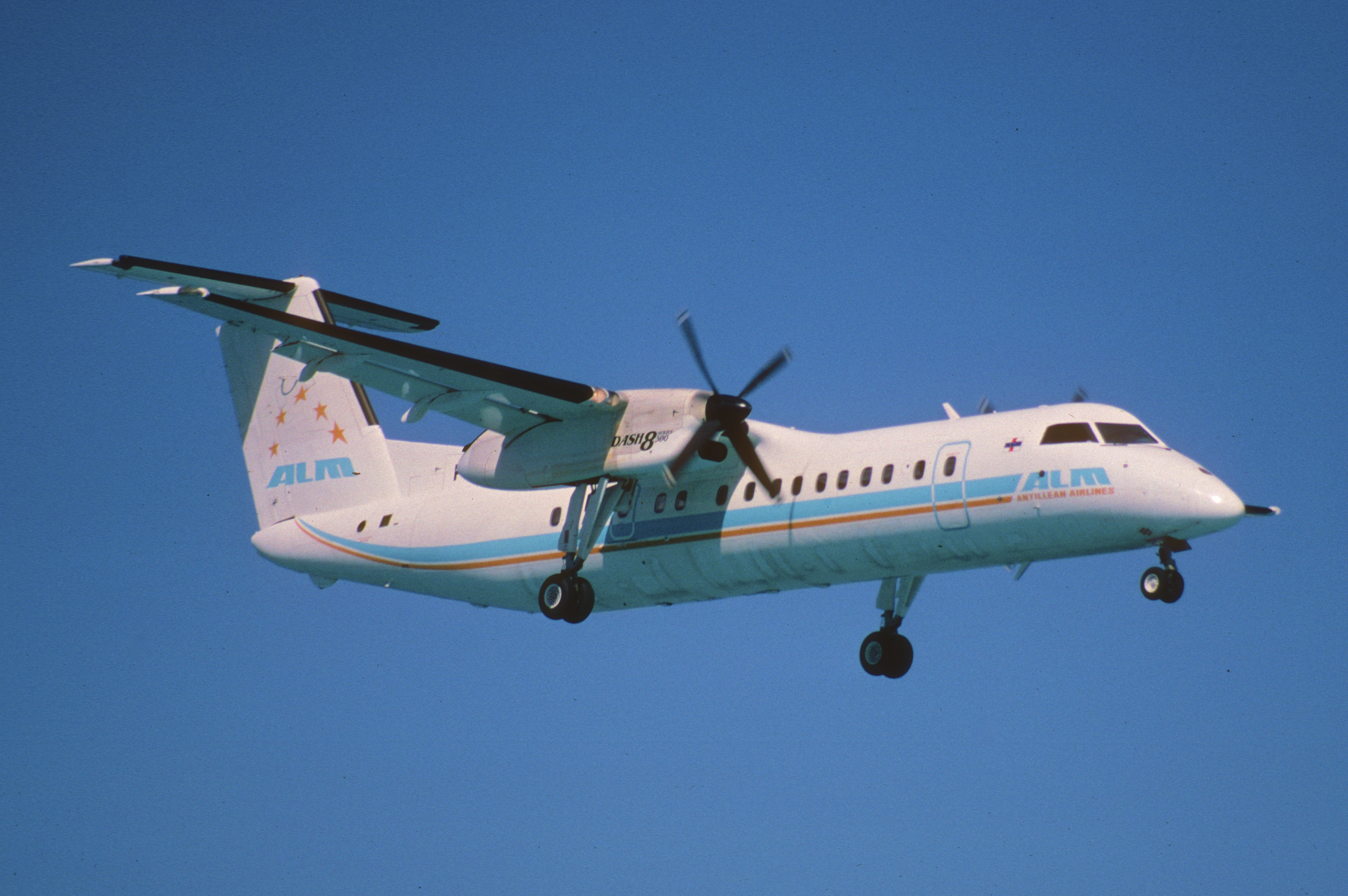
ALM Dash 8 landing at Sint Maarten circa 1990

1979 was a turning point for ALM. The low point of the oil prices coupled with slow tourist figures and the devaluation of the Venezuelan currency, brought ALM into trouble. Additionally, ALM had to deal with competing businesses from Eastern Air Lines and American Airlines on competing routes. The DC-8 flights were halted and the newly arrived Short 330s were sold off. During 1980 the Boeing 727 and Beech Queen Air left the company and ALM concentrated on its fleet of four DC-9-32s.

In 1982, ALM decided to replace some of its DC-9s with two McDonnell Douglas MD-80 jetliners, which were leased from Curaçao Aircraft Leasing Company. A third example was later purchased from Continental Airlines. With business slowly improving, ALM was able to purchase additional airplanes which included the purchase of two elderly Fairchild Hiller FH-227 turboprops from Delta Air Transport for the short-haul routes.

=== Cutting costs ===
Due to the separate status of the island of Aruba in 1988, ALM had to contend with another competitor concerning the Aruba service: Air Aruba, which was operating two NAMC YS-11 turboprops on flights to Curaçao. By early 1989 ALM was serving only 13 destinations in the Caribbean basin and also Miami and New York. Although a price war was started between Air Aruba and ALM, this did not last for long. In a few years, the prices for tickets between the three ABC-islands went back to their original levels or even higher. With the sharing of passengers between two competitors, profits on the Aruba-Curaçao route dwindled. Even worse was that the Miami-Curaçao route was also shared. The Miami-Curaçao route was considered one of ALM's most profitable routes. From 1970 through 1982, ALM's average loss was ANG 1.2 million per year, or a total of 15.6M. As 1973-1978 showed a profit, in the remaining years the average loss was ANG 4.3 million, and probably heavier in the period after 1978.

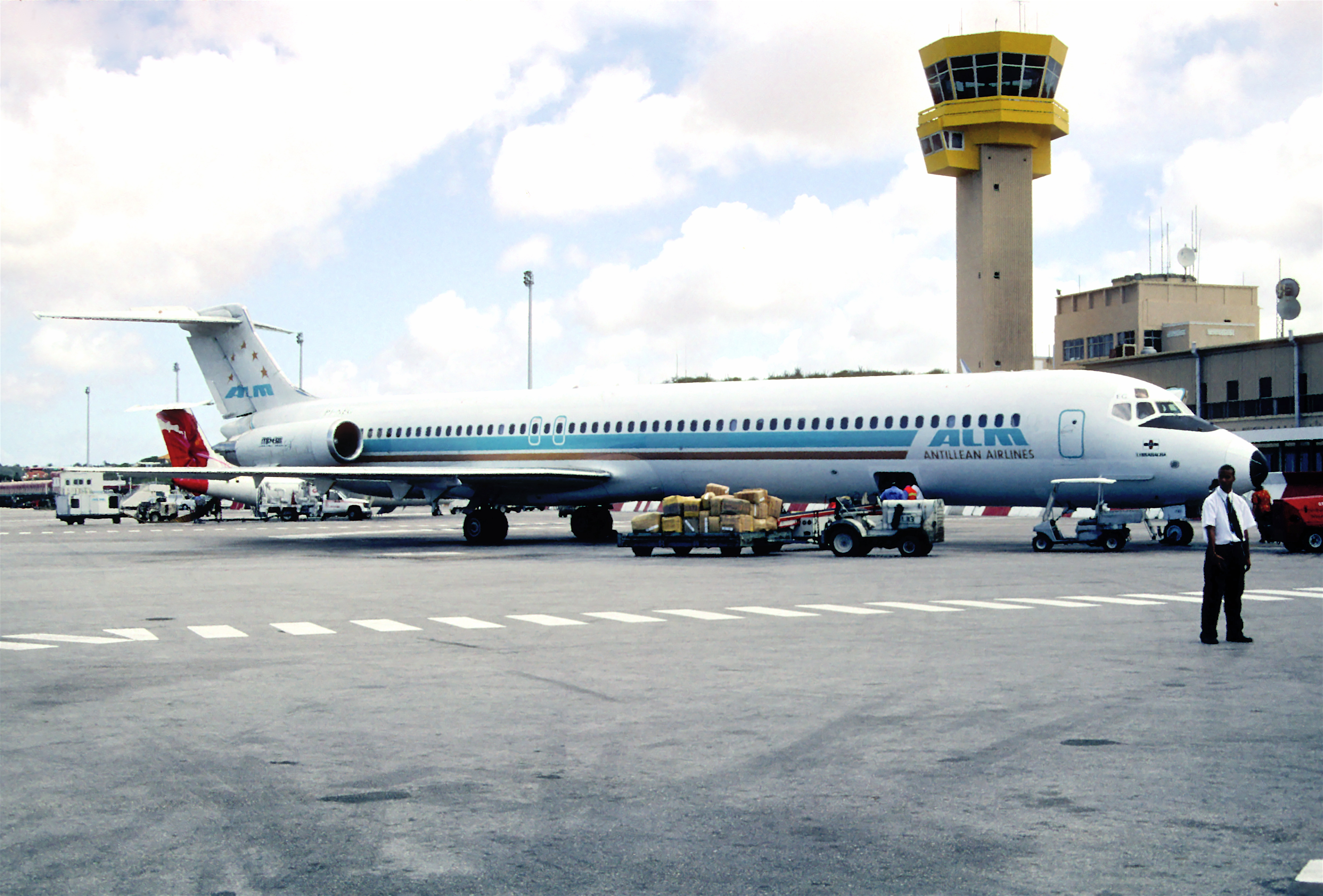
ALM on Curaçao circa 2002

During the 1990s, ALM managed to stay in business despite stiff US competition and political changes in the aviation industry. de Havilland Canada DHC-8 Dash 8 regional turboprop aircraft were added to the fleet. Early 1991 KLM re-invested into ALM with some minor shares. However, due to a lack of government and public interest, ALM could not keep up and slowly went into a dire financial situation. By the year 2000, things were so bad that ALM was on the verge of bankruptcy. KLM had stopped its participation with ALM concerning the Amsterdam-Curaçao flights. Worse for ALM, the KLM flights to Europe and South America now were transferred to Bonaire's Flamingo International Airport, leaving the just-open ALM catering building at Curaçao Hato airport unused. ALM went into bankruptcy by early September 2001 and was then replaced by Dutch Caribbean Airlines, an all-new company using their older DC-9-32s.

== Destinations ==
=== Codeshare agreements ===
ALM had formed agreements that extended its route system:

- KLM
- Martinair
- United Airlines

== Fleet ==
Over the years, ALM operated the following aircraft types:

ALM fleet
Aircraft	Total	Introduced	Retired	Notes
Beechcraft 65	1	1965	1980	
Boeing 727-100	1	1977	1979	
Convair CV-340	3	1964	1970	
de Havilland Canada DHC-6 Twin Otter	2	1974	1978	
De Havilland Dash 8-300	6	1990	2001	
Douglas DC-8-33	2	1978	1978	
Douglas DC-8-53	1	1978	1979	Leased from KLM
Fokker F27-500 Friendship	2	1968	1970	
Lockheed L-188C Electra	3	1989	1994	
McDonnell Douglas DC-9-15	3	1968	1975	Returned to McDonnell Douglas
McDonnell Douglas DC-9-32	7	1970	1988	One written off as Flight 980
McDonnell Douglas MD-82	6	1982	2001	
McDonnell Douglas MD-83	1	1999	2000	Leased from Aero Lloyd
Short 330	2	1978	1980	Sold to Mississippi Valley Airlines

== Incidents and accidents ==
- ALM Flight 980: Operated via a wet lease by Overseas National Airways (ONA), was a scheduled flight from John F. Kennedy International Airport in New York City to Princess Juliana International Airport on St. Maarten. On May 2, 1970, the McDonnell Douglas DC-9-30 (registered N935F) operating the flight ran out of fuel after several unsuccessful landing attempts due to weather conditions, resulting in a water landing and ditching in the Caribbean Sea 48 km (30 mi) off St. Croix and the death of 23 of the 63 people on board.

== See also ==
- List of defunct airlines of the Netherlands Antilles
