= Curaçao International Airport =

Curaçao International Airport Hato International Airport Aeropuerto Internashonal Hato
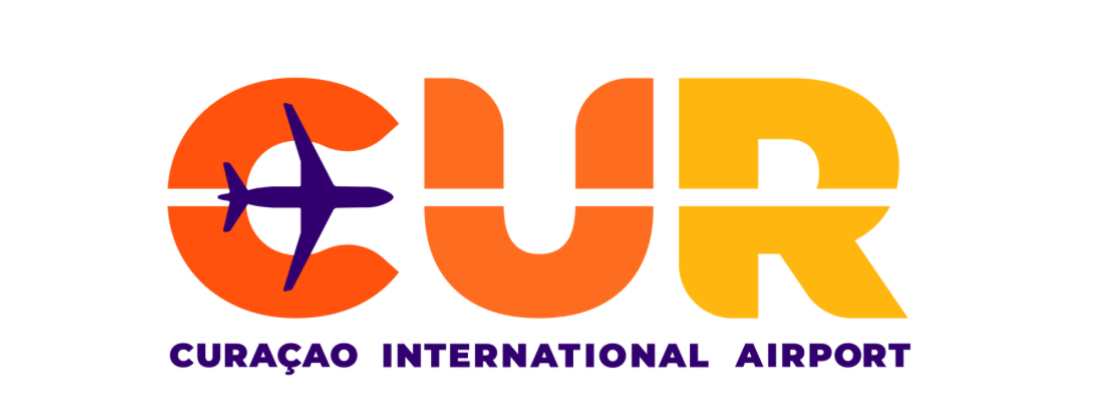

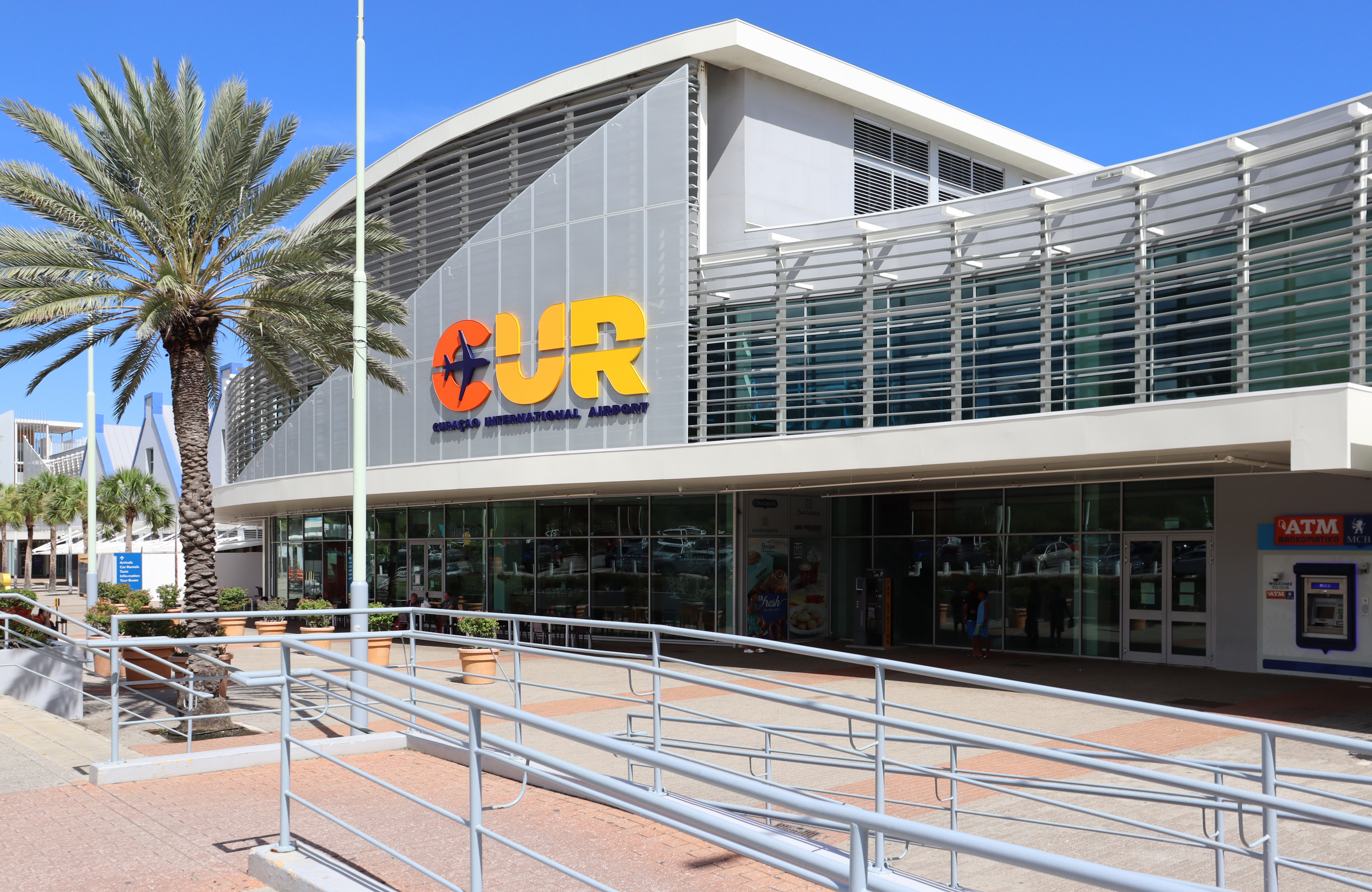
- IATA: CUR; ICAO: TNCC

Summary
- Airport type: Public
- Owner: Curaçao Airport Holding
- Operator: Curaçao Airport Partners
- Serves: Curaçao
- Location: Willemstad, Curaçao
- Hub for: Divi Divi Air; Z Air
- Elevation AMSL: 29 ft (8.8 m)
- Coordinates: 12°11′20″N 068°57′35″W
- Website: curacao-airport.com

Map
- Location in Curaçao

Runways
Direction	Length		Surface
Direction	m	ft	Surface
11/29	3,410	11,188	Asphalt

Statistics (2025)
- Total Passengers: 2,461,000
- Source: Curaçao Airport

Curaçao International Airport (IATA: CUR, ICAO: TNCC) (Papiamento: Aeropuerto Internashonal Hato, Dutch: Hato Internationale Luchthaven), also known as Hato International Airport (formerly Dr. Albert Plesman International Airport), is the only airport for the Dutch Caribbean island of Curaçao, in the southern Caribbean Sea.

The airport is located on the north coast of Curaçao, 12 kilometres (7.5 mi) from the capital Willemstad. The airport connects Curaçao island to Europe, the Americas, and the Caribbean. It has the third longest commercial runway in the Caribbean region, accommodating up to a Boeing 747 and serves as a main base for Divi Divi Air and Z AIR. It formerly served as a main base for ALM, KLM, DCA, DAE, Insel Air, and JetAir Caribbean.

== History ==
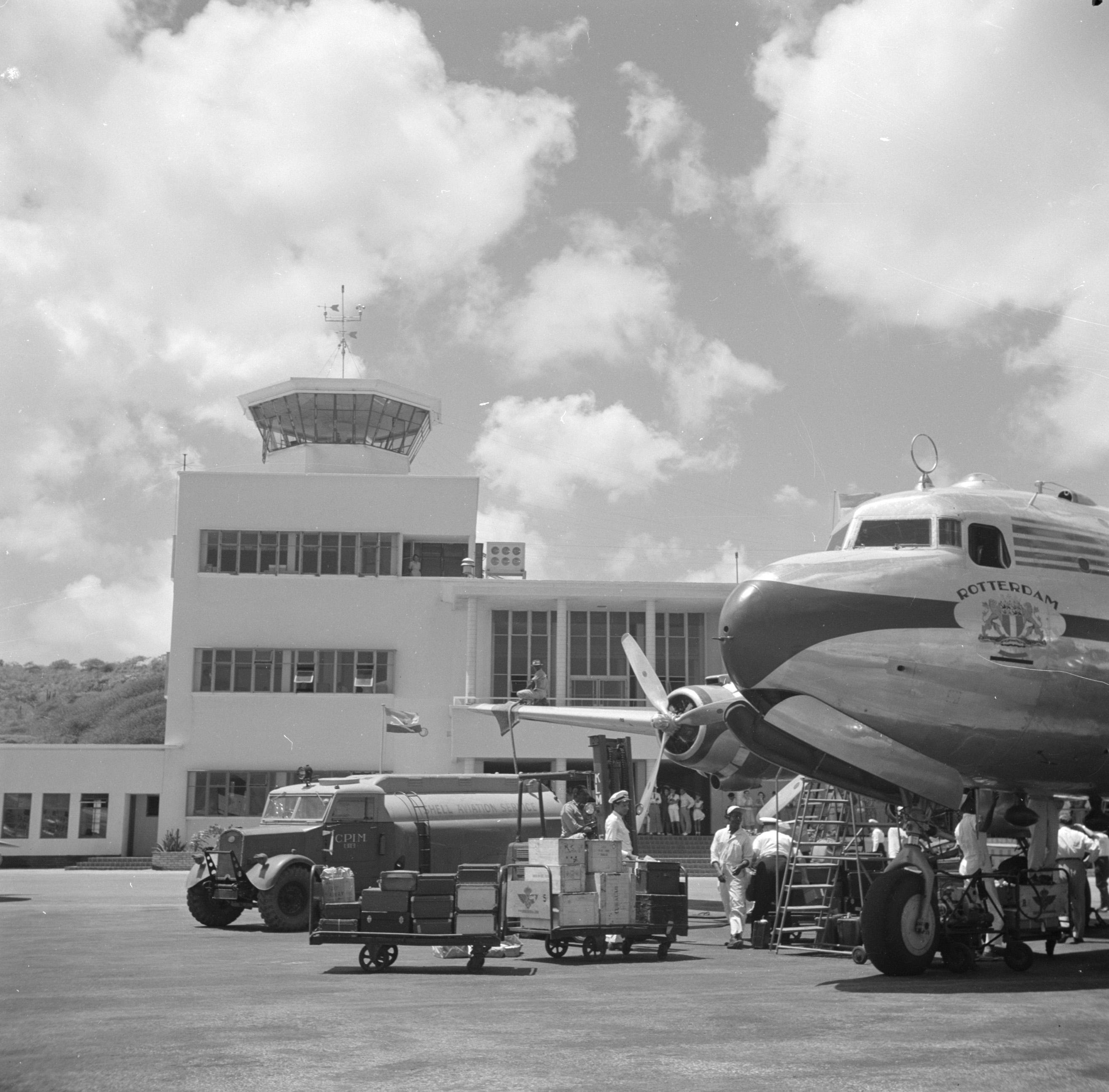
The original tower

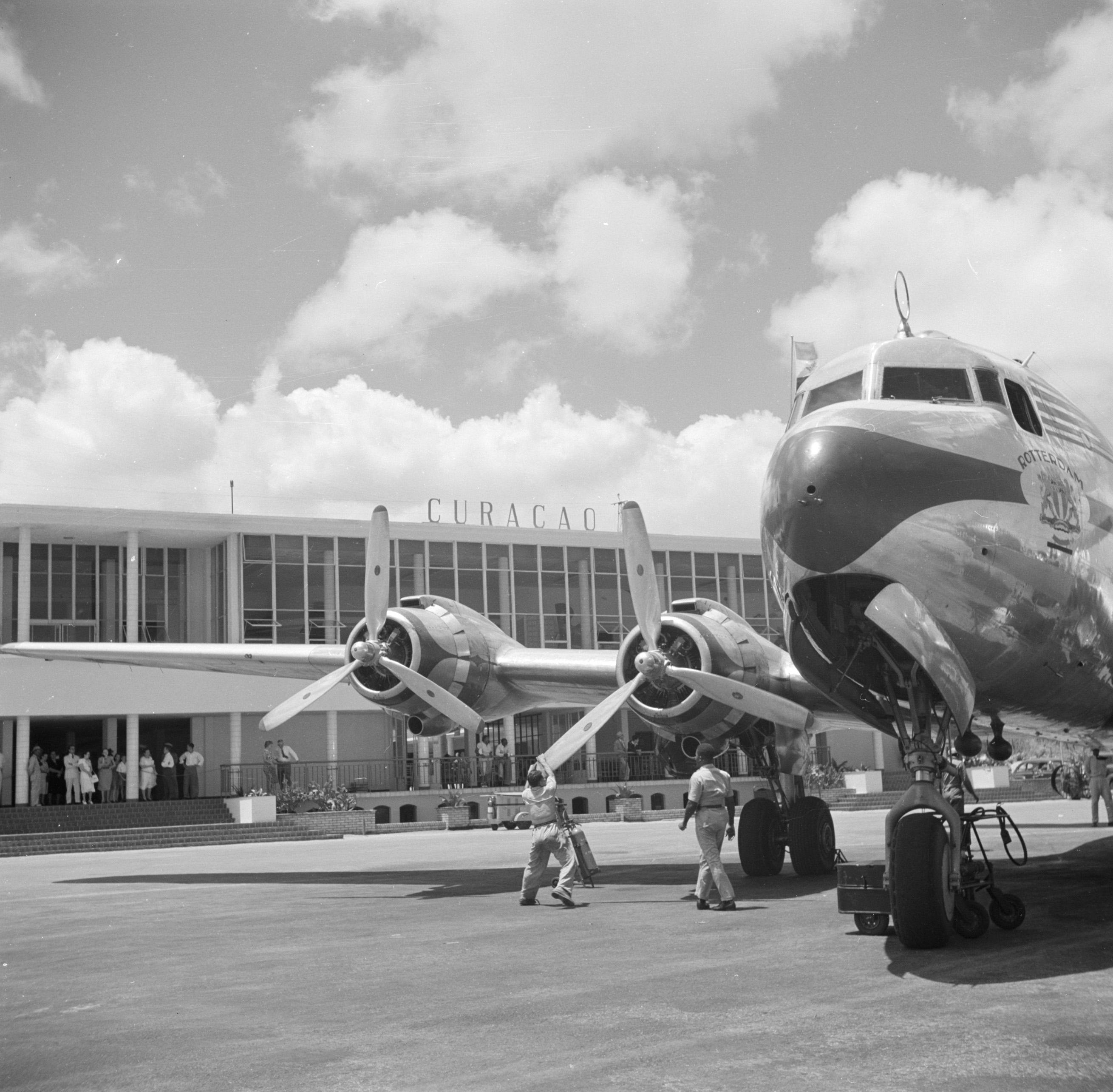
The old departure terminal

=== Foundation and early years ===
The airport was initially called Hato Airport, namesake of the nearby town of Hato. On 5 January 1954, the airport was renamed Dr. Albert Plesman airport. Plesman, director of the Royal Dutch Airlines for the Netherlands and Colonies, had died a few days earlier. Often it was spoken of Aeropuerto Plesman or ,Plesman Airport, un; unofficially,o the name Hato remained in use till this day. Nowadays, the official name is Curaçao International Airport.

Albert Plesman, director of KLM, said, "It will be unnecessary to set out in detail, of which it is of paramount importance, that the Dutch aviation industry gets a firm footing in the vicinity of the Caribbean sea, where air traffic is now becoming more and more a factor of economic significance." With this argument, in March 1934, Plesman hoped to receive financial support from the Comité Vliegtocht Nederland-Indië. It was a new plan to head to the West. In the 1920s, it started to take an interest in the Caribbean region. Curaçao was developing itself in a beneficial way due to the presence of the oil refinery, and a growing number of people were starting to choose the region with the purpose of vacationing. Aviation companies were paying close attention to these developments and were researching if it was possible to create a connection between the United States, Curaçao, and South America. The West Indische Government constructed a runway at the Hato plantation in Curaçao,

On 22 December 1934, the Snip plane arrived in Curaçao after an 8th day during a trip with the route Amsterdam-Marseille-Alicante-Casablanca-Porto Praia-Paramaribo-La Guaria-Curaçao.

=== 1940s – World War II ===
Hato was one of the most important and busiest airports in the Caribbean during the Second World War. The airport was used by the United States Army Air Forces Sixth Air Force for patrols against submarines. Flying units using the airfield were:

- 59th Bombardment Squadron (VI Bomber Command), 10 March 1942 – 13 July 1943 (A-20 Havoc)
- 32d Fighter Squadron (36th Fighter Group, Antilles Air Command, XXVI Fighter Command), 9 March 1943 – 13 March 1944 (P-40 Warhawk)
- Detachment operated from: Dakota Field, Aruba, 9 March 1943 – 9 March 1944
- Detachment operated from: Losey Army Airfield, Puerto Rico, 9 March – 4 June 1944
- 25th Bombardment Group (VI Bomber Command), 1 August – 5 October 1943

=== 1960s ===
During the 1960s, the 'Bestuurscollege' commissioned Netherlands Airport Consultants B.V. (NACO) to design a Master plan for the airport. This assignment was in connection with the expected arrival of the Boeing 747. The runway was extended and the first KLM 'Jumbo' arrived on 6 November 1971, with the Boeing 747-200 ‘Mississippi’.

=== Organisational development ===
Curaçao International Airport N.V. (Curinta) was founded in 1977 and operated the Airport until 2013. Its predecessor was the 'Luchthavenbedrijf' (airport company), which was a department of the Government of Curaçao. After 2013, a public-private partnership was founded. The Curaçao Airport Holding (CAH) is owned by the government, and CAH owns the airport and 450 hectares (1100 acres) of land around it. The CAH acts as the supervisor of the Curaçao Airport Partners (CAP) who has a 30-year concession to operate and develop the airport. The CAP is a consortium of Zürich Airport (Switzerland), Janssen de Jong (the Netherlands) and CCR (Brazil).

=== 2010s ===
In the 2010s, renovations and expansions were started so the airport could host more passengers. The runway and taxiway were renovated, a plaza was opened with catering and retail, and the old terminal was demolished. A new departure hall took its place. It is fully air-conditioned with a system using cold seawater. The airport receives about 3,300 private jets and airplanes yearly. A dedicated terminal or jet center was opened to efficiently handle VIPS and artists at large events and to be ready for even more private passengers in the future.

== Airlines and destinations ==
=== Passenger ===
Airlines	Destinations
Aerolíneas Argentinas	Seasonal: Buenos Aires–Ezeiza (begins 2 January 2027)
Air Canada Rouge	Toronto–Pearson; Seasonal: Montréal–Trudeau
Air Century	Santo Domingo–La Isabela
Albatros Airlines	Charter: Las Piedras
American Airlines	Charlotte, Miami; Seasonal: Chicago–O'Hare
Arajet	Santo Domingo–Las Américas
Avianca	Bogotá
Avior Airlines	Caracas
Azul Brazilian Airlines	Seasonal: Belo Horizonte–Confins
Caribbean Airlines	Port of Spain
Copa Airlines	Panama City–Tocumen
Corendon Airlines	Seasonal: Düsseldorf (begins 14 December 2026)
Corendon Dutch Airlines	Amsterdam, Bonaire
Delta Air Lines	Atlanta
Divi Divi Air	Aruba, Bonaire
JetBlue	New York–JFK
KLM	Amsterdam
LASER Airlines	Caracas
TUI fly Netherlands	Amsterdam
United Airlines	Newark
WestJet	Seasonal: Toronto–Pearson
Winair	Aruba, Bonaire, Sint Maarten
Wingo	Seasonal: Bogotá, Medellín–JMC
Z Air	Aruba, Barranquilla, Bonaire, Medellín–JMC, Sint Maarten

== Statistics ==
Year	2025	2024	2023	2022	2021	2020	2019
Passengers handled	2,461,000	2,117,605	1,707,889	1,465,061	830,145	548,000	1,450,410

Top 10 busiest routes out of Curaçao International Airport (2018)
Rank	Country	Passengers	% total	% change	Airlines
1	Netherlands	177.042	41,0%	▲11,0%	KLM, TUI fly Netherlands
2	United States	73.259	17,0%	▲20,0%	American Airlines, Delta Air Lines, JetBlue, United Airlines
3	Colombia	23.593	5,5%	▲38,0%	Avianca, Copa Airlines
4	Canada	21.169	4,9%	▲11,0%	Air Canada, Sunwing Airlines, WestJet
5	Germany	18.536	4,3%	▼10,0%	Condor
6	Venezuela	16.081	3,7%	▼44,0%	Albatros Airlines, Avior Airlines, LASER Airlines
7	Aruba	14.060	3,3%	▲13,0%	Aruba Airlines, Divi Divi Air, EZAir
8	Brazil	13.229	3,1%	▲23,0%	Avianca, Wingo
9	Suriname	8.458	2,0%	▲9,0%	Fly All Ways, Surinam Airways
10	Belgium	7.400	1,7%	▲12,0%	TUI fly Belgium

Top 10 airlines at CUR (2022)
Rank	Airline	Passenger share	Destinations
1	KLM	29%	Amsterdam
2	TUI fly Netherlands	19%	Amsterdam
3	American Airlines	13%	Charlotte, Miami
4	Divi Divi Air	8%	Kralendijk, Oranjestad
5	EZAir	6%	Barranquilla, Kralendijk, Medellín, Oranjestad
6	Avianca	5%	Bogotá
7	Jetair Caribbean	5%	Kingston, Medellín, Philipsburg, Port-au-Prince, Santo Domingo
8	Copa Airlines	4%	Panama City
9	JetBlue	3%	New York
10	Wingo	2%	Bogotá

== Coast Guard Air Station Hato ==
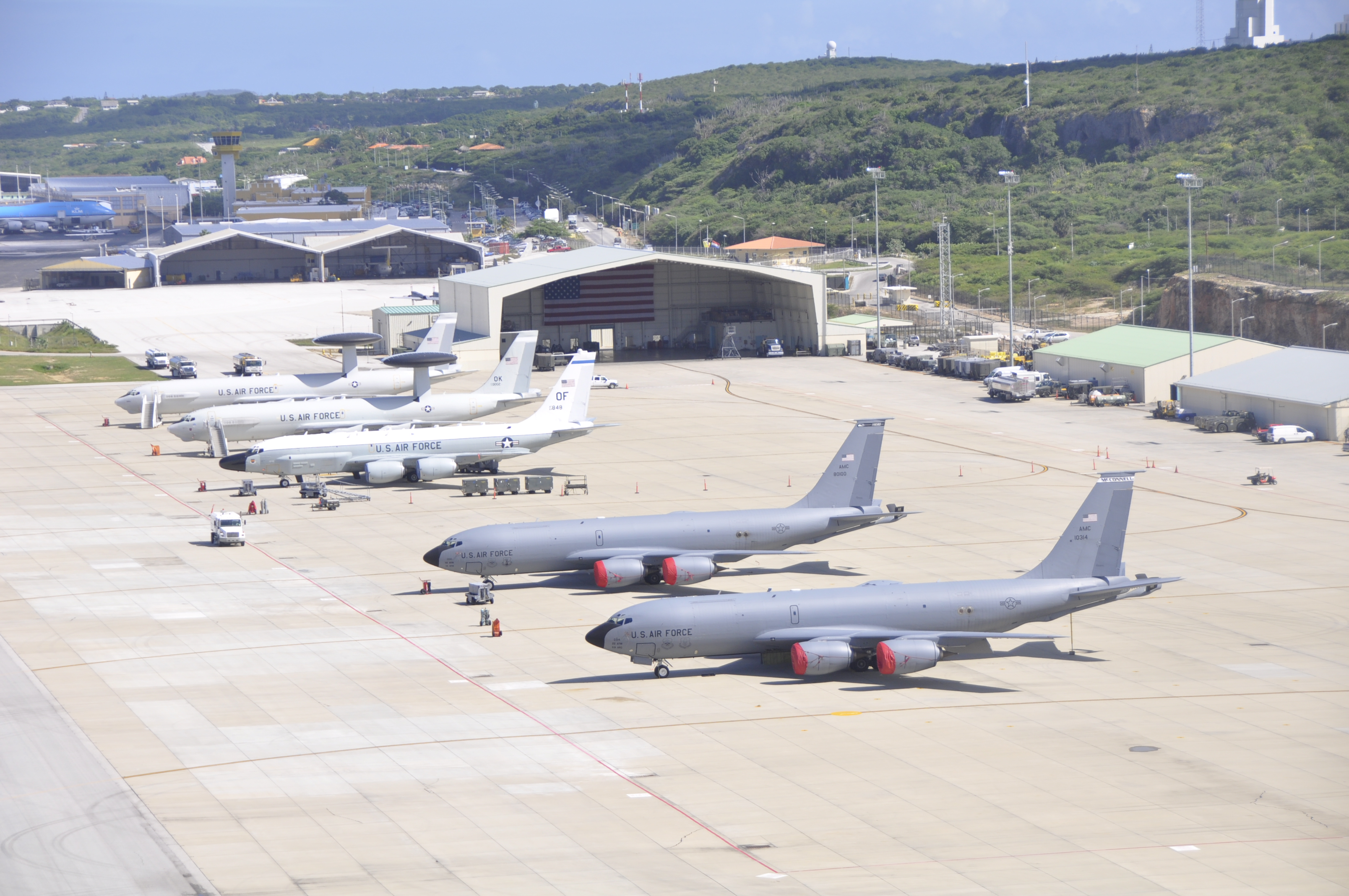
United States Air Force flight-line at Forward Operating Location (FOL) Curaçao, Hato International Airport, 21 January 2011.

Located on the west side of Hato Airport are hangars for the two Bombardier Dash 8 Maritime Patrol Aircraft and two AgustaWestland AW139 helicopters of the Dutch Caribbean Coast Guard. This was, until 2007, a naval airbase of the Royal Netherlands Navy, which operated the base for 55 years. With a wide variety of aircraft in the past years, Fireflies, Avengers, Trackers, Neptunes, Fokker F-27's, P-3C Orions, Fokker F-60's and several helicopters. After the political decision to sell all Orions, the airbase was no longer needed.

The west end of the airport is a USAF Forward Operating Base (FOB). The base hosts AWACS and transport aircraft. Until 1999, the USAF operated a small fleet of F-16 fighters from the FOB.
