= Flamingo International Airport =

Flamingo International Airport Bonaire International Airport
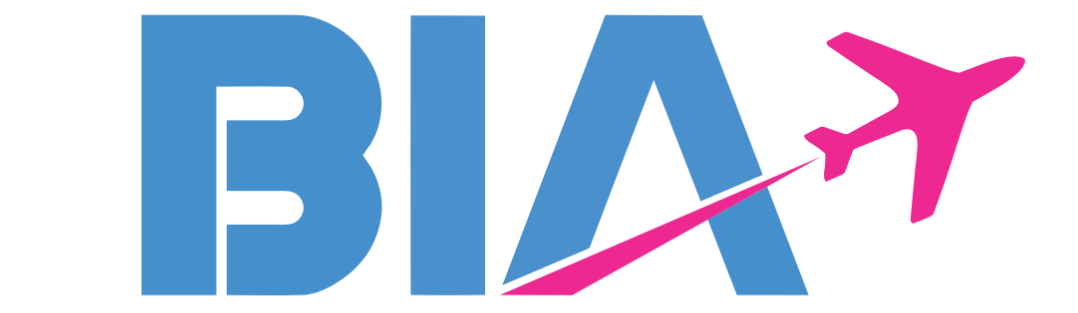

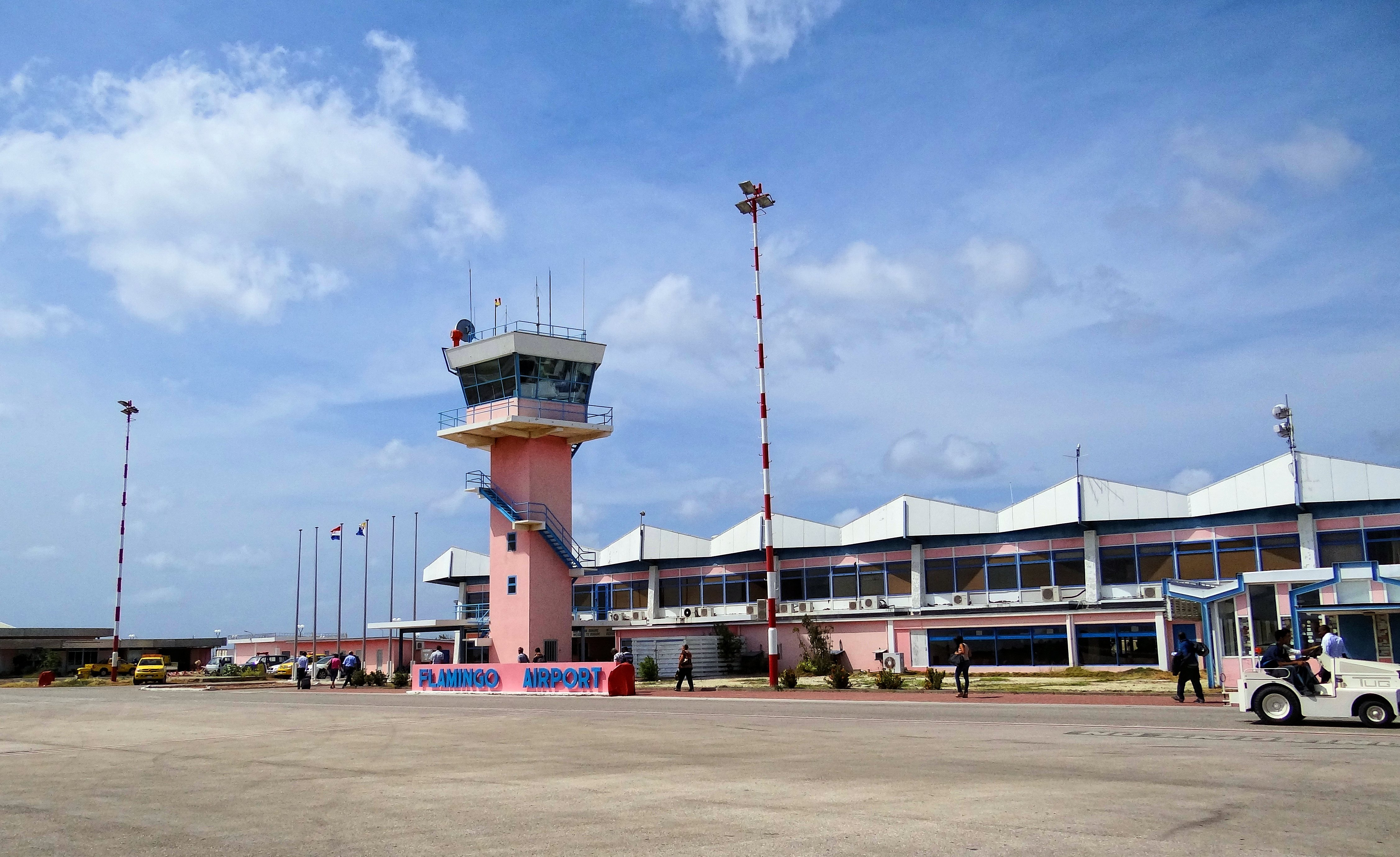
- IATA: BON; ICAO: TNCB

Summary
- Airport type: Public
- Owner: Government
- Operator: Bonaire International Airport N.V.
- Serves: Bonaire
- Location: Kralendijk, Bonaire, Caribbean Netherlands
- Hub for: Z Air
- Focus city for: Divi Divi Air
- Elevation AMSL: 20 ft (6.1 m)
- Coordinates: 12°07′52″N 068°16′07″W
- Website: bonaireinternationalairport.com

Map
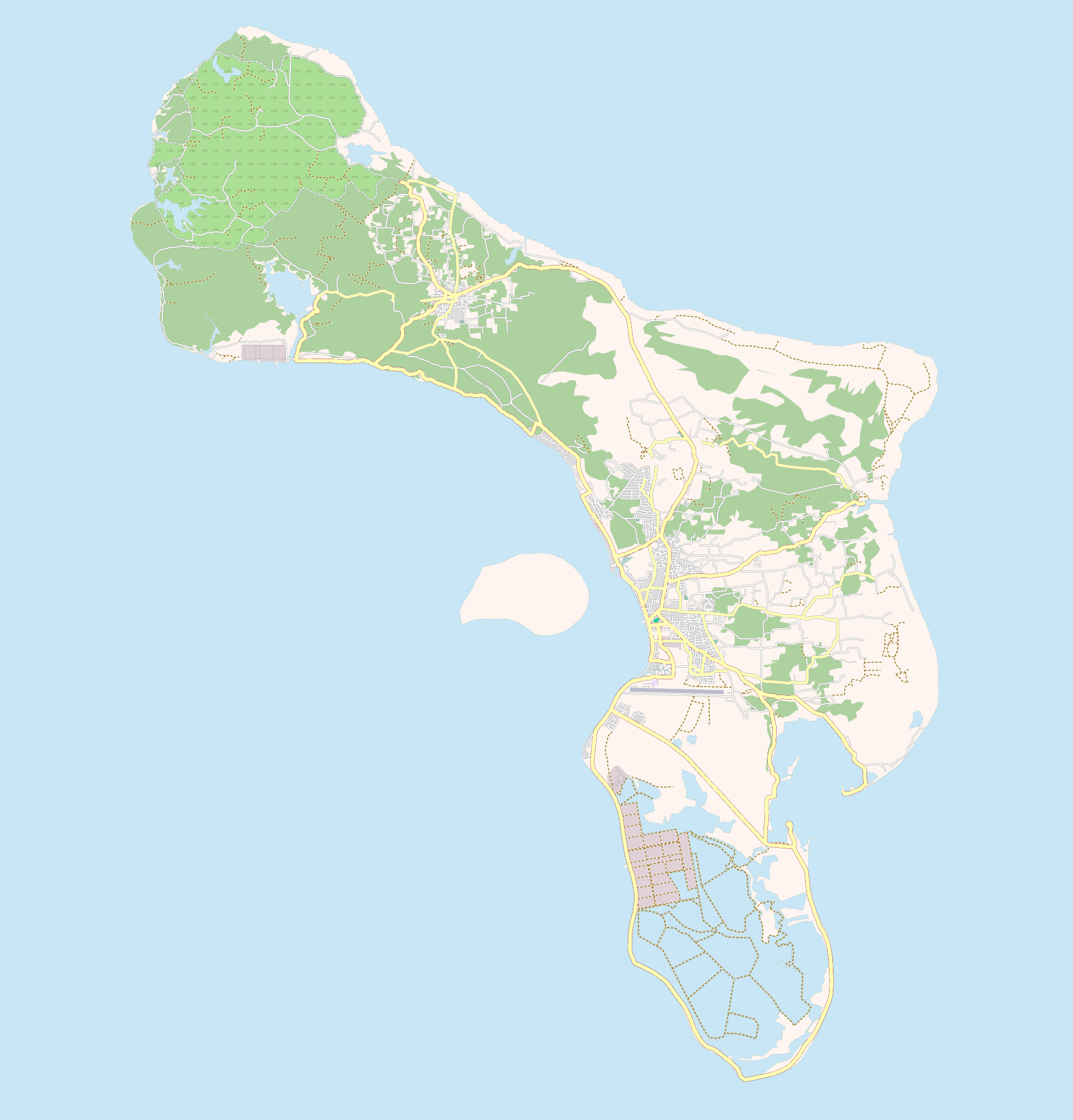
- Location in Bonaire

Runways
Direction	Length		Surface
Direction	m	ft	Surface
10/28	2,880	9,449	Asphalt

Statistics (2010)
- Aircraft operations: 20,001
- Passengers: 462,897
- Sources: DAFIF; Statistics from Bonaire International Airport

Flamingo International Airport (IATA: BON, ICAO: TNCB), also called Bonaire International Airport (BIA), is an international airport located near Kralendijk on the island of Bonaire in the Caribbean Netherlands. It was once the hub for BonaireExel and CuraçaoExel before they were rebranded as Dutch Antilles Express, and served as a secondary hub for Dutch Antilles Express and Insel Air. The airport is the fourth largest in the Dutch Caribbean, after Queen Beatrix International Airport on Aruba, Princess Juliana International Airport on Sint Maarten and Curaçao International Airport on Curaçao and is now the largest airport in the Caribbean Netherlands, with F. D. Roosevelt Airport in Sint Eustatius being the second largest and Juancho E. Yrausquin Airport in Saba being the smallest.

American Airlines, Delta Air Lines, KLM, TUI Airlines Netherlands and United Airlines are currently the largest airlines that operate scheduled flights to and from Bonaire. Beginning on November 5, 2024, JetBlue Airways started serving the island as well. The airport is capable of handling wide-body aircraft up to the Boeing 747, though the largest type to operate to Bonaire currently is the Airbus A350-900, operated by Corendon Dutch Airlines. The airport is currently a hub for Z Air and once served as a hub for BonaireExel/BonaireExpress, CuracaoExel/Curacao Express, Dutch Antilles Express and KLM. It also serves as a focus city for Divi Divi Air and also served for the aforementioned Dutch Antilles Express prior to ceasing operations, as well as Air ALM, Dutch Caribbean Airlines and Insel Air.

== History ==
Bonaire's first airport was located near Tra'i Montaña near Subi Blanku and crossed the current road from Kralendijk to Rincon. It was only a landing strip and a shelter. It was built in 1936 and is considered the location of the beginning of aviation on Bonaire.

The construction work for this airport began on September 23, 1935. The intention was to make a longer runway, but it proved impossible to construct more than 475 meters because the eastern portion of the land was very low. Part of the field had to be modified, in particular where aircraft met or left the ground during landing and take-off. This area covered more than 100 metres of the runway, and had to be paved with a mixture of sand and stone.

KLM decided on May 9, 1936, to route-test the first flight to Bonaire from Curaçao. The Oriol (Fokker F-XVIII "Snip") was chosen for this test. The first experimental landing was successful and also a historic moment. KLM made the first official flight with passengers on May 31, 1936.

American soldiers arrived on Bonaire in the second half of 1943 and their commander stated that a new airport had to be built. In December 1943, construction began in the vicinity of where the airport is today. The new airport, named "Flamingo Airport", was put into use in 1945. This was a big step forward for Bonaire and its aviation. A small terminal was built that was suitable for the number of passengers at the time. This building was used until 1976.

The construction of a new runway began in the last months of 1953 and was completed in 1955. The small terminal had been extended with a terrace where luggage could be delivered. The runway was extended and expanded several times. In 1960, the runway had a length of 1,430 meters and a width of 30 meters. Hotels and interested parties on the island continued to push for a further extension of the runway so that charter flights from the United States were able to land here. Those flights were typically operated with McDonnell Douglas DC-8 or Boeing 707 aircraft.

In 1970 the runway was extended to a length of 1,750 meters and a width of 30 meters, enough for a McDonnell Douglas DC-9 to land and take off fully loaded. On June 7, 1974, a public tender for the construction of a new terminal building was made. The building became operational in 1976. Meanwhile, hotels and foreign investors continued to insist that the runway be extended further. This was needed before any more hotels could be built. In 1980 the runway was again extended to 2,400 meters long and 45 meters wide, and in October 2000 another extension was carried out, resulting in the current runway length of 2,880 meters to facilitate the largest airliners on intercontinental flights.

The Dutch national carrier, KLM, used the airport to refuel planes en route from Amsterdam to Ecuador and Peru, using MD-11 and Boeing 747 between 1997 and 2011.

== Airport information and facilities ==
=== Overview ===
The first Bonaire-Miami flight took place on April 19, 1980, which was permitted due to the runway extension of that year. The current runway of 2880m is long enough for flights to Europe with a maximum take-off weight. KLM began with flights to Peru and later to Ecuador with a fuel stop on Bonaire in 2002. In recent years, the facilities at the airport have been modernized and expanded. There is a new departure hall, a new platform for wide body aircraft and a fuel farm. As of 2009, Flamingo Airport is a full service stop for transit flights and the destination for many tourist flights, with air-conditioned offices, a restaurant, a departure hall and stores.

The airport registered a more than 10% increase in passengers in the first quarter of 2008. The increase has much to do with the Delta and Continental Airlines flights. Compared to the same period last year also the local passengers increased by 10.6%. International traffic increased by 8.8% which is breakthrough for the airport.

Pennsylvania-based Interspace Airport Advertising, through its subsidiary, Interspace Airport Advertising Curaçao, N.V., created the new terminal-wide advertising display program. Interspace will also manage the program through a 10-year partnership with the airport authority.

The airport has two main ramps. The smaller ramp, which is situated in front of the airport building, consists of 4 Parking Positions (PP1, PP2, PP3 and PP4) and is mainly used by smaller operating aircraft such as those of Divi Divi, EZAir, and Insel Air, as well as private aircraft with short ground times, along with the larger Delta, United and Arkefly aircraft when the larger apron is in use by another large aircraft. The larger ramp is used for wide bodied aircraft such as KLM and Arkefly, but is also used by United, Delta and Insel Air when vacant. The larger ramp consist of two parking spots (PP5 and PP6). The management of the airport is currently working on the apron to allow two wide-bodied aircraft to park alongside each other, with the use of pushback cars, when ready for departure. At the beginning of the runway lies the General Aviation ramp, where mostly private aircraft are located. Due to overcrowding of the GA Ramp, some private aircraft utilize the larger ramp at PP6 to park when overnighting and long stays.

In the past, the airport has been served by Air ABC, Air ALM, Air Aruba, Air Europe (Italy), Air Jamaica, American Eagle (Executive Airlines), Avensa, Avior Airlines, BonAir/Chapi Air, Bonaire Express/Curaçao Express (later Dutch Antilles Express), Canada 3000, Cats Air, Dutch Caribbean Airlines, E-Liner Airways, Insel Air, Kavok Airlines, LASER Airlines, Línea Turística Aereotuy, Martinair, Miami Air International, Rainbow Air, Royal Aruban Airlines, Servivensa, Sobelair, Surinam Airways (currently operates seasonal charters), Tiara Air and Transaven.

Both BonAeroClub and Falki Aviation Center offers sightseeing opportunities and also flight lessons with their fleets of Cessna 172's.

=== Parking system and charges ===
In May 2008, the parking places at Flamingo Airport were renovated. The airport introduced short and long-term paid parking. Financial manager Gerard Chin-A-Lien indicated that the project will cost US$2.1 million. Most of this money will be spent on paving, installing the automatic parking system, landscaping, and lighting. This service officially started on 5 September 2008. It is not possible to drop off passengers for free since August 2009 as you have to pay 1 guilder for the first 30 minutes and 1 guilder for each 30 minutes after that with a maximum of 20 guilders per day. Long parking costs 10 guilders per day. According to security manager Tico Wanga, a lot of attention is paid to safety with sufficient lights and cameras everywhere, and patrolling security personnel.

=== Check-in system and airport tax fee ===
In October 2008, Bonaire introduced a Common Use Terminal Equipment system from SITA. This is a common use system whereby all airlines can use each of the 12 available check-in counters at Flamingo Airport. More flexibility is obtained while the processing capacity of passengers at the check-in counters is increased and made more efficient. The older check-in system worked with so-called dedicated check-in counters which were usable by only one particular airline and could not be used by other airlines, thus restricting processing capacity.

Due to the introduction of this new system, Bonaire International Airport began charging each departing passenger a service charge, starting December 1, 2008. This service charge amounts to 3.00 guilders (about US$1.69) and is added to the existing passenger facility charge (airport tax). As of October 2010, all airport taxes have been integrated within all purchased tickets for all airlines.

== Plans ==
It is planned to expand the current airport building, including the current arrival and departure hall, as more airlines and tourists come to Bonaire. It is also planned to repair the airport's runway after certain speculations that the runway had a crack in it. The Dutch Transport Minister, Camiel Eurlings, calculates that it will cost about €20 million (57 million guilders) to repair the airport's worn-out runway.

The management of the airport is drawing up a master plan to comply with international requirements. There are three important projects planned which include:

1. Maintenance and complete renovation of the runway, as mentioned above (completed in 2011),
2. Moving the fire station to the middle of the runway (completed in 2016),
3. Purchasing two push-back cars for the heavy jets (One already purchased and in-use with KLM flights)

In 2008, Bonaire International Airport began realizing its 15-year master plan, which was adopted by the island government in 2009, and Phase 1 (complete runway renovation) was completed in 2011. Phase 2A included the construction of a new Air Traffic Control Tower, which is now completed. Phase 2B will bring a new apron and two taxiways to the runway. Phase 3 will be a new passenger terminal. Phases 2B and 3 are planned to be conducted simultaneously. Currently, additional scenarios are also being reviewed.

Work on the new Rescue & Fire Fighting Station began on October 9, 2014, and was officially introduced in 2016, while the new control tower was finalized in 2017. The old control tower was torn down in mid-2017.

Although a new passenger terminal and apron were in plans to be built, the airport has opted to work on the current building by expanding the departure hall due to the growth in passenger movements in recent years. The current departure hall will be almost doubled in size to handle 500 instead of 300 passengers per hour. Although work is being done on the departure hall only, plans include expansion of the arrival as well, depending on the airport's ability to be able to pay for the expenses.

== Airlines and destinations ==
While not connected globally, Bonaire is served year-round service by airlines from the Caribbean, the Netherlands and the United States, as well as seasonal direct services from Canada. Private aircraft also serve the island of Bonaire. The following airlines operate regular scheduled and seasonal services to and from Bonaire:

Airlines	Destinations
Air Century	Seasonal: Santo Domingo–La Isabela
American Airlines	Miami
Corendon Dutch Airlines	Amsterdam, Curaçao
Delta Air Lines	Atlanta
Divi Divi Air	Curaçao
KLM	Amsterdam, Aruba
Sky High	Santo Domingo–Las Americas
TUI fly Netherlands	Amsterdam, Curaçao
United Airlines	Houston–Intercontinental, Newark
WestJet	Seasonal: Toronto–Pearson
Winair	Curaçao, Sint Maarten
Z Air	Aruba, Curaçao

Notes

- ^1 Corendon Dutch Airlines flights will operate from Amsterdam to Bonaire via Curaçao. However, the airline will not have cabotage rights to transport passengers solely between Bonaire and Curaçao. The flight will continue from Bonaire to Amsterdam directly.
- ^2 KLM flights operate from Amsterdam to Bonaire via Aruba. However, the airline does not have cabotage rights to transport passengers solely between Aruba and Bonaire. The flight continues from Bonaire to Amsterdam directly.
- ^3 TUI fly Netherlands flights operate to and from Amsterdam to Bonaire via Curaçao on selected days. However, the airline does not have cabotage rights to transport passengers solely between Bonaire and Curaçao.
- ^4 Winair operates flights from and to Sint Maarten but both flights have a stopover Curaçao. Certain flights are operated directly to Sint Maarten on occasion.

== Statistics ==
=== Annual statistics ===
This is a table of annual statistics at the airport since 2000.

Type of traffic	2000	2001	2002	2003	2004	2005	2006	2007	2008	2009
Passenger movements	314,152	276,185	371,805	573,487	536,651	552,417	422,361	394,833	487,212	458,437
Cargo (tons)	370	345	477	760	715	416	274	319	355	414
Total movements	9,684	9,981	13,525	18,195	15,922	15,900	11,836	11,389	16,908	20,993

== Runway and approach ==
The single runway 10/28 is 2,880 m × 45 m (9,449 ft × 148 ft). The actual heading is 92° or 272°. For runway 10 a Simple Approach Landing System is in place, for runway 28 no visual approach aids are available. Lighting of runway complies with all current regulations and back-up power system is available.

Reported/official runway-dimensions:

See for explanation of used terms article on runway

Runway	TORA	ASDA	TODA	LDA	Obstructions	Strip dimensions
10	2880	2880	3020	2780	none	3000x150
28	2880	2880	3030	2880	none	3000x150

Flamingo International Airport operates a Non-directional beacon on 321 kHz and a VHF Omnidirectional Range on 115 MHz

== General aviation facilities ==
=== Catering ===
Apart from the passenger terminal Bonaire Airport has facilities for freight and mail. Catering is available since Goddard Catering opened an airline kitchen on the island in 2003 offering complete airline catering. The Aruba kitchen uses ready-made imported frozen hot meals and locally made salads and appetizers. Since March 31, 2015, Goddard Catering has closed down its operations in Bonaire as KLM made a decision to move all of its catering services to Aruba.

=== Ground handling ===
Three local ground handlers operate at Bonaire airport.

- Air Handling Service Bonaire (also known as AHS or AHSB), is the ground handling agent for Delta Air Lines, Insel Air, Sky High Aviation Services, United Airlines as of October 2016 and Winair. It was also the agent for American Eagle before they discontinued their flights from and to San Juan and Dutch Antilles Express before halting operations in 2013. They also provide handling services to private jets.
- Bonaire Air Services (also known as BAS), is the ground handling agent for Air France-KLM, American Airlines and TUI Airlines Netherlands (formerly Arkefly/Arke) as well as Sunwing Airlines during their winter season flights as well as some cargo services (such as Amerijet, Aerosucre and Líneas Aéreas Suramericanas). It was also the agent for Air Jamaica prior to their discontinued flight to Bonaire and, United Airlines (formerly known and operated as Continental Airlines). BAS is also the ground handler for charter flights operated by Aerolíneas Estelar, Conviasa, LASER Airlines and Surinam Airways.
- Progressive Air Services (also known as PAS), is currently the ground handling agent for Aruba Airlines and was for Rainbow air, Tiara Air until their discontinued flights and is a partnership with BonAir. Progressive Air Services also provides handling service to various private jets that visit the island as well as cargo services (such as Ameriflight). It was also the ground handling agent for Kavok Airlines and Transaven. PAS was also the ground handler for charter flights operated by Línea Turística Aereotuy.

Swissport also served as one of the cargo and aircraft ground handling services on the island. Swissport was the ground handling agent for Arkefly (Curaçao), DAE (Curaçao) & Insel Air (Curaçao) before the handling of DAE & Insel Air has been later handled by Air Handling Services Bonaire and Arkefly is being handled by Bonaire Air Services.

As of 2018, Bonaire also has services for private aircraft by Bonaire Jet Center' which is part of the CATS Group whom also has services in Cuba, Curacao and Venezuela.

Divi Divi Air and EZAir are the only airlines with their own handling services and employees.

=== Fuel ===
Aviation Jet A1 fuel is available 24 hours a day via Valero Bonaire Fuels Co N.V., owned by Valero Energy Corporation. On-site capacity of the tank-farm consists of two storage tanks of 630,000 gallons each. Every other week jet fuel is delivered to the island via a tanker from their own refinery at Aruba. Valero operates a direct pipeline from their landing-jetty to the airport. Two refueller trucks each with 15.000 gallons and one with 10,000 gallons are available.

=== Emergency equipment ===
The airport is categorized as Fire Category 9 and on-site equipment includes four crashtenders and one rapid-intervention unit.

== Incidents and accidents ==
- On November 3, 2003, a Mitsubishi MU-2 twin-engine turboprop crashed while on final approach after reporting an emergency with its engines. The tower received the message from the pilot, Hans van Gijn, 57, flying aircraft registration number N630HA, reporting engine problems and that ditching in the sea was a possibility. It had departed Bonaire earlier in the day to pick up a medical patient in Aruba for transport to Barranquilla, Colombia. After dropping off the patient and a male nurse in Barranquilla, the plane headed back to Bonaire. Minutes before it was due to land both engines stopped. The powerless plane glided over the shoreline and almost made it to the runway. It appeared that the undercarriage of the plane snagged on the cyclone fence bordering the shore road and flipped over. There was no fire. The plane was completely mangled except for the passenger compartment. The pilot survived and from the wreckage it appeared that he exited through the cockpit door.
- On October 14, 2009, a single-engined private plane exploded in mid-air while flying over Bonaire. Witnesses near the west coast of the island witnessed a ball of fire falling from the sky at around 9 pm. The bodies of the pilot and a passenger were recovered along with bales of drugs. The bodies, aircraft type and drug type have yet to be identified.
- On October 21, 2009, a Britten-Norman Islander BN-2A flight operated by local commuter airline, Divi Divi Air Flight 014 lost an engine while in flight to Bonaire and had to ditch in the sea south-west of Klein Bonaire and five minutes out from Bonaire. Pilot Robert Mansell, 32, managed to successfully ditch the plane in the water but was knocked unconscious on impact. The passengers tried to undo his safety harness, but the plane was sinking too fast and he went down with the aircraft, but rescue boats managed to pick up all of the nine passengers that were on board. The aircraft involved was registered as PJ-SUN
