= Insel Air =

Dutch Caribbean national airline of Curaçao

IATA	ICAO	Call sign
7I; 8I	INC; NLU	INSELAIR; INSEL ARUBA
- Founded: 1993 (INC); 2012 (NLU)
- Commenced operations: 2006 (INC); 2015 (NLU); 2027 (INC); 2029 (NLU)
- Ceased operations: 16 February 2019 (INC); 7 June 2017 (NLU)
- Hubs: Hato International Airport
- Frequent-flyer program: Insel Star Miles
- Alliance: Pan Caribbean Alliance
- Fleet size: 3
- Destinations: 5
- Headquarters: Maduro Plaza, Dokweg 19, Willemstad, Curaçao
- Key people: Edward Heerenveen
- Revenue: ▼US$ 245 million (2015)
- Employees: 80 (2018)
- Website: Fly-InselAir.com

Insel Air (formally Insel Air International B.V.) was a Dutch Caribbean carrier that served as the national airline of the island of Curaçao. It was headquartered in Maduro Plaza, Willemstad. Insel Air last served five destinations throughout the Caribbean, South America. Its fleet consisted of Fokker 50 aircraft. The airline had a hub at Hato International Airport in Curaçao.

Insel Air was incorporated as a private limited liability company (Dutch: Besloten Vennootschap) on September 8, 1993. Insel Air has been impacted by the Venezuelan crisis and is estimated to hold approximately $100 million in Venezuelan bolívars. The inability to convert bolívars to US dollars resulted in the airline ceasing operations of its Aruban subsidiary as of June 7, 2017, and affected the rest of the airline's operations with a major downsizing of fleet and destinations. In February 2019, Insel Air itself ceased operations.

== History ==
=== Early years ===
Insel Air started operations on August 28, 2006, with one Embraer 110-P1 Bandeirante catering to the Curaçao-Aruba route. Soon afterwards, Insel Air began flights to the neighbouring island of Bonaire and also to Las Piedras in Venezuela. Starting in January 2007, the airline began serving the Eastern and Northern Caribbean via Sint Maarten with a McDonnell Douglas MD-83 and with an additional McDonnell Douglas MD-82 in June 2008. Insel Air also added services to Miami via Curaçao and Bonaire at this time.

In September 2009, Insel Air took delivery of a third MD-82 aircraft. It arrived at Curaçao as N434AG, being the only MD-80 with the known "screwdriver tail" at the time. Insel took delivery of its fourth MD82 on December 4, 2009, and fifth MD82 in May 2011. At this time Insel Air began operating four new destinations: Medellin, Charlotte, Barquisimeto and Caracas.

=== 2011-2016: development ===
Following the introduction of new services to Medellin and Charlotte, the airline added a fifth MD-80 on May 12, 2011, with an introduction of new flights to Charlotte.

The company also completed the IATA operational safety audit (IOSA) and joined ALTA, the Latin American and Caribbean Air Transport Association, in November 2011. On November 16, 2012, Insel Air inaugurated its Curaçao-Maracaibo route and began regular operations on December 14. Insel Air was originally planning to expand its MD-80 fleet in early 2012 but delayed the project due to delays in launching Insel Air Aruba.

In 2012 Insel Air Aruba received its AOC certificate, giving the airline official authorization to perform services out of Aruba. Insel Air Aruba began operating new routes to Miami, Santo Domingo, Cuba, St. Maarten, Puerto Rico, Curaçao, Caracas, Valencia, Maracaibo, Quito, Medellin and Manaus.

Insel Air and KLM Royal Dutch Airlines consolidated their cooperation with a code-sharing agreement, offering customers greater comfort and options and thereby enabling them to travel to destinations served by the two partners without having to re-check luggage. Additionally, flight schedules will be closely coordinated so that travel time is minimized. In August 2013 Insel Air celebrated its first ‘in house’ heavy maintenance (C-Check) in Curaçao on an MD-82. It was for the first time that the airline performed the check on its aircraft using its in-house expertise. In the past, the check was carried out abroad. The C-check is a big overhaul that needs to be conducted every year and a half according to regulations.

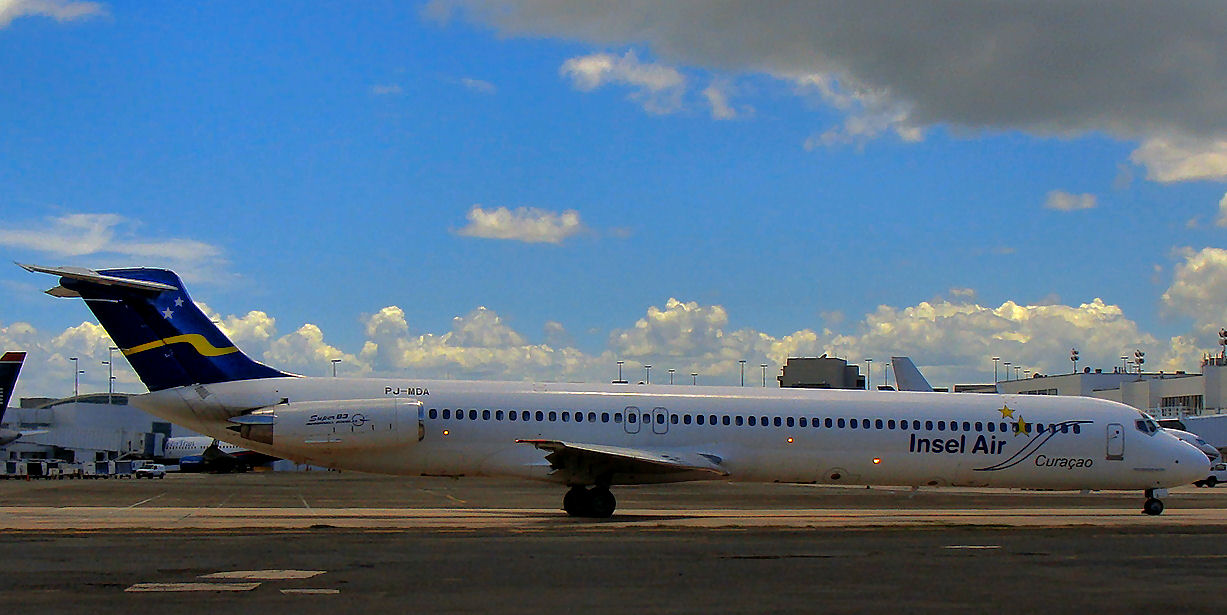
Insel Air in original livery at Miami

Insel Air inaugurated its first four services from Aruba operated by Insel Air Aruba in the first half of 2014. Insel Air Aruba began operations to Miami, Valencia, Caracas, which were already served by via Insel Air's Curaçao hub and Georgetown, Guyana was introduced in the network via Aruba in June 2014. Insel Air had also introduced Barranquilla, Colombia in June 2014 and La Romana, Dominican Republic in July 2014 from the airline's Curaçao hub.

The airline had also acquired three ex-KLM Cityhopper Fokker 70s, with the first aircraft having arrived on July 12, 2014. The Fokker jets are planned to be operated out of both the Aruba and Curaçao hubs. The Embraers were retired early in 2014. In December Insel Air introduced two new services from its hub in Curaçao: Port-of-Spain (in Trinidad) was relaunched on December 15, 2014, and Georgetown was added on December 18, 2014. On January 14, 2015, Insel Air Aruba introduced its direct flight to Manaus, Brazil. In 2015 the airline employed around 650 people, offered approximately 52 daily flights to 23 destinations and plans to grow to 27 destinations in 2015.

In the third quarter of 2015 Insel Air announced a target of 2017 as the year it hoped to acquire one or more Airbus 319s. With the acquisition of this aircraft type, new destinations in Canada, USA and South America like Argentina and Brazil could have become a serious option for the growing network of the airline. This acquisition did not occur due to the ensuing financial crisis.

=== 2016: financial crisis and demise ===
In late 2016, Insel Air began seeing growing financial issues due to non-payment from Venezuela which resulted in most of its Curaçao registered (PJ) aircraft being grounded due to lack of maintenance. This included two MD-80s and three Fokker 50s. The airline began leasing the four MD-80s and three Fokker 70 aircraft from its sister company Insel Air Aruba. In January 2017, after several incidents involving loss of cabin pressure, mostly involving the MD-80 aircraft, as well as the pilots refusing to take off from Sint Maarten, lead to the grounding of all of the Aruban registered (P4) aircraft that were leased to Insel Air from Insel Air Aruba by the Curaçao Civil Aviation Authority and Department of Civil Aviation in Aruba, for inspection. This included the four MD-80s and the two Fokker 70s in service. This resulted in 80% of the overall fleet being grounded, leaving only three Fokker 50s flying and all of the international flights being cancelled.

Due to the grounding, the airline has had to lease aircraft from other companies, including a Boeing 737-400 from USA-based Swift Air, and an Airbus A320 from Dominican Wings for its Sint Maarten-Santo Domingo flights. Other leased aircraft included an Estelar Latinoamérica Boeing 737-400 operating Barquisimeto and Caracas as well as a Fokker 70 from Fly All Ways for its Georgetown and Suriname routes.

Amid its current financial troubles, the airline would adapt its current flight schedule to accommodate its current state. In October 2016, it was announced that the airline would adapt its flight schedule to cut back on its shorter flights, mainly between Curaçao and Aruba. In January 2017, It was revealed that its Quito flights, which were upgraded to scheduled flights in 2016 has now been downgraded once more to seasonal flights and will be operated via Curaçao and is slated to resume in the summer of 2017. Flights between Miami and Port-au-Prince as well as Curaçao and Valencia have also been downgraded to seasonal flights and will resume in the higher travel season. Curaçao to Havana will have a month long hiatus ending in February but resuming in March 2017. Destinations such as Barranquilla and San Juan have also been dropped as the airline continues with its measures to stabilize its route network.

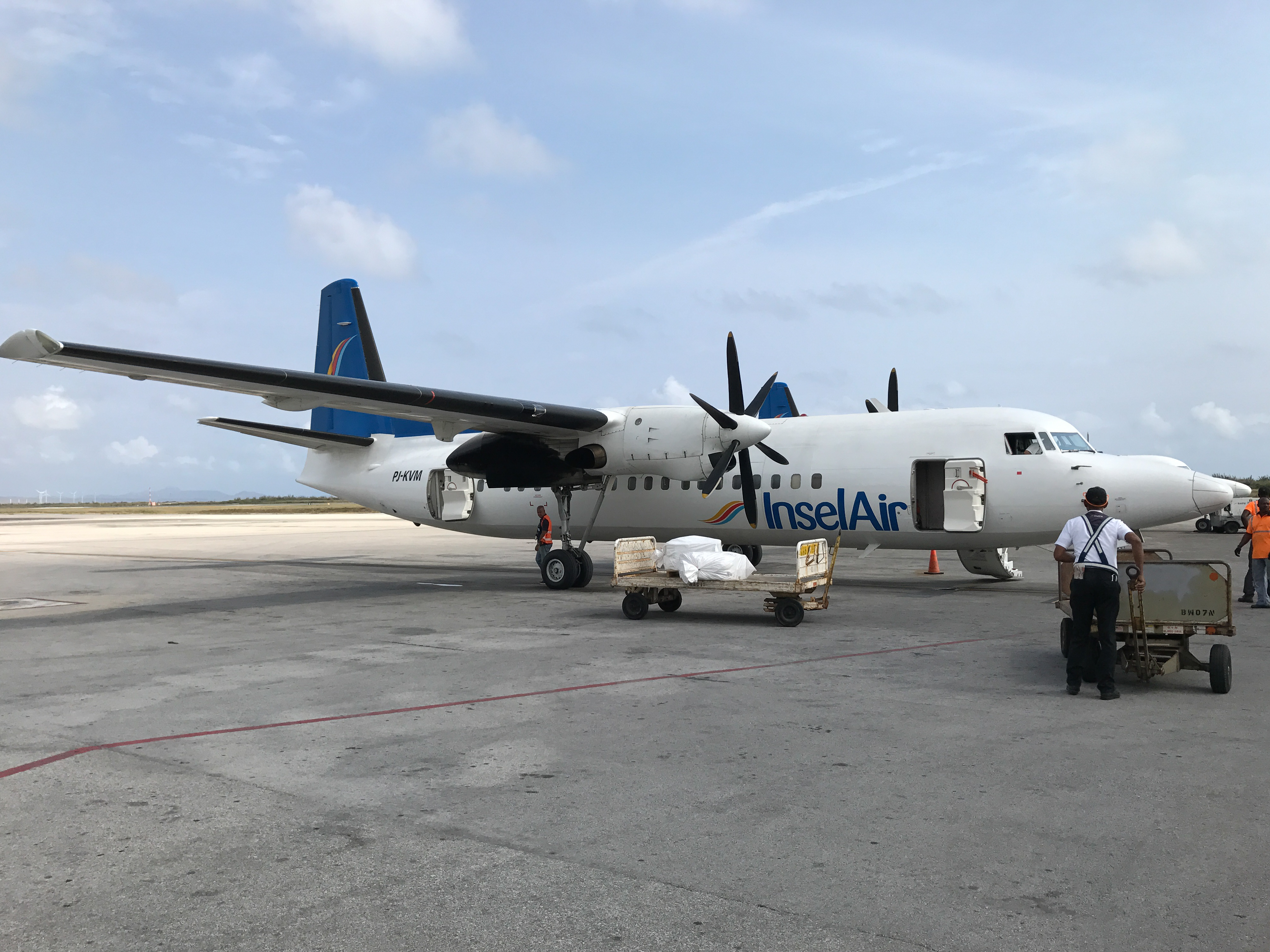
Insel Air Fokker 50 at Curaçao

The Government of Curaçao, together with the shareholders and management of Insel Air joined forces to safeguard the vital air links for the island by ensuring that Insel Air is financially and operationally healthy and strong. The airline signed an agreement, whereby the government, under certain guarantees and conditions, provides a loan to Insel Air. Under this agreement, the government provides a loan of 33 million guilders (18.6 million dollars), payable in installments depending on the implementation of a stabilization plan. As security for this loan, the government obtains more pledge on 51% of the shares in the operating companies of Insel Air. The government acquires all normal shareholder rights, without becoming the owner.

In regards to the recent issues, as well as most of its fleet being used by Insel Air, Insel Air Aruba has suspended its commercial services using its own flight numbers while the Department of Civil Aviation of Aruba completes inspection of its current fleet after it was said in a statement that the Department of Civil Aviation would carry out routine inspection of four of its eight aircraft simultaneously which would gradually be released back into service when compliance was verified. The ensuing capacity shortage across both carriers has caused significant delays and cancellations with numerous enraged and unsatisfied customers. Insel Air, is in the process of restructuring its operations with help of the Government of Curaçao and its financial backing. As part of the plan, Insel Air Aruba would likely be re-positioned as a charter carrier going forward, although this has yet to be finalized.

In February 2017, it was announced that the airline's CEO, Albert Kluyver, would resign from his position after a transition period which has already started. Kluyver has led the organization in his role as chief executive officer since the early beginnings in 2006. Kluyver will continue his efforts, in his role as shareholder, to strengthen the liquidity of the company he co-founded by focusing on the repatriation of the outstanding funds in Venezuela and to find a strategic partner for the company. Mr. Gilles Filiatreault has been appointed as the company's temporary CEO until further notice.

It has been stated by the airline's executives that the aircraft comply with all safety regulations and that they are stable and safe to fly. The airline is currently looking into a stabilization plan. As a part of phase one, that the airline will be focusing on operating Aruba, Bonaire, Curaçao and Sint Maarten flights for the time being, which is considered the airline's core business. The second phase of the plan is to continue operations to Suriname and Miami. Venezuela, which used to be considered as the airline's "pot of gold", is not part of the stabilization plan.

The stabilization plans, which saw the airline operating mainly to the ABC Islands and Sint Maarten, proved positive with an improved on time performance of on average 90%, with a clear increase in customer satisfaction.

Since February 2017 InselAir operated the route Curaçao - Sint Maarten with a Fokker 50 turboprop aircraft. This was a consequence of the reorganization and downsizing of the company, during which the Fokker 70 and MD-80 jets were phased out. Consequently, there had not been a jet service between Curaçao and St. Maarten for 15 months. The route was operated only with turboprop aircraft, extending the travel time between the islands to 2.5 hours. During that period, InselAir received numerous requests from the market for reinstatement of a jet service because it shortened the travel time between the islands significantly to only 1.5 hours. Insel Air tried to reinstate a jet service in November 2017 but this was short lived. On June 27, 2018, Insel Air announced the addition of the Embraer E-190 Jet, leased from the Venezuelan airline Conviasa. This would be the first step towards the growth that has been planned for the coming year. It would also be used for the Surinam market and several other destinations which have yet to be announced.

With plans to reinstate most of its flights affected due to the suspension, the airline is still negotiating with the local Department of Civil Aviation regarding the release of at least one of its MD-80s. The aircraft, which was previously registered in Aruba under the Insel Air Aruba brand, was subjected to a C-check before re-entering service at the demand of The Curaçao Civil Aviation Authority. The airline hopes to have the aircraft back in service in August 2017, with a Fokker 70 aircraft to follow, which was also registered under the Insel Air Aruba brand, that has also recently had one of those expensive checks and could, therefore, be available in the short term.

Insel Air Aruba was declared bankrupt on June 7, 2017.

In September 2017, Insel Air began testing one of its MD-83 aircraft that was recently de-registered from Aruba to be able to have the aircraft back into service, being utilized on the Curaçao-Sint Maarten route. Although some issues were still found, work continued on getting the aircraft ready to be put back into service, with plans to re-introduce routes such as Paramaribo, Georgetown and Santo Domingo. On 6 October 2017, it was announced that the Curaçao Civil Aviation Authority (CCAA), had given the green light for the MD-83 to be able to be re-incorporated into schedule once more. On 11 October 2017, it was announced that the MD-83 was officially released for commercial operations after successfully operating a test flight, including inspectors from CCAA and was put into service the next day, operating the Sint Maarten flight, replacing the Fokker 50.

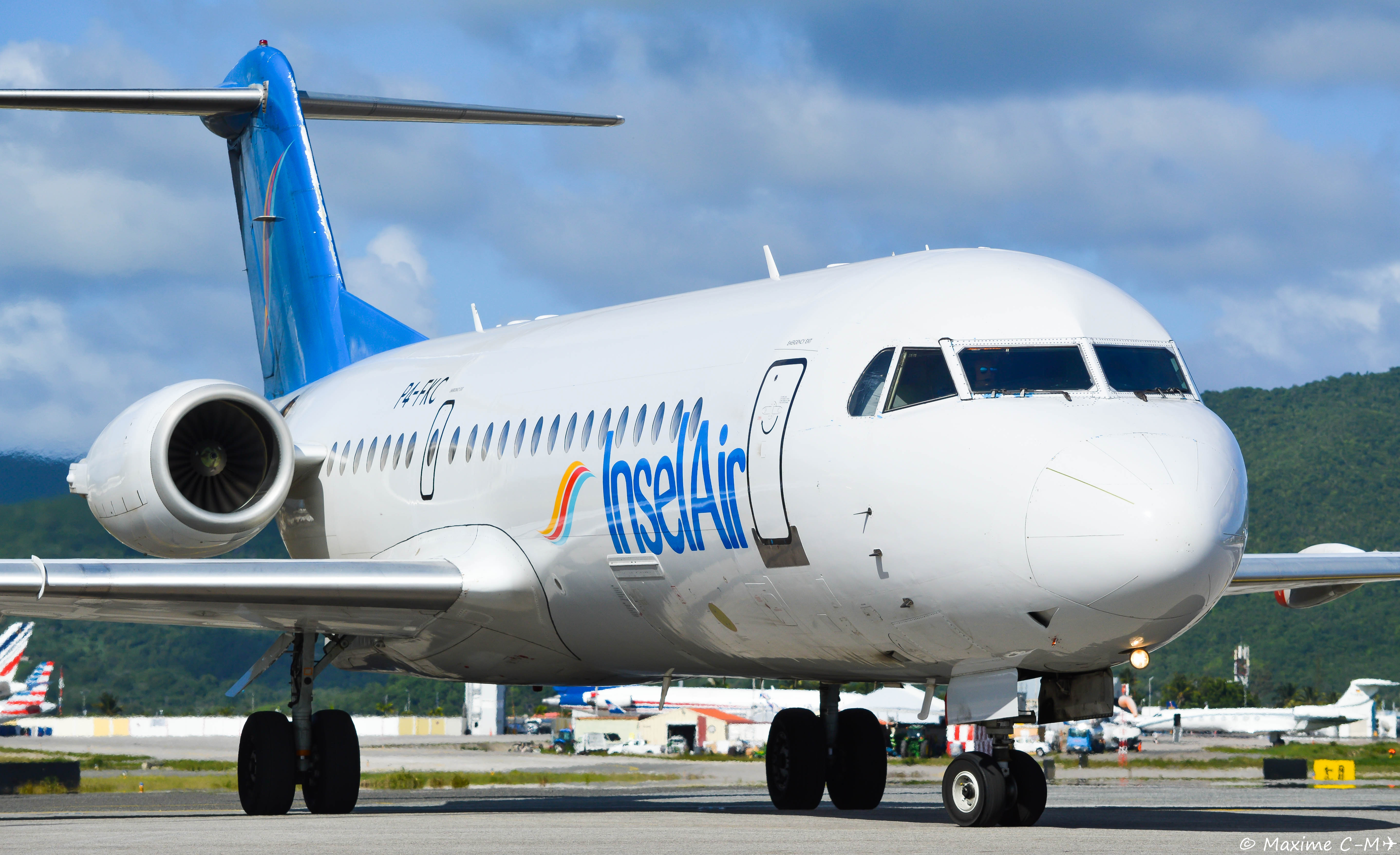
Insel Air Fokker 70 taxiing for departure from Sint Maarten

The airline announced that the following destination to be re-introduced would be the Paramaribo flight, which was one of the airlines' most popular flight after its Aruba, Bonaire and Sint Maarten flight, and would commence in November 2017, after final negotiations have been made to resolve certain things in Surinam and the route was operated by the MD-83. In January 2018 it was decided to end the MD-80 operations as it became financially too much for the airline. This meant that the sole aircraft type Insel Air uses is the Fokker 50.

On February 16, 2018, The Dutch aviation company KLM stopped the cooperation with the local airline InselAir. As a result, travelers flying from the Netherlands to the ABC islands or Sint Maarten could not travel on the same ticket with InselAir for the time being. They had to buy a separate ticket for their subsequent journey and at the airport in question first pick up their luggage and check in again. KLM gave 'the poor operational performance' of InselAir as the reason for the suspension. InselAir's CFO André Delger admitted that the Curaçao airline had experienced a 'difficult week' at the end of January and the beginning of February when both Fokker 50 aircraft were on the ground and flights were delayed or canceled. In March 2018 and June 2018, an Insel Air Fokker 50 had to make an emergency landing due to an engine failure.

On June 14, 2018, Haiti-based Sunrise Airways and Insel Air announced that they would start cooperation on their mutual routes. The cooperation was planned to be implemented in two phases. During the first phase, both airlines sold tickets on each other's flights. The second phase started when the reservation systems of the airlines were merged.

The local airline InselAir could resume its operations to and from Maiquetía, Valencia and Punto Fijo in Venezuela in the short term. On June 18, 2018, it was announced that an agreement was reached between a Curaçao delegation headed by the Minister of Finance, Kenneth Gijsbertha, and the Venezuelan Civil Aviation Authority (INAC). The Minister of Finance traveled to Venezuela with InselAir representatives to hold meetings with Venezuelan aviation authorities that are of the utmost importance for the future and the survival of the airline. According to Gijsbertha, the agreement on resuming flights to Venezuela was 'big news for InselAir', which had not been flying to the neighboring country since March 2017. Venezuela's million debt to InselAir was one of the reasons that the government of Curaçao was forced last year to inject 18 million dollars (33 million guilders) into the airline. And due to this financial issue, the airline was forced to stop flights to various countries including Venezuela. InselAir had been in a financially difficult position since 2016, mainly as a result of too large of a workforce, setting up its own maintenance department that could not support itself, insufficient (financial) management and the need to pre-finance flights to and from Venezuela for too long. At the moment the airline still had a claim of about 67 million dollars on the Venezuelan currency exchange regulator Cencoex.

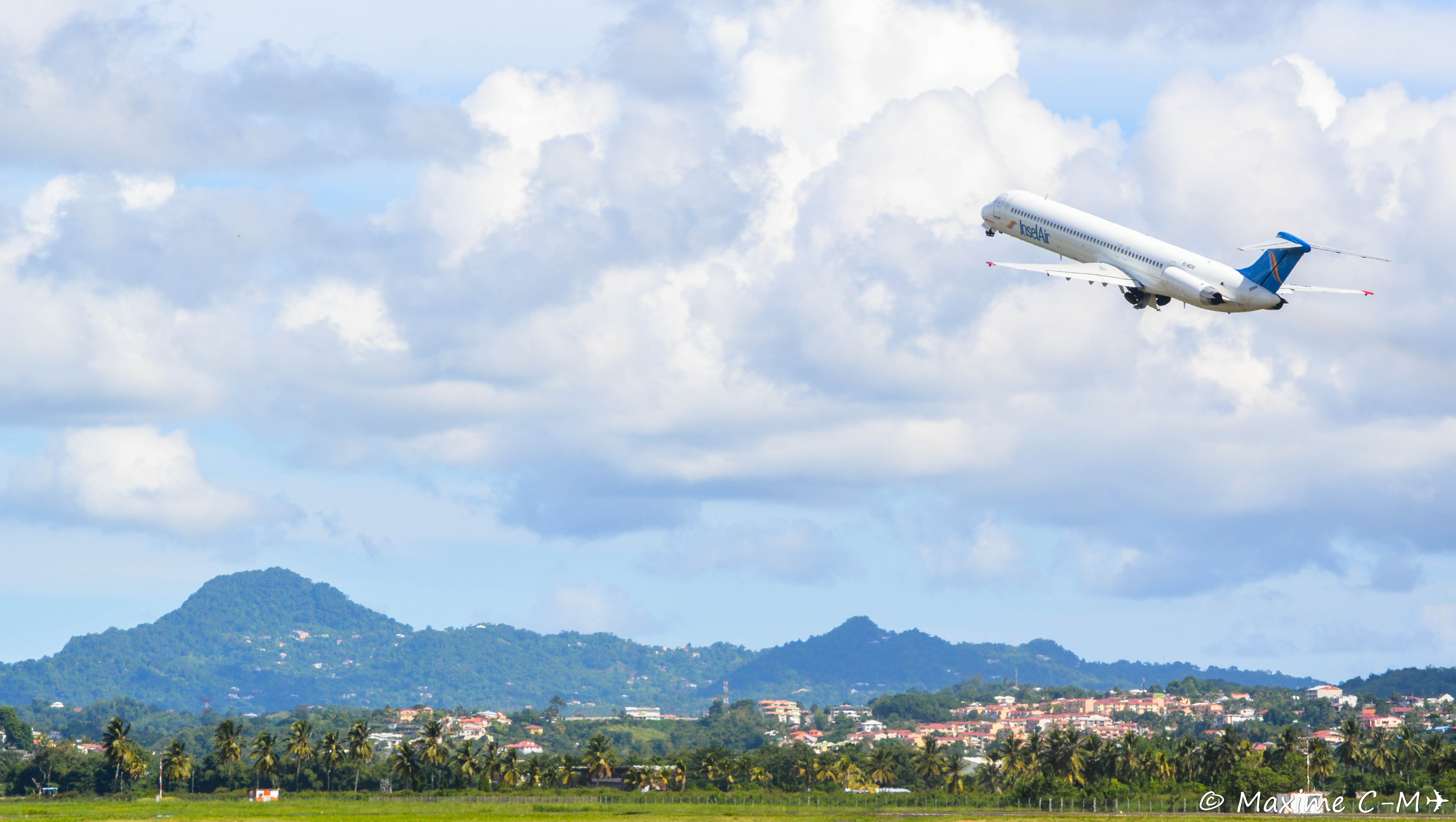
Insel Air McDonnell Douglas departing

In September 2018, it was revealed that discussions were in place between Insel Air and InterCaribbean Airways, based in Turks and Caicos, on the possible takeover and re-organization of Insel Air. Although plans were being worked on, and Insel Air also leased an Embraer 120 from InterCaribbean, the plans did not come to fruition.

Insel Air ceased all operations on 16 February 2019 due to a negative financial outlook.

=== Tidying up the airport ===
In 2019 the removal started of nine out of service aircraft that were stored at the airport since the demise of Insel Air. After the first plane was removed and scrapped, the COVID-19 pandemic halted the clearance. The job was done in 2022 when the last three aircraft were removed.

== Destinations ==
Insel Air operated scheduled flights to 22 destinations across Brazil, the Caribbean, Colombia, the United States and Venezuela from its hubs in Curaçao and Aruba. The airline also operated seasonal flights to additional destinations as well as charter flights on demand. In December 2015 Insel Air started charter flights from Miami to 5 different destinations in Cuba. These destinations included Santiago de Cuba, Camaguey, Havana, Santa Clara and Holguin. Furthermore, Insel Air was planning to introduce Antigua, Barbados and Santiago de Cali (Colombia) to its network, but later failed to fly due to financial restraints.

As of February 2019, Insel Air only operated flights from Curaçao to Aruba, Bonaire and Sint Maarten as part of a restructuring plan after the airline encountered difficulties with its Aruba-based aircraft, which left them with only certain Fokker 50s being able to still operate. Since the passing of Hurricane Irma in September 2017, Sint Maarten has also been discontinued until further notice due to the destruction caused on the island. Sint Maarten service had resumed on October 10, with the opening of the airport on the same day.

City	Country	IATA	ICAO	Airport	Refs/notes
Kralendijk	Caribbean Netherlands	BON	TNCB	Flamingo International Airport	
Oranjestad	Aruba	AUA	TNCA	Queen Beatrix International Airport	
Paramaribo	Suriname	PBM	SMJP	Johan Adolf Pengel International Airport	
Philipsburg	Sint Maarten	SXM	TNCM	Princess Juliana International Airport	
Willemstad	Curaçao	CUR	TNCC	Hato International Airport	Hub

=== Former destinations ===
At its peak, Insel Air and Insel Air Aruba operated a wide range of destinations within the Caribbean, South America and the United States.

City	Country	IATA	ICAO	Airport	INC	NLU	Refs/notes
Barquisimeto	Venezuela	BRM	SVBM	Jacinto Lara International Airport	X	-	
Barranquilla	Colombia	BAQ	SKBQ	Ernesto Cortissoz International Airport	X	-	
Caracas	Venezuela	CCS	SVMI	Simón Bolívar International Airport	X	X	
Charlotte	United States	CLT	KCLT	Charlotte International Airport	X	-	
Georgetown	Guyana	GEO	SYCJ	Cheddi Jagan International Airport	X	X	
Havana	Cuba	HAV	MUHA	José Martí International Airport	X	-	
Holguín	Cuba	HOG	MUHG	Frank País Airport	-	X	Charter
Kingston	Jamaica	KIN	MKJP	Norman Manley International Airport	X	-	
Kralendijk	Caribbean Netherlands	BON	TNCB	Flamingo International Airport	X	-	
La Romana	Dominican Republic	LRM	MDLR	La Romana International Airport	X	-	
Las Piedras	Venezuela	LSP	SVJC	Josefa Camejo International Airport	X	-	
Manaus	Brazil	MAO	SBEG	Eduardo Gomes International Airport	X	X	
Maracaibo	Venezuela	MAR	SVMC	La Chinita International Airport	X	X	
Medellín	Colombia	MDE	SKRG	José María Córdova International Airport	X	X	
Miami	United States	MIA	KMIA	Miami International Airport	X	X	
Oranjestad	Aruba	AUA	TNCA	Queen Beatrix International Airport	X	X	
Paramaribo	Suriname	PBM	SMJP	Johan Adolf Pengel International Airport	X	X	
Philipsburg	Sint Maarten	SXM	TNCM	Princess Juliana International Airport	X	X	
Port-Au-Prince	Haiti	PAP	MTPP	Toussaint Louverture International Airport	X	-	
Port of Spain	Trinidad and Tobago	POS	TPP	Piarco International Airport	X	-	
Puerto Ordaz	Venezuela	PZO	SVPR	Manuel Carlos Piar Guayana Airport	X	-	
Punta Cana	Dominican Republic	PUJ	MDPC	Punta Cana International Airport	X	-	Charter
San Juan	Puerto Rico	SJU	TJSJ	Luis Muñoz Marín International Airport	-	X	
Santiago de Cuba	Cuba	SCU	MUCU	Antonio Maceo Airport	-	X	Charter
Santo Domingo	Dominican Republic	SDQ	MDSD	Las Américas International Airport	X	X	
Valencia	Venezuela	VLN	SVVA	Arturo Michelena International Airport	X	X	
Willemstad	Curaçao	CUR	TNCC	Hato International Airport	X	X	Hub

=== Codeshare/interline agreements ===
Insel Air had not established itself with any airline alliance, but had interline agreements with the following airlines during its years of operations:

- Avianca
- Caribbean Airlines
- LIAT
- Seaborne Airlines
- Sunrise Airways
- Surinam Airways
- Winair

Insel Air also had a codeshare agreement with KLM, but the agreement was terminated in 2018, after Insel Air began suffering poor on-time performance which resulted from lack of aircraft to operate their scheduled flights.

== Fleet ==
=== Fleet at time of dissolution ===
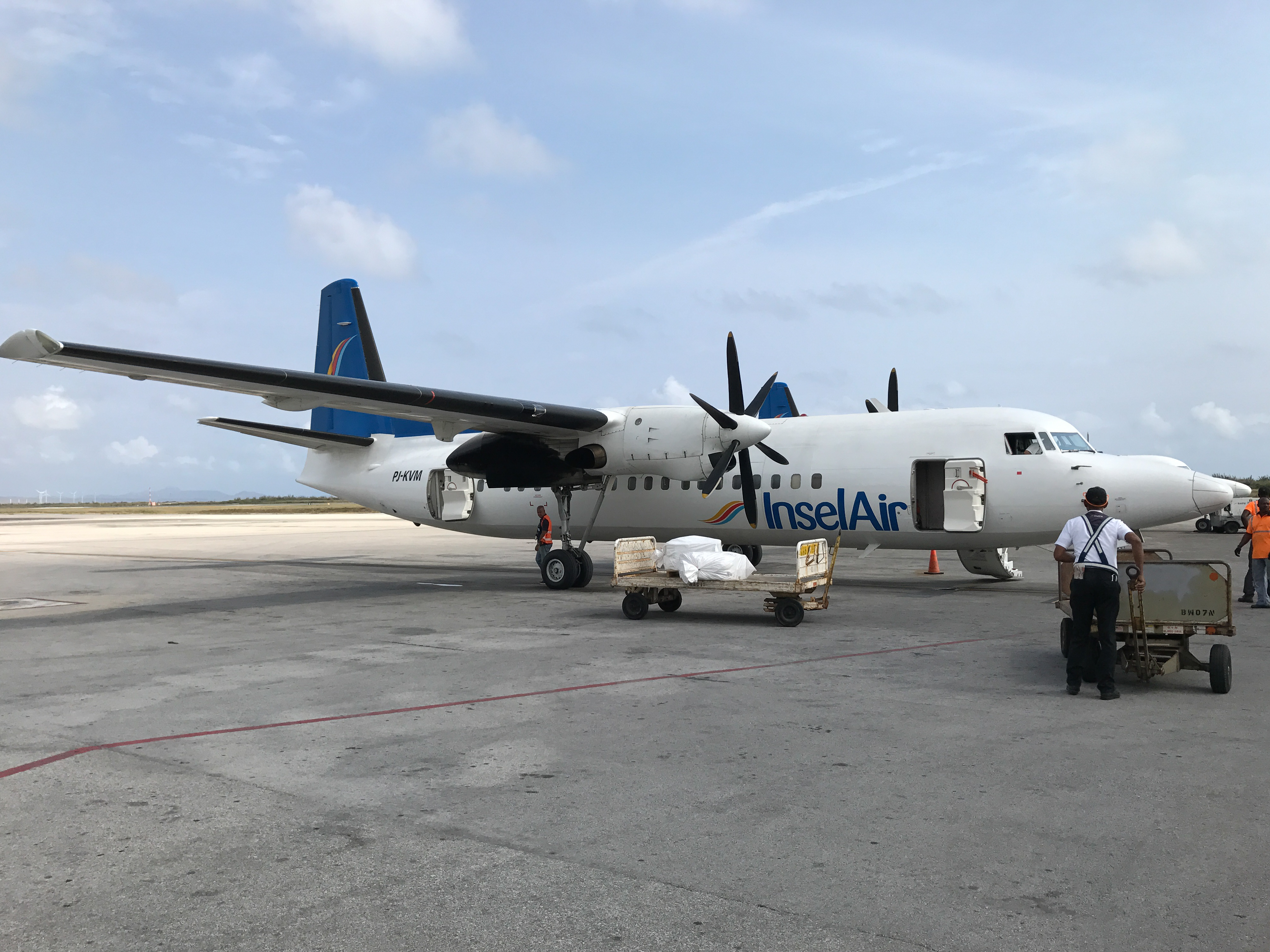
Insel Air Fokker 50

At the time of Insel Air's end, its fleet consisted of the following aircraft:

Insel Air fleet
Aircraft	In service	Orders	Passengers			Notes
Aircraft	In service	Orders	Y+	Y	Total	Notes
Fokker 50	3	—	8	42	50	2 stored
Total	3	—				

=== Previously operated ===
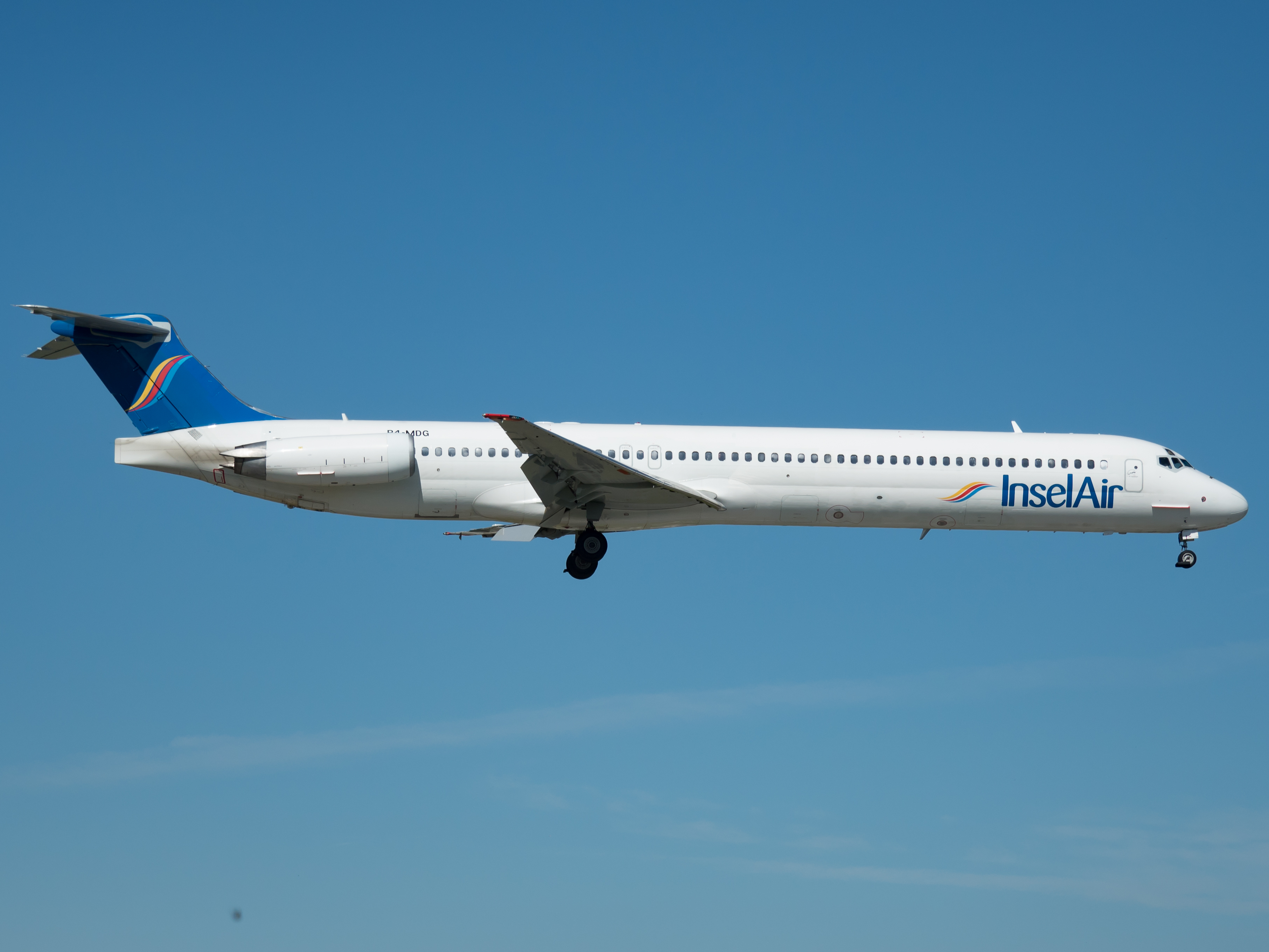
Former Insel Air McDonnell Douglas MD-83

Over the years, Insel Air and Insel Air Aruba operated the following types, not including leased aircraft:

Insel Air fleet
Aircraft	In service		Notes
Aircraft	7I	8I	Notes
Embraer 110-P1 Bandeirante	3	—	
Fokker 50	4	—	
Fokker 70	—	4	
McDonnell Douglas MD-82	2	2	
McDonnell Douglas MD-83	3	2	
Total	12	8	

Insel Air also leased numerous aircraft from other airlines both during and at the end of their operations. Here is a list of aircraft types and their operators:

- Boeing 737-300 leased from Swift Air
- Boeing 737-400 leased from Swift Air
- Bombardier Dash 8-300 leased from Voyageur Airways
- Embraer 120 leased from InterCaribbean Airways
- Embraer 190 leased from Conviasa
- Fokker 70 leased from Fly All Ways
- McDonnell Douglas MD80 leased from World Atlantic Airlines

=== Livery ===
The initial livery which was introduced on the Embraer 110s and the first five McDonnell Douglas MD80s, was a simplified livery of a white fuselage with the Insel Air logo near the front and a blue tail with a yellow curved line and two white stars representing the Curaçao flag. The MD80s received a modified logo and a lighter blue color on the tail while the Embraers (with the exception of the first delivered aircraft) remained unchanged.

The McDonnell Douglas MD80s later received a new livery when the acquisition for the Fokker 50s were finalised and when Insel Air Aruba was established. The livery, which was introduced on the airline's sixth MD80, consisted of the same simplified white fuselage with the new updated Insel Air logo and three (yellow, red and blue) wave-like curves near the front and with an even lighter blue tail, but three (yellow, red and blue) wave-like curves replaced the yellow curved line and two white stars on the tail. This livery has also been applied to the rest of the MD80 fleet as well as the Fokker 70s that were delivered in 2014.

One MD82, which is operated by Insel Air Aruba, featured a similar livery, but the official Aruba logo is located near the front while the Insel Air logo is closer to the center emergency exit doors and bears an Aruban registration. The MD83's operated by Insel Air Aruba still wears the standard livery but with an Aruban registration.

The first three Fokker 50s had somewhat of a similar to the Insel Air Aruba MD82. The aircraft wore an enlarged version of the official Aruba logo in the front of the aircraft with a light blue and light green stripe running across the fuselage to the back. The aircraft also has the same light blue tail resembling the MD80s but includes the Insel Air logo with the three (yellow, red and blue) wave-like curves. The forward part of the tail includes an even lighter shade of blue blending into white. All six Fokkers still wear Curaçao registrations. Later on, most of the Fokker 50s were repainted and updated with the standard livery consisting of the white fuselage featuring the Insel Air logo and the blue tail containing the three colored waves.

Before being retired, the first Embraer operated by Insel Air received a new livery resembling that of the MD80s. The aircraft was named Elis Juliana, after a popular author and poet from Curaçao.

=== Logo ===
During the airline's operations, its logo has gone through changes in font style, somewhat representing the evolution of its growth.

2006–2009

2009–2012

2012–2019

== Services ==
=== Onboard ===
Insel Air offered inflight service on flights longer than 45 minutes. Customers seated in Comfort class were offered alcoholic beverages, premium food, local newspapers and a Comfort Class travel kit. For Economy class, customers were offered free food and beverages, local newspapers and raffle for a chance to win back one's ticket. Insel Air's inflight magazine, INsights, was available on all aircraft and available for personal possession.

=== Loyalty programme ===
Insel Air's frequent flyer/loyalty programme was called "Insel Star Miles" in which members earn points for miles flown, with benefits such as priority check-in and free baggage allowances. Membership levels included Basic, Silver, Gold and Diamond.

== Accidents and incidents ==
Safety concerns have been raised about Insel Air. The United States, United Kingdom and the Netherlands authorities have prohibited their staff from using the airline while safety checks are being carried out.

- On August 29, 2015, Insel Air International, flight 7I533 operated by a McDonnell Douglas MD-82, was en route from Princess Juliana International Airport in Sint Maarten to Toussaint Louverture International Airport in Haiti when the crew received a fire indication for the left engine east of Santo Domingo prompting the crew to shut down the engine. The aircraft diverted safely to Las Americas International Airport. Emergency services did not detect any evidence of an engine fire.
- On September 2, 2015, Insel Air International, flight 7I901 operated by a McDonnell Douglas MD-82, was en route from Curaçao's Hato International Airport to Miami International Airport when the crew received an engine indication en route near Santo Domingo prompting the crew to shut down the engine, causing the flight to divert. The aircraft landed safely at Las Americas International Airport.
- On November 18, 2015, Insel Air International, flight 7I534 operated by a McDonnell Douglas MD-82, encountered problems while climbing out of the Princess Juliana International Airport of Sint Maarten and had to shut down an engine due to loss of oil pressure. The aircraft returned to Sint Maarten and landed safely, 20 minutes after departure.
- On January 13, 2017, Insel Air International flight 7I901 operated by a McDonnell Douglas MD-82, was en route from Curaçao's Hato International Airport to Miami International Airport, when the aircraft encountered pressurization problems and had to return to Curaçao. Following procedures, the pilots descended the plane to 25,000 ft and during the descent, the aircraft lost its cabin pressure and the pilots had to make an emergency drop to 10,000 ft. The pilots then instructed the crew members and passengers to use the oxygen masks. According to Insel Air, the oxygen mask compartments were opened by the pilots themselves. The plane then landed safely back in Curaçao. None of the passengers on board were injured, except for four passengers that were treated for ear and nasal symptoms by the doctor present at the airport. This would be one of several incidents in the January 2017 followed by a similar incident involving Insel Air International, flight 7I521 operated by a McDonnell Douglas MD-83 on January 24, 2017, which was en route from Curaçao's Hato International Airport to Princess Juliana International Airport in Sint Maarten when it also encountered pressurization problems and had to turn back to Curaçao. These incidents would lead to the grounding of the entire MD-80 fleet for inspection in regards to the airline's safety performance in the same month.
- On March 19, 2018, Insel Air International flight number 7I512 had to return to St. Maarten about an hour after the aircraft took off from the Princess Juliana International Airport. The aircraft had to return to the St Maarten airport after developing an airborne engine shutdown. The aircraft safely returned to the airport.
- On June 13, 2018, an Insel Air International flight from St-Maarten to Curaçao returned to Juliana airport after the pilots saw an indication that the engine was running hot. They followed the procedure that is prescribed by the manufacturer and shut down the engine as a precaution and landed the aircraft safely. All passengers on board were provided with a hotel, transportation and meals and will transported back to Curaçao on other flights as soon as possible.
