= List of airline holding companies =

This is a list of airline holding companies, that either own more than one airline or are the parent company of a single airline.

A company or firm in which the holding company owns a significant portion of voting shares, usually 20–50% or a "minority of share ownership", is known as an associate company. A company in which the holding company owns more than 50% voting shares or a "majority of share ownership" is known as a subsidiary. The holding company thus can also be referred to as the parent company at that stage.

== Africa ==
EgyptAir Holding Company
• EgyptAir • EgyptAir Cargo • EgyptAir Express

Ethiopian Airlines Group
• Ethiopian Airlines • Malawi Airlines (49%) • ASKY (40%) • Air Congo (49%) • Zambia Airways (45%)
Kenya Airways Holding Company
Majority holdings:
• Kenya Airways • Jambojet • Kenya Airways Cargo • Kencargo Airlines International
Minority holdings:
• Precision Air - 41.23% shareholding

Libyan African Aviation Holding Company

• Libyan Airlines • Afriqiyah Airways • United Aviation

South African Airline Holdings Limited
• South African Airways • South African Express • Mango

== Asia; Central, Far East, South, and Southwest ==
Air China Group
Majority holdings:
• Air China • Air China Cargo • Air Macau • AMECO • Tibet Airlines • Dalian Airlines • Shandong Airlines • Shenzhen Airlines
Minority holdings (by Air China):
• Cathay Pacific (30%) • Sichuan Airlines (10%)
ANA Holdings
Majority holdings:
• Air Japan
• Air Nippon
• All Nippon Airways
• Peach
• Nippon Cargo Airlines
Minority holdings:
• Philippine Airlines (9.5%)
China Airlines Group
• China Airlines • Mandarin Airlines • Tigerair Taiwan
China Eastern Air Holding Company
Major holdings:
• China Cargo Airlines • China Eastern Airlines • China Eastern Yunnan Airlines • China United Airlines • Shanghai Airlines • OTT Airlines
Minor holdings:
• Air France–KLM • Sichuan Airlines (10%)
China Southern Air Holding
Major holdings:
• China Southern Airlines • Chongqing Airlines (60%) • GAMECO • XiamenAir (55%)
Minority holdings:
• Sichuan Airlines (39%)
Sichuan Airlines Group
• Sichuan Airlines (40%) • Chengdu Airlines (40%)
Decor Aviation
• Air Pegasus
The Emirates Group
• Emirates • Emirates SkyCargo • Emirates Executive• FlyDubai
Etihad Airways
Majority holdings:
• Etihad Airways (100%)
Minority former holdings:
• Air Serbia (49%) • Air Seychelles (40%) • Virgin Australia (24%)
Evergreen Group
• Eva Air • Uni Air
Hanjin
• Asiana Airlines (63.9%) • Korean Air • Jin Air
HNA Aviation
• Air Chang'an • China Xinhua Airlines • Hainan Airlines • Shanxi Airlines • Beijing Capital Airlines • Fuzhou Airlines • Grand China Air • GX Airlines • Hong Kong Airlines • Lucky Air • Tianjin Airlines • Urumqi Air • West Air • Suparna Airlines • Africa World Airlines • Azul Brazilian Airlines • MyCargo Airlines • Virgin Australia
InterGlobe Enterprises
• IndiGo
Jagson Group
• Jagson Airlines
Japan Airlines

- J-Air
- Japan Air Commuter
- Japan Transocean Air
  - Ryukyu Air Commuter
- Jetstar Japan
- Hokkaido Air System
- Spring Japan
- Zipair Tokyo

Kumho Asiana Group
• Asiana Airlines (36.1%) • Air Busan (49%) • Air Seoul
LEPL Group
• Air Costa
NANSHAN Group
• Qingdao Airlines • Virgin Australia
Qatar Airways Group
Majority holdings:
• Qatar Airways • Qatar Airways Cargo
Minority holdings:
• IAG (Aer Lingus• British Airways • Iberia Airlines) (21%) • Cathay Pacific (10%) • LATAM (10%) • China Southern Airlines (5%)
Swire

- Cathay Pacific (45%)
  - Air Hong Kong (100%)
  - HK Express (100%)
  - Air China (18% cross-ownership)
  - Air China Cargo (49%)

Tata Sons

- Air India (74.9%)
  - Air India Express

Temasek Holdings
- Singapore Airlines (100%)
• Scoot • Air India (25.1%)
Wadia Group
• GoAir (defunct)

== Australasia, and Southeast Asia ==
AirAsia Group
AirAsia Cambodia • AirAsia • AirAsia X • Philippines AirAsia
Minority holdings: Indonesia AirAsia (49.25%) • Thai AirAsia (45%) • Thai AirAsia X (50%)

Garuda Indonesia Group
Citilink • Garuda Indonesia

Lion Air Group
Batik Air • Batik Air Malaysia • Lion Air • Super Air Jet • Thai Lion Air • Wings Air

Sriwijaya Air Group
NAM Air • Sriwijaya Air

PAL Holdings

- Philippine Airlines
- PAL Express

Malaysia Aviation Group

- Malaysia Airlines
- Firefly
- MASkargo

Qantas Group

- Qantas
- QantasLink
- Jetstar
- Jetconnect
- Network Aviation
- Fiji Airways (46%)
- Jetstar Japan (33%)
- Alliance Airlines (20%)

Singapore Airlines

- Singapore Airlines
- Singapore Airlines Cargo
- Tiger Airways Holdings
  - Scoot
- Virgin Australia Holdings (20%)

VietJet Air

- VietJet Air
- Thai Vietjet Air

Thai Airways International Public Company Ltd.

- Thai
  - Nok Air
  - Thai Smile

Vietnam Airlines

- Vietnam Airlines
  - Pacific Airlines (98%)
  - Vietnam Air Services Company

Virgin Australia Holdings

- Virgin Australia
- Virgin Australia Regional Airlines

CPAir Holdings

- Cebu Pacific (66.15%)
  - Cebgo

== Europe ==
Air France–KLM
Air France (Air France Cargo • Air France Hop • Transavia France) • KLM (KLM Cargo • KLM Cityhopper • Martinair • Transavia)
Minority holdings: Air Calédonie (2%) • Air Côte d'Ivoire (20%) • Air Mauritius (5%) • Air Tahiti (7%) • Air Corsica (12%) • Kenya Airways (7.8%) • Royal Air Maroc (3%) • Scandinavian Airlines (20%) • WestJet (2.3%)

Air Greenland A/S
Air Greenland
Minority holdings: Norlandair (25%)

Avia Solutions Group
Avion Express • Bluebird Nordic • KlasJet • SmartLynx Airlines (SmartLynx Airlines Estonia)

DHL Aviation
Blue Dart Aviation • DHL Aero Expreso • DHL Air Austria • DHL Air UK • DHL Aviation South Africa • DHL de Guatemala • DHL Ecuador • DHL International Aviation ME
Joint ventures: AeroLogic (50% with Lufthansa)
Minority holdings: Polar Air Cargo (49% with Atlas Air) • Tasman Cargo Airlines (49%) • Vensecar Internacional (49%)

Icelandair Group
Icelandair • Icelandair Cargo

International Airlines Group
Aer Lingus • British Airways (BA CityFlyer) • Iberia (Iberia Express) • IAG Cargo • Vueling Airlines
Minority holdings: Air Europa (20%)

Lufthansa Group
Air Dolomiti • Austrian Airlines • Brussels Airlines • Eurowings • Lufthansa Airlines, Lufthansa Cargo, Lufthansa CityLine • Swiss International Air Lines • Edelweiss Air
Joint ventures: AeroLogic (50% with DHL) • SunExpress (50% with Turkish Airlines)

Ryanair Holdings
Buzz • Malta Air • Lauda Europe • Ryanair • Ryanair UK

SAS Group
Scandinavian Airlines
Minority holdings: Air Greenland (37.5%)

Smartwings Group
Smartwings • Smartwings Hungary • Smartwings Poland • Smartwings Slovakia
Minority holdings: Czech Airlines (30%)

TAP Group
Portugália • PGA Express • TAP Portugal

TUI Group
TUI Airways • TUI fly Belgium • TUI fly Deutschland • TUI fly Netherlands • TUIfly Nordic
Minority holdings: Corsair International (27%)

Türk Hava Yolları Anonim Ortaklığı (English: Turkish Airlines Joint Stock Partnership)
AJet • Turkish Airlines
Joint venture: SunExpress (50% with Lufthansa)
Minority holdings: Air Albania (49.1%)

Virgin Group
Majority holdings: Virgin Atlantic (51%)
Minority holdings: AirAsia X (20%) • Virgin Australia Holdings (8%)

== North America ==
Air Transport Services Group
ABX Air • Air Transport International • Omni Air International

Alaska Air Group
Alaska Airlines • Horizon Air • Hawaiian Airlines

American Airlines Group
American Airlines • Envoy Air • Piedmont Airlines • PSA Airlines
Minority holdings: JetSmart (34%) China Southern Airlines (3%)

Atlas Air Worldwide Holdings
Atlas Air
Majority holdings: Polar Air Cargo (51% with DHL)

Delta Air Lines, Inc.
Delta Air Lines • Endeavor Air
Minority holdings: Aeromexico (20%) • Air France-KLM (3%) • China Eastern Airlines (3%) • Korean Air (15%, via Hanjin ownership) • LATAM Airlines (10%) • Virgin Atlantic (49%) • WestJet (12.7%)

FLOAT Alaska
FLOAT Shuttle • New Pacific Airlines • Ravn Alaska • Ravn Connect

Grupo Aeromexico
Aeroméxico • Aeroméxico Connect

Republic Airways Holdings
Republic Airlines

Saltchuk
Aloha Air Cargo • Northern Air Cargo • Ryan Air

SkyWest, Inc.
SkyWest Airlines
Minority holdings: Contour Airlines (25%)

Trans States Holdings
GoJet Airlines

United Airlines Holdings
United Airlines
Minority holdings: Mesa Air Group (10%)

== South and Central America ==
Aerolíneas Argentinas S.A.
Minority holdings:
• Aerohandling • Aerolíneas Argentinas Cargo • Aerolíneas Argentinas • JetPaq S.A. • Optar S.A. • AUSTRAL

Avior Airlines Group
Minority holdings:
• Avior Airlines • Avior Airlines Perú • Avior Regional • Gran Colombia de Aviación • Tiara Air

Copa Holdings
AeroRepública (Copa Airlines Colombia • Wingo) • Copa Airlines

Kingsland Holding
Minority holdings:
• (34%) AviancaTaca Holding S.A. - Avianca S.A. • TACA International Airlines S.A. • Volaris (25%)
• (100%) TACA International Airlines S.A. - TACA Regional • LACSA • Aeroman • TACA Panamá

LATAM Airlines Group
Majority holdings:
• LAN Argentina • LAN Cargo • LAN Chile • LAN Ecuador • LAN Express • LAN Perú • LAN Colombia •
• ABSA Cargo Airline •LANCO • MasAir • TAM Linhas Aéreas S.A • TAM Airlines • TAM Paraguay

Synergy Aerospace Corp.
Majority holdings:
• (66%) AviancaTaca Holding S.A. - Avianca S.A. • TACA International Airlines S.A.
• (100%) Avianca S.A. - SAM S.A. • Tampa Cargo • VarigLog • OceanAir • Macair Jet • VIP S.A. • AeroGal • Capital Airlines • Helicol S.A. • TurbServ
