= Frontier Alaska =

Frontier Alaska was the name under which HoTH, Inc., marketed the services of its multiple airline holdings: Frontier Flying Service, Hageland Aviation Services, and Era Aviation. It is now part of the Ravn group of companies of Ravn Alaska / Ravn Connect / Ravn Connect - Charters. These HoTH airlines group of companies are featured in the television show Flying Wild Alaska.

== History ==
The name Frontier Alaska began to be used following the June 2008 merger of Frontier Flying Service with Hageland Aviation Services, with the name applied to the operations of both airlines.

On July 8, 2008, Seattle based Alaska Airlines announced Frontier Alaska as a new code share partner beginning in the fall of 2008.

On February 27, 2009, Frontier Alaska, acquired rival Era Aviation of Anchorage, Alaska.

Era Aviation will be d/b/a ERA Alaska once it operations are rationalized into the Frontier Alaska / Era Alaska fleets and their representative FAA and DOT operating certificates.

In 2014 with the merger, integration, and asset rationalization mostly complete, Frontier Alaska was rebranded as Ravn Alaska and Ravn Connect. Ravn Alaska the FAA part 121 operations of the Ravn business, predominantly utilizes the former assets of Era Aviation; while Ravn Connect, the FAA Part 135 of the Ravn business, predominately utilizes the assets of the former Hageland Aviation. Frontier Flying Services and Arctic Circle Air assets have thus been overtaken by these two regulatory mandated business sectors

HoTH Inc. remains the parent holding company of all assets of the business to this day.

== HoTH Inc. Fleet ==
At present the Frontier Alaska fleet includes the following aircraft at the various pre-merger airlines.

=== Era Aviation ===
- 7 Bombardier Dash 8 Q106
- 3 Beechcraft 1900D
- 3 Beechcraft 1900C

=== Frontier Flying Service ===
- 0 Raytheon Beech BE-1900-C
- 2 Piper PA-31-350
- 2 Shorts SD-330 Sherpa

=== Hageland Aviation Services ===
- 21 Cessna Caravan 208B
- 6 Raytheon Beech 1900C Airliner
- 17 Cessna 207
- 4 Reims-Cessna F406 Caravan II
- 6 Piper PA-31 Chieftain

=== Arctic Circle Air ===
- 2 Shorts 330-200s
- 3 Shorts Skyvans

Arctic Circle Air bought by Frontier Alaska and to be operated under Era Aviations certificate.

== See also ==
- List of defunct airlines of the United States
