= Dr. Antonio Nicolás Briceño Airport =

Colonel Antonio Nicolás Briceño Airport Dr. Antonio Nicolás Briceño Airport
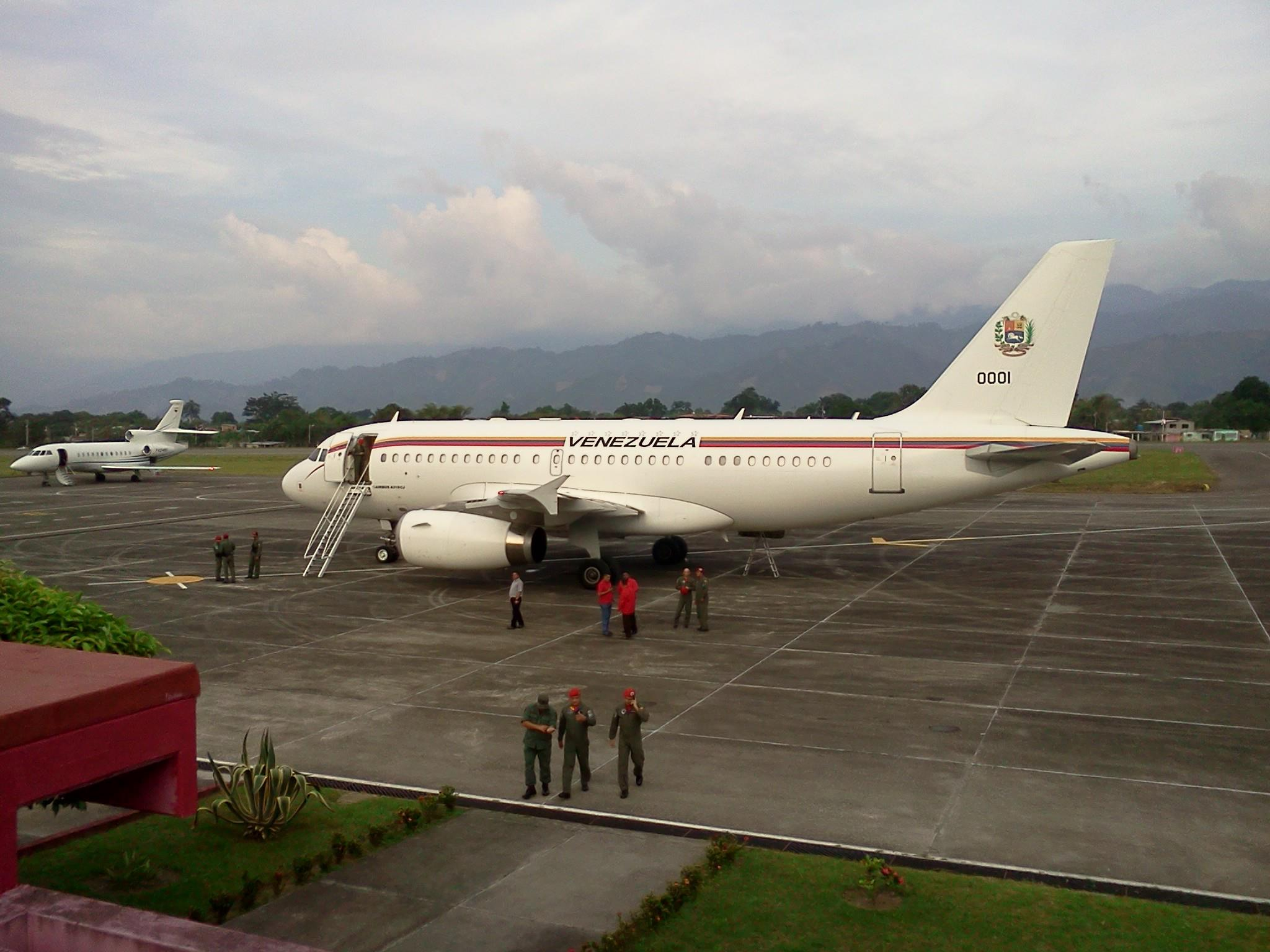
- IATA: VLV; ICAO: SVVL

Summary
- Airport type: Public
- Location: Valera, Venezuela
- Elevation AMSL: 1,893 ft / 577 m
- Coordinates: 9°20′27″N 70°35′03″W

Map
- Location of airport in Venezuela

Runways
Direction	Length		Surface
Direction	m	ft	Surface
03/21	2,060	6,759	Asphalt
- Sources: GCM

Colonel Antonio Nicolás Briceño Airport (IATA: VLV, ICAO: SVVL), formerly known as Antonio Nicolas Briceno National Airport, is the main Trujillo state airport in the Venezuelan Andes, located on Avenida Principal La Hoyada in the municipality of Carvajal, just outside Valera. The airport is named after Antonio Nicolás Briceño, a lawyer and officer during the Venezuelan War of Independence. The runway sits on a broad ridge 65 metres (213 ft) above the city of Valera.

== Airlines and destinations ==
Airlines	Destinations
Conviasa	Caracas, Porlamar

On December 29, 2012, during a press conference, executives of Avior Airlines, announced it would reopen flights to this destination, being operated by the subsidiary Avior Regional with two daily flights from Caracas from 1 April 2013. Then on April 7, again during a press conference at the VIP Lounge, Avior Airlines managers announced postponement of the opening date to Monday, June 15 of the same year.

== Incidents ==
- Flight 2197: On August 13, 2012 an ATR 72-212, belonging to Conviasa, with 70 people on board (67 passengers and 3 crew), made a high-speed aborted takeoff, resulting in a runway excursion ending very close to a ravine. The passengers walked off the plane on their own and made their way back to the airport. There was strong fuel odor. This incident resulted in one unharmed person and 69 others that sustained minor injuries. The aircraft suffered damage on its fuselage.

== See also ==
- Transport in Venezuela
- List of airports in Venezuela
