= Era Aviation =

Regional airline in Alaska, 1948–2009

IATA	ICAO	Call sign
7H	ERH	ERAH
- Founded: 1948; 78 years ago (as Economy Helicopters)
- Commenced operations: 1948; 78 years ago
- Ceased operations: February 27, 2009; 17 years ago (bought by Frontier Alaska Group, name change to Era Alaska and then Ravn Alaska). After the original operational group, Era Helicopters, now part of Bristow Group, having left common ownership on July 1st, 2004.
- Hubs: Ted Stevens Anchorage International Airport
- Frequent-flyer program: Alaska Airlines Mileage Plan – Era Aviation FlyAway Rewards
- Fleet size: 12
- Destinations: up to 32
- Parent company: Era Aviation, Inc
- Headquarters: Anchorage, Alaska, U.S.

Era Aviation was a fixed wing airline as well as a commercial helicopter operation based in Anchorage, Alaska, United States. It operated a network of scheduled fixed wing passenger services from Anchorage as well as from Bethel, AK on behalf of Alaska Airlines via a code sharing agreement. Its main base was located at the Ted Stevens Anchorage International Airport (ANC). Era Aviation was later renamed Corvus Airlines and subsequently did business as Ravn Alaska before ultimately ending service in August, 2025. The company slogan was FlySmart. FlyEra.

== History ==
Era Aviation was established and initiated operations in 1948 when Carl Brady flew the first commercial helicopter to Alaska for contract work supporting a mapping project for the U.S. government. Fixed wing aircraft were then acquired by the company in addition to helicopters with rotorcraft being operated in Alaska, California and Louisiana by the Era Helicopters division. In 1967, Houston-based Rowan Companies, purchased the company from founder Carl Brady. Scheduled fixed wing passenger services began in May 1983. During the summer of 1984, Era was operating scheduled services between Anchorage and Bethel, Kenai and Valdez. The airline formerly operated Convair 580 turboprops as well as de Havilland Canada DHC-6 Twin Otter and DHC-7 Dash 7 aircraft and then added DHC-8 Dash 8 turboprops. Most of the airline's scheduled passenger flights were code share feeder services for Alaska Airlines. Era used the two-letter "AS" airline code for its flight numbers on these services for Alaska Airlines. Beechcraft 1900C and Beechcraft 1900D turboprops were subsequently added to the fleet.

In late 2004, Rowan Companies sold Era Aviation (including the Era Helicopters division which subsequently merged with the Bristow Group, a large, U.S.-based international and domestic commercial helicopter operator, in 2020) to SEACOR Marine (now SEACOR Holdings). Rowan had owned Era Aviation including the Era Helicopters division since 1967 before selling Era to SEACOR. SEACOR in turn had acquired Houston-based Tex-Air Helicopters in 2002 and then merged Tex-Air into Era Helicopters in 2004. SEACOR subsequently sold the Era Aviation fixed wing operation, but retained Era Helicopters. The new owners of the Era Aviation fixed wing operation then filed for Chapter 11 bankruptcy.

Effective February 27, 2009, Era Aviation, Inc. was bought out and became a subsidiary of The Frontier Alaska Group along with Frontier Flying Service and Hageland Aviation. The combination of the three air carriers resulted in the largest Alaska-based airline in terms of serving more destinations and passengers operated with the largest airplane fleet in the state. The three airlines then operated under the marketing name of Era Alaska/Frontier Alaska (Hagland Aviation and Frontier Flying Services) which has since changed the marketing name of all the airlines to Ravn Alaska/Ravn Connect brands.

== Destinations ==
Era Aviation operated scheduled passenger services to the following destinations in Alaska and Canada at various times over the years prior to the merger which created Era Alaska.

Most flights were operated from its hub located at the Ted Stevens International Airport (ANC) in Anchorage:

- Aniak, Alaska
- Barrow, Alaska (via an intermediate stop in Fairbanks)
- Bethel, Alaska (hub for village service flights)
- Cordova, Alaska
- Deadhorse, Alaska (Prudhoe Bay, Alaska)
- Fairbanks, Alaska
- Galena, Alaska
- Homer, Alaska
- Iliamna, Alaska
- Kenai, Alaska
- Kodiak, Alaska
- St. Mary's, Alaska
- Unalakleet, Alaska
- Valdez, Alaska
- Whitehorse, Yukon, Canada - only international route flown by Era

In addition, Ravn Alaska offers scheduled service to more than 100 communities statewide.

== Fleet ==
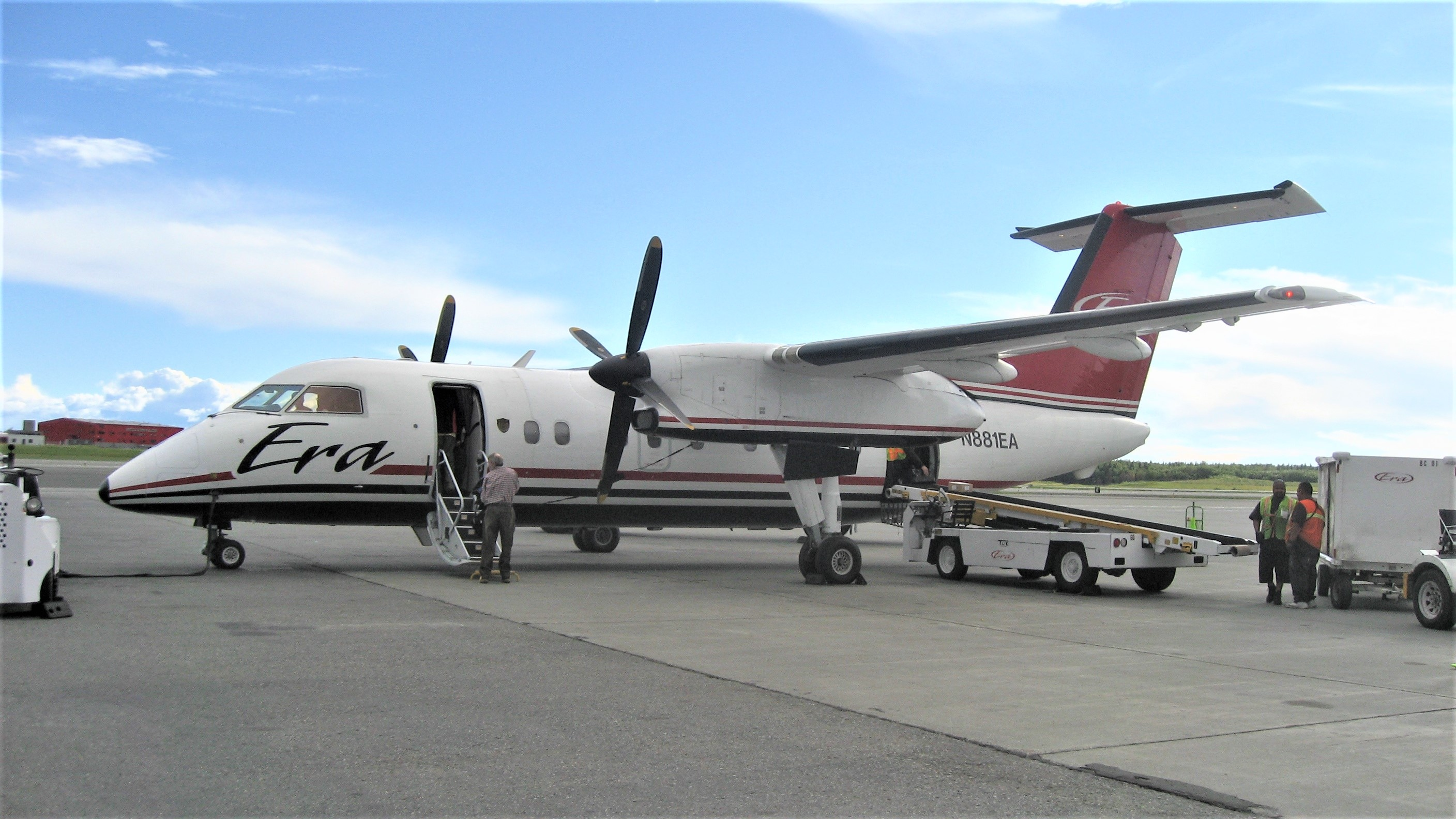
Era Aviation De Havilland Canada DHC-8-103

The Corvus fleet included the following aircraft (upon merger):

- 3 Beechcraft 1900D
- 10 Bombardier Dash 8 Q100

Era Aviation previously operated Convair 580 turboprop aircraft as well as de Havilland Canada DHC-6 Twin Otter and DHC-7 Dash 7 turboprop aircraft. The Twin Otter and Dash 7 are short takeoff and landing (STOL) aircraft. The company also operated a Lear 35 business jet; however, this aircraft was not used in scheduled passenger airline operations but instead for aeromedical air ambulance services. A flight seeing air tour service with Douglas DC-3 aircraft was also operated from Anchorage as Era Classic Airlines.

== Buyout, divestiture and bankruptcy ==
Era Aviation was owned by Rowan Companies from 1967 until late 2004. On Jan. 4, 2005, Rowan announced the sale of Era to SEACOR Marine (now SEACOR Holdings) effective on Dec. 30, 2004 for $118.1 million in cash. Six months later, ownership of Era Aviation changed hands again with SEACOR retaining ownership of Era Helicopters, formerly a division of Era Aviation. Era Helicopters then merged with the Bristow Group, a large commercial helicopter operator, in 2020. Approximately six months later, the new ownership of Era Aviation filed for Chapter 11 bankruptcy in late 2005. In 2009 the company was acquired by rival Frontier Alaska Group with the Frontier Flying Service Part 121 mainline operation being engaged in the process of being merged into Era Aviation's operating certificate. In 2010, Era Alaska was formed using the assets of Frontier Alaska Group, Frontier Flying Service, Era Aviation, and Hageland Aviation. In 2014, Era's parent company changed its name to Corvus Airlines d/b/a Ravn Alaska.

== See also ==
- List of defunct airlines of the United States
