= Malaysia Aviation Group =

Aviation company in Malaysia

Malaysia Aviation Group Berhad
- Type: Public limited company
- Industry: Aviation; Hospitality
- Founded: May 19, 2016; 10 years ago
- Headquarters: Malaysia Airlines Berhad Administration Building, South Support Zone, Kuala Lumpur International Airport (KLIA), 64000 Sepang, Selangor, Malaysia
- Area served: Worldwide
- Key people: Captain Nasaruddin A. Bakar (President & CEO)
- Number of employees: 14,788 (As of Oct 2026)
- Parent: Khazanah Nasional
- Subsidiaries: Malaysia Airlines; Firefly; MASkargo
- Website: www.malaysiaaviationgroup.com.my

The Malaysia Aviation Group Berhad (MAG) is a Malaysian airline holding company, based in Sepang, Selangor, owned by Khazanah Nasional, an investment arm of the Malaysian Government. Established in 2016, the group's business consists of three main divisions: Airlines, Loyalty & Travel and Aviation Services.

== History ==
The company was set up by Khazanah Nasional on 19 May 2016 to manage and restructure the Malaysia Airlines and its subsidiaries. MAG evolved from the conjoined histories of Malayan Airways, founded in 1937, and Malaysian Airways, which eventually became the present-day Malaysia Airlines.

== Subsidiaries ==
=== Malaysia Airlines ===
Malaysia Airlines is Malaysia's national flag carrier, headquartered at Kuala Lumpur International Airport. The airline flies to destinations across Europe, Oceania and Asia from its main hub at the Kuala Lumpur International Airport (KLIA).

=== Firefly ===
Firefly is a Malaysian regional and low-cost carrier, which operates domestic flights within Malaysia and to neighboring countries, including Indonesia, Singapore, Thailand and China. Its main hubs are Sultan Abdul Aziz Shah Airport in Subang and Penang International Airport in Penang, with a secondary hub at Kota Kinabalu International Airport in Sabah.

=== MASkargo ===
MASkargo is a cargo airline with its head office in the Advanced Cargo Centre (ACC) on the grounds of KLIA in Sepang District, Selangor and is the cargo division of MAS that operates scheduled, charter air cargo services as well as airport to seaport cargo logistics via ground transportation.

=== Amal ===
Amal is a charter subsidiary of the MAG, that specialises in providing travel services for Muslim pilgrims, focusing on the Hajj and Umrah pilgrimage markets. It was launched in 2019, marking Malaysia Airlines' first foray into the religious travel sector. Amal was initially conceived as a standalone entity but was later integrated into the broader Malaysia Airlines group.

=== Other subsidiaries ===
The MAG also have seven other subsidiaries, including:

- MAG Culinary
- MAB Engineering
- MAB Academy
- AeroDarat
- Enrich
- MHholidays
- Journify

=== Former subsidiaries ===
- MASwings – MASwings was a regional airline based in East Malaysia, which tasked with providing essential air connectivity to remote and rural communities in East Malaysia under the Rural Air Services (RAS) program. The airline is rebranded as AirBorneo on 2 January 2026 following the acquisition of MASwings by the Government of Sarawak.

== See also ==
- List of airline holding companies
