= General José Antonio Anzoátegui International Airport =

General José Antonio Anzoátegui International Airport Barcelona International Airport
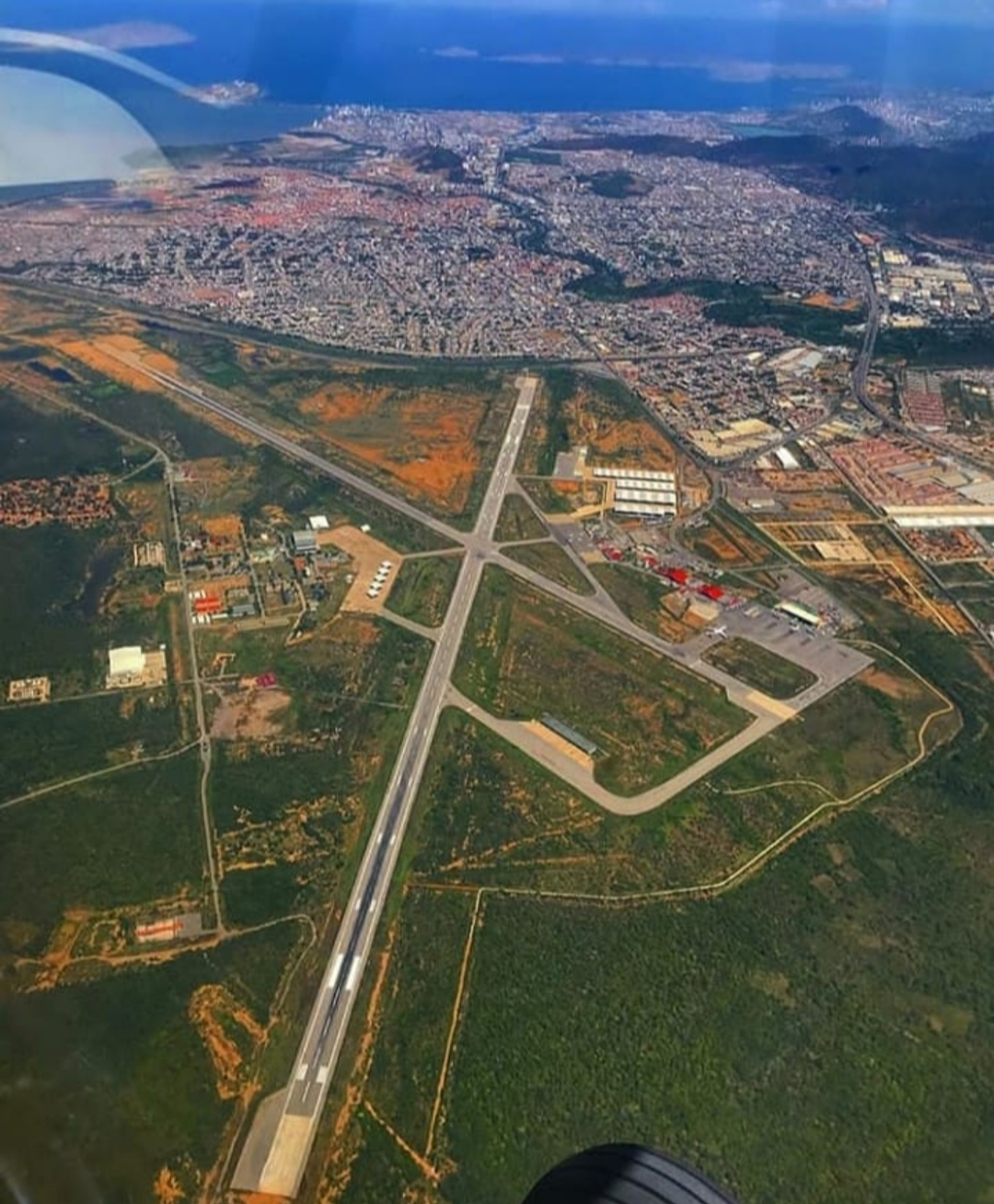
- IATA: BLA; ICAO: SVBC

Summary
- Airport type: Public
- Operator: BAER Aeropuertos
- Serves: Barcelona, Venezuela
- Hub for: Avior Airlines
- Elevation AMSL: 26 ft (7.9 m)
- Coordinates: 10°06′26″N 64°41′21″W

Map
- Location of the airport in Venezuela

Runways
Direction	Length		Surface
Direction	m	ft	Surface
02/20	3,100	10,171	Asphalt
15/33	3,150	10,335	Asphalt
- Sources: GCM Google Maps

General José Antonio Anzoátegui International Airport (IATA: BLA, ICAO: SVBC) It is the international airport of the city of Barcelona, Venezuela, capital of the Anzoátegui State. It is located in the Northeast of the country, southwest of the city center of Barcelona, about 4 km (2.5 mi) from the urban center of the city, and less than 1 km (0.62 mi) from the Caribbean Sea. It is the headquarters and main hub of the airline Avior Airlines

== Facilities ==
Runway 02/20 length includes a 300 metres (980 ft) displaced threshold on Runway 20. Runway 15/33 length includes a 240 metres (790 ft) displaced threshold and 150 metres (490 ft) overrun on Runway 33. The Barcelona VORTAC (Ident: BNA) is located 0.36 nautical miles (0.67 km) off the threshold of Runway 15.

== Airlines and destinations ==
The airport serves two domestic destinations only: Caracas and Porlamar.

Airlines	Destinations
American Eagle	Miami (begins 15 January 2027)
Copa Airlines	Panama City
Avior Airlines	Bogotá, Caracas, Medellín–JMC
Conviasa	Porlamar
LASER Airlines	Bogotá, Caracas
LATAM Colombia	Bogotá
RUTACA Airlines	Caracas

== See also ==
- Transport in Venezuela
- List of airports in Venezuela
