= New Pacific Airlines =

Charter airline of the United States

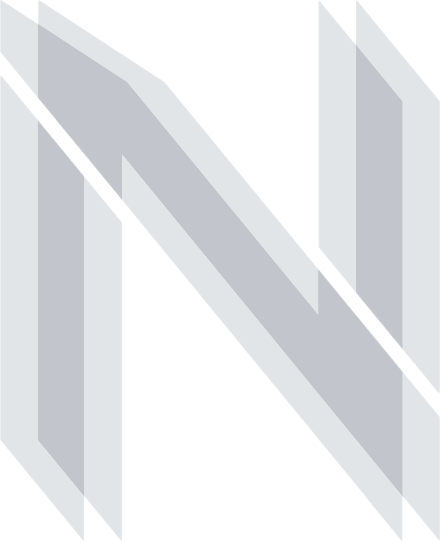

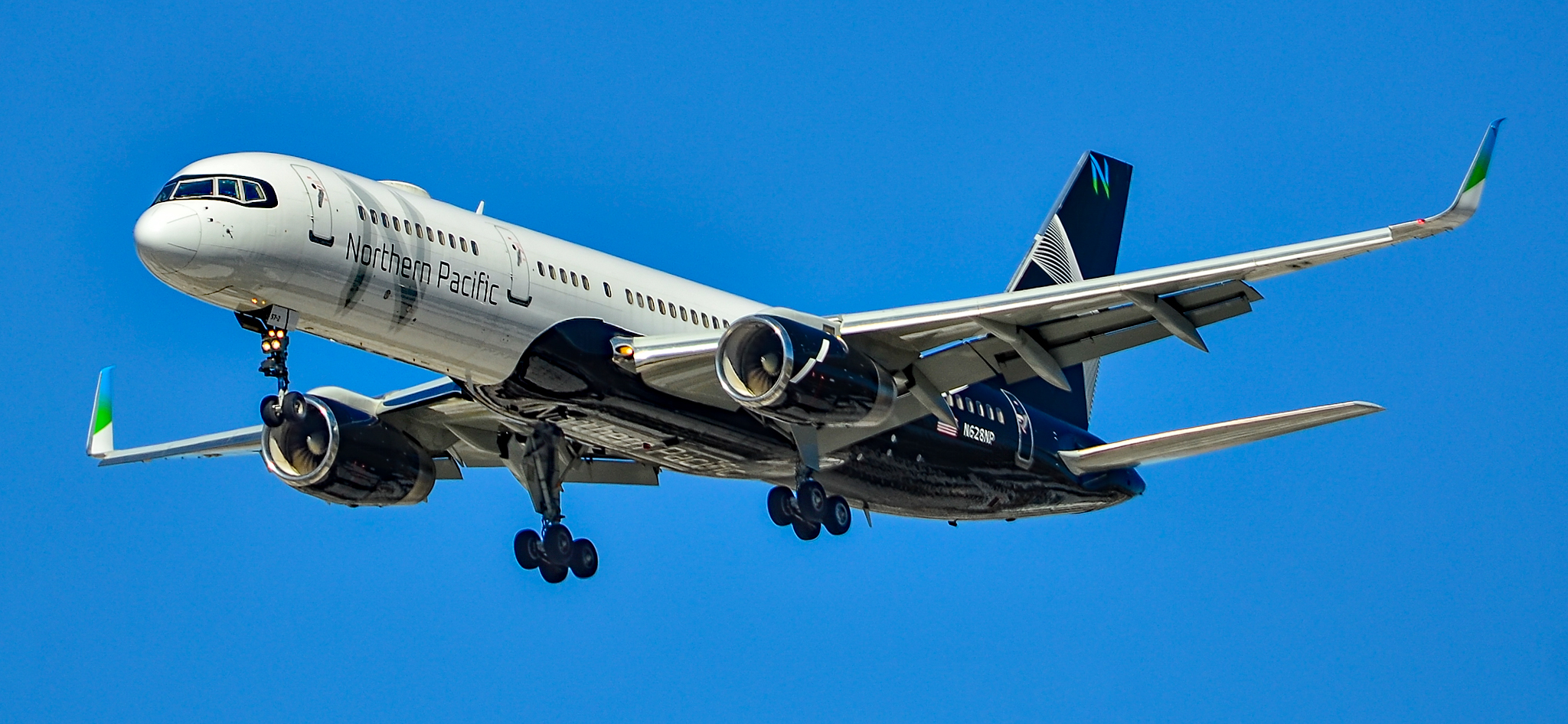
- Boeing 757-200
IATA	ICAO	Call sign
7H	RVF	RAVN FLIGHT
- Founded: May 2021; 5 years ago
- Commenced operations: July 14, 2023; 3 years ago
- Ceased operations: November 26, 2025; 9 months ago
- Operating bases: Ontario International Airport
- Frequent-flyer program: FlyCoin
- Fleet size: 9
- Parent company: FLOAT Alaska LLC
- Headquarters: Anchorage, Alaska, United States
- Key people: Tom Hsieh (CEO & President)
- Employees: 50
- Website: www.np.com

New Pacific Airlines, formerly known as Corvus Airlines and Northern Pacific Airways, was an American charter airline and former low-cost carrier based in Anchorage, Alaska.

== History ==
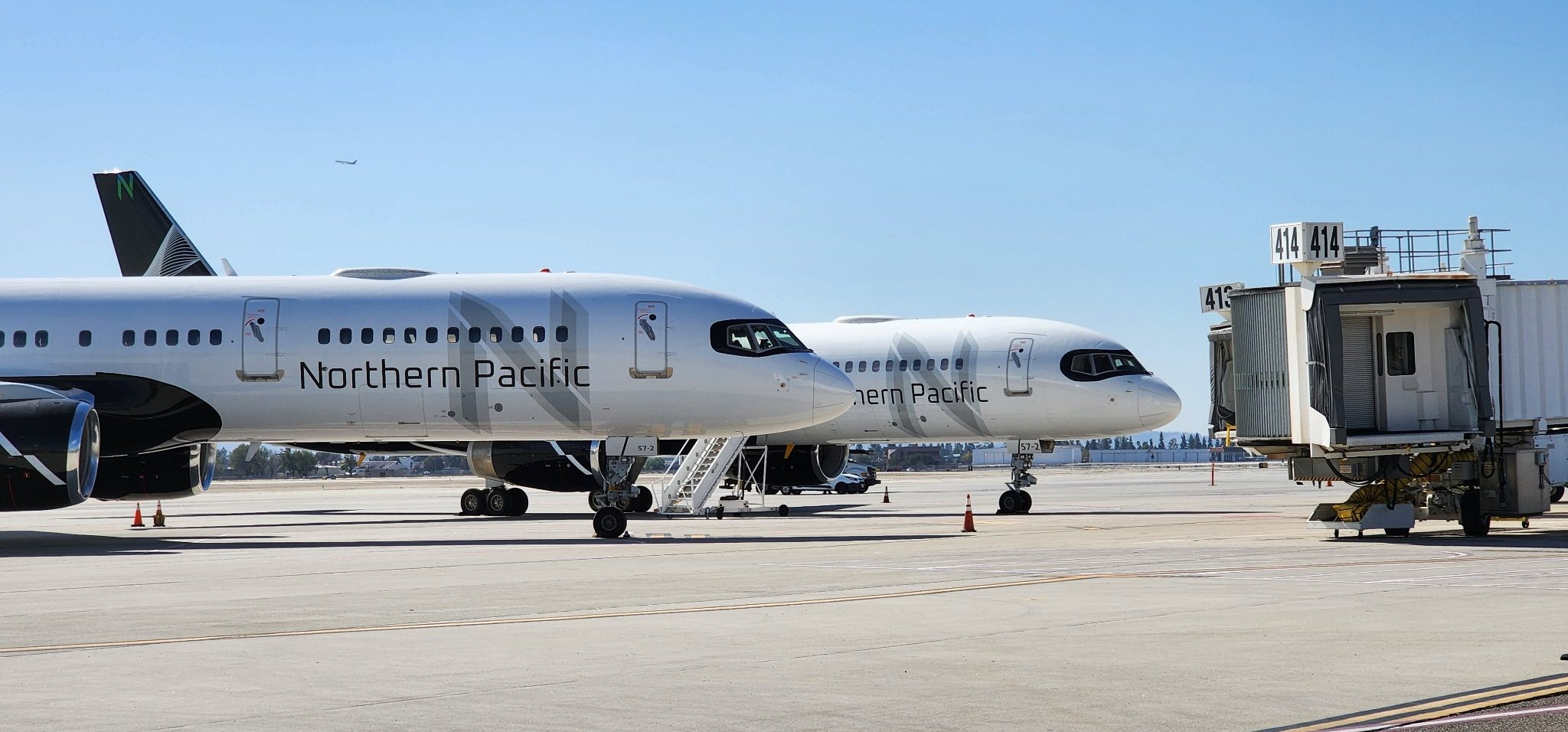
Boeing 757s in Northern Pacific Airways livery

The airline also operated inside Alaska under the brand and was the same company as Ravn Alaska until August 2025. Ravn Connect was a separate company but also a subsidiary of FLOAT Alaska. The airline planned to operate transpacific flights between North America and Asia, with a stopover at Ted Stevens Anchorage International Airport. The airline's business model was compared to that of Icelandair, allowing passengers to either quickly connect to their next flight, or to have a longer multi-day stopover at Anchorage to allow passengers to sightsee in Alaska.

In October 2022, BNSF filed a trademark infringement lawsuit against the airline for using the Northern Pacific name, which was also the name of the Northern Pacific Railroad that stretched from Minnesota to the Pacific Northwest and was subsequently merged with BNSF's predecessor, Burlington Northern Railroad.

The airline received its full FAA authorization to launch flights on July 9, 2023, allowing the airline to launch commercial flights with passengers aboard. Operations commenced on July 14, 2023, with their inaugural flight from Ontario International Airport in Ontario, California, to Harry Reid International Airport in Las Vegas, Nevada.

On August 28, 2023, the airline was issued a preliminary injunction regarding the trademark infringement case from BNSF, ordering the airline to cease use of the Northern Pacific name. While there was an opportunity to appeal the decision, it decided not to and instead opted to rebrand as New Pacific Airlines, after a call for employees to provide suggestions for a new name. The new name was chosen in order to avoid changing existing branding assets, such as the "N" logo which had been affixed on every seat on board the airline's aircraft and the airline's website domain. While the airline began to use the new name, it had not yet received regulatory approval for the change, which meant that tickets sold still displayed the old Northern Pacific name.

In April 2024, New Pacific Airlines announced it would end all remaining scheduled flights and focus on charter operations entirely.

On November 26, 2025, in an e-mail to employees, President Thomas Hsieh announced the airline would be ceasing operations that day. On January 26, 2026, Float Alaska, the parent company of New Pacific Airlines, filed for Chapter 11 bankruptcy protection, listing assets between $1 million and $10 million and liabilities between $10 million and $50 million.

In March 2026, the company's remaining 3 757s were auctioned off.

== Destinations ==
New Pacific Airlines started operations flying between Las Vegas and Ontario due to the ongoing closure of Russian airspace and delays in certification from Korean and Japanese authorities. The airline originally also announced plans to fly to destinations such as Tokyo, Osaka, Seoul, Los Angeles, Las Vegas, San Francisco, New York City and Orlando from Ted Stevens Anchorage International Airport.

The airline previously operated to the following destinations as of March 2024:

Country (State)	City	Airport	Start date	End date	Notes	Ref
United States (California)	Ontario	Ontario International Airport	July 14, 2023	March 29, 2024	Terminated	
United States (Nevada)	Las Vegas	Harry Reid International Airport	July 14, 2023	January 1, 2024	Terminated	
United States (Nevada)	Reno	Reno–Tahoe International Airport	November 16, 2023	March 23, 2024	Terminated	
United States (Tennessee)	Nashville	Nashville International Airport	November 17, 2023	March 29, 2024	Terminated	

=== Interline agreements ===
- Hahn Air

== Fleet ==
At the time of its closure, New Pacific Airlines operated the following aircraft:

New Pacific Airlines fleet
Aircraft	In service	Orders	Passengers			Notes
Aircraft	In service	Orders	F	Y	Total	Notes
Boeing 757-200	3	—	78		78	
de Havilland Canada DHC-8-100	5	—				
de Havilland Canada DHC-8-300	1	—				
Total	9	—				

=== Fleet development ===
New Pacific unveiled its first Boeing 757-200 on January 18, 2022. As of September 2022, New Pacific owned four 757-200s and had plans to acquire more which were used by American Airlines, with plans to have twelve aircraft by the date of their transpacific launch.

== See also ==
- List of defunct airlines of the United States
