= Avior Regional =

Venezuelan airline

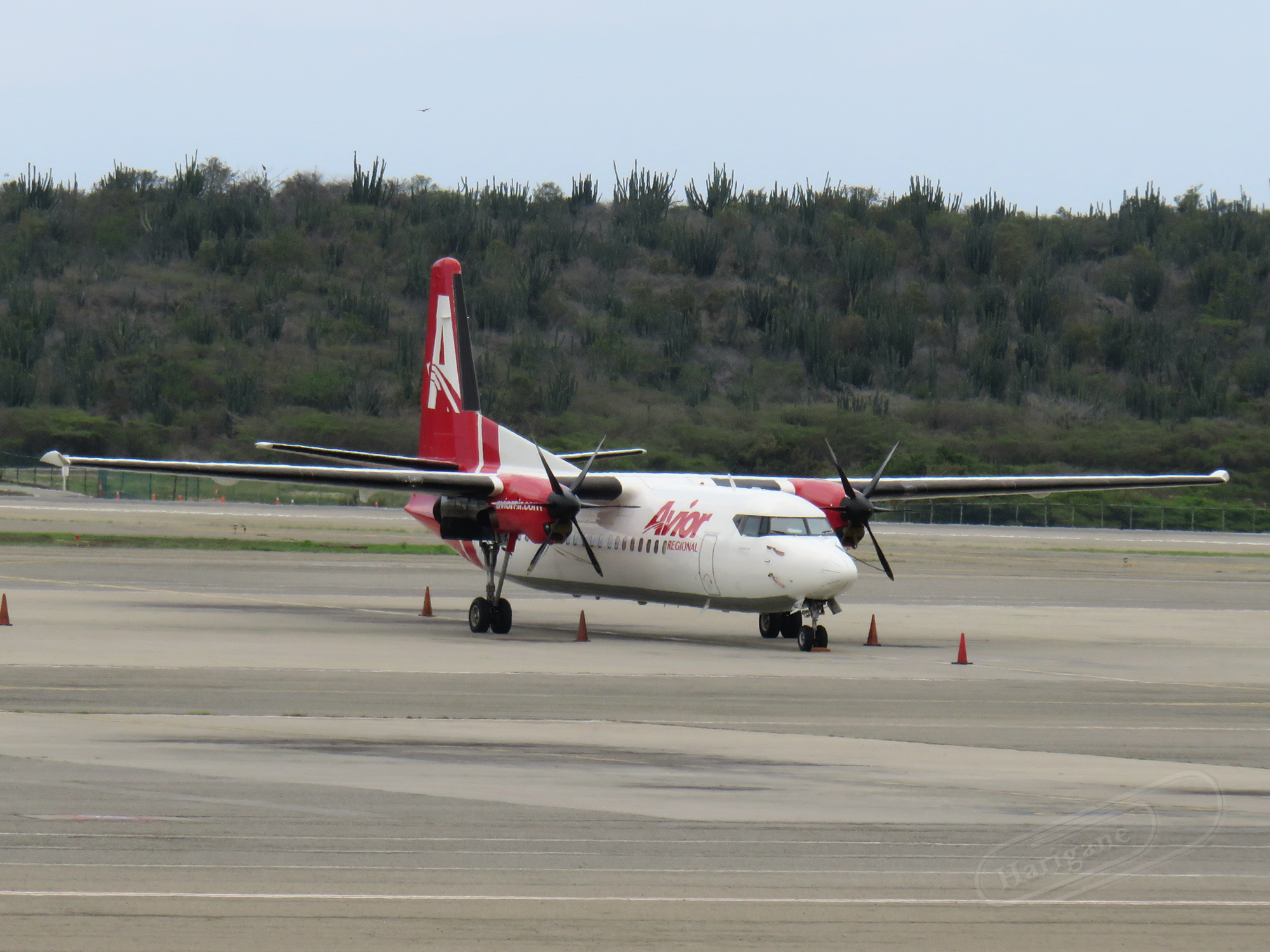
IATA	ICAO	Call sign
3R	RGR	AVIOR REGIONAL
- Founded: March 7, 2015
- Commenced operations: March 11, 2015
- Ceased operations: December 2, 2016
- Hubs: Barinas Airport
- Frequent-flyer program: AviorPlus
- Fleet size: 6
- Destinations: 4
- Parent company: Avior Airlines
- Headquarters: Barinas, Venezuela
- Key people: Gianfranco Fariña (President)
- Website: www.aviorair.com

Avior Regional was a Venezuelan regional airline that was a subsidiary of Avior Airlines. It began operations in March 2015 with flights from Caracas to Barinas, Valera as well as Curaçao.

== History ==
In 2012, after the bankruptcy and subsequent restoration of Avior Airlines that took place between 2007 and 2009, company executives proposed the creation of a regional subsidiary that would cover the demand for all destinations previously operated by its parent company.

On March 7, 2015, Avior Airlines announced the launch of subsidiary Avior Regional, which was intended to expand the parent company's domestic operations. Flights commenced four days later, operating from Caracas to Barinas and Valera. Avior Regional started flights to its first international destination, Curaçao, on July 16, 2015.

Since December 2, 2016, the airline has not provided commercial operations, it specified that the suspension was due to a restructuring with the purpose of improving air connectivity in regions to which Barinas and Valera offered services.

== Destinations ==
Avior Regional flies to the following destinations as of July 2015:

Country	City	Airport	Notes	Refs
Curaçao	Willemstad	Curaçao International Airport		
Venezuela	Barinas	Barinas Airport	Hub	
Venezuela	Caracas	Simón Bolívar International Airport		
Venezuela	Valera	Dr. Antonio Nicolás Briceño Airport		

== Fleet ==
The airline operated the following aircraft as of September 2016:

Avior Regional fleet
Aircraft	In service	Orders	Passengers			Notes
Aircraft	In service	Orders	C	Y	Total	Notes
Fokker 50	6	—	–	50	50	
Total	6	—				

== See also ==
- List of defunct airlines of Venezuela
