= Firefly (airline) =

Low-cost airline of Malaysia

- Firefly Boeing 737-800
IATA	ICAO	Call sign
FY	FFM	FIREFLY
- Founded: 16 March 2007; 19 years ago
- Commenced operations: 3 April 2007; 19 years ago
- Hubs: Kuala Lumpur–Subang; Penang
- Secondary hubs: Kota Kinabalu
- Frequent-flyer program: Enrich
- Fleet size: 14
- Parent company: Malaysia Airlines
- Headquarters: Petaling Jaya, Selangor, Malaysia
- Key people: Hamdan Che Ismail (COO)
- Website: www.fireflyz.com.my

Firefly (stylized as firefly) is a Malaysian regional and low-cost carrier. It operates as a wholly owned subsidiary of the Malaysia Aviation Group (MAG), alongside Malaysia Airlines, MASkargo and Amal. Established on 3 April 2007 as a regional carrier, the airline operates domestic flights within Malaysia and to neighboring countries, including Indonesia, Singapore, Thailand and China. Its main hubs are Sultan Abdul Aziz Shah Airport in Subang and Penang International Airport in Penang, with a secondary hub at Kota Kinabalu International Airport in Sabah.

Firefly's fleet includes ATR 72-500 turboprop aircraft for short-haul routes and Boeing 737-800 aircraft for medium-haul and higher-capacity services. After a decade-long hiatus, the airline resumed jet operations in 2021, repositioning itself as a low-cost subsidiary of Malaysia Airlines and significantly expanding its network and service offerings. As part of the Malaysia Aviation Group (MAG), Firefly complements Malaysia Airlines by focusing on point-to-point connectivity, serving secondary cities and underserved routes.

== History ==
=== 2007–2010: Formation and early expansion ===
Firefly commenced operations on April 3, 2007, with its inaugural flight from Penang International Airport to Kota Bharu. Initially, the airline operated a fleet of two 50-seater Fokker 50 aircraft. A third leased Fokker 50 was later added to support service expansion. Firefly's early strategy focused on connecting underserved domestic markets, such as Langkawi, Alor Setar and Kuala Terengganu, with regional hubs like Penang and Subang.

In June 2007, Firefly's parent company, Malaysia Airlines, signed an agreement to acquire ten ATR 72-500 turboprop aircraft, with an option for ten additional units. The first ATR 72-500s began arriving in August 2008, replacing the aging Fokker 50 fleet. By the end of 2008, all Fokker 50 aircraft had been retired, marking a transition to a fully modernized fleet. The delivery of the ATR 72-500s continued, with five aircraft delivered in 2008, five in 2009, four in 2010, and the remaining six by 2011.

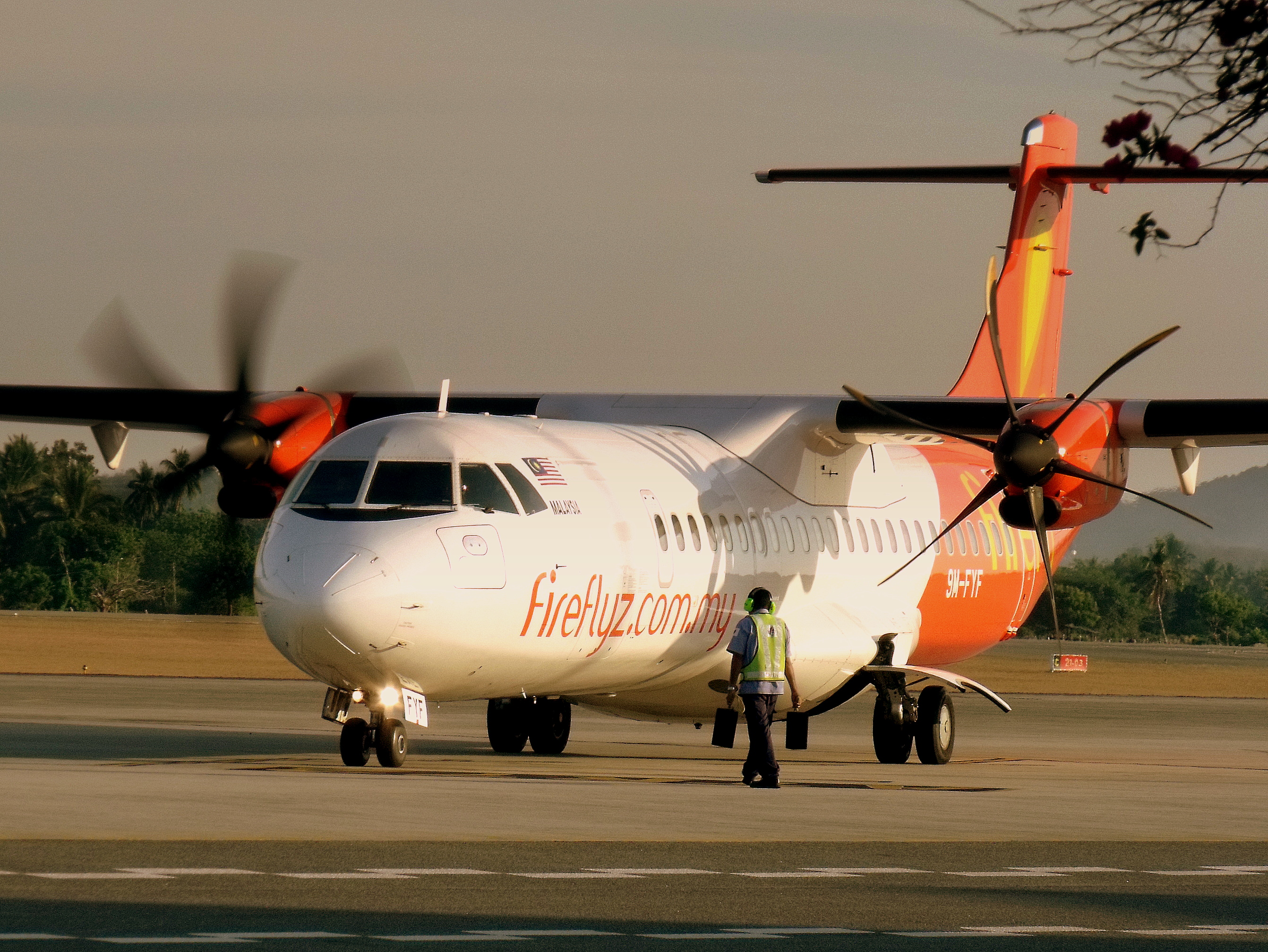
Firefly ATR 72–500 at Langkawi International Airport

To further enhance its operational capabilities, Firefly introduced the ATR 72-600 model in 2009. This upgraded version featured improved fuel efficiency, better passenger comfort and an increased seating capacity of up to 78 passengers compared to the ATR 72-500. The addition of these aircraft allowed the airline to expand its domestic route network and increase service frequency on high-demand routes. By the end of 2009, Firefly's fleet consisted of ten ATR 72-500s and two ATR 72-600s, solidifying its position as a key player in Malaysia's regional aviation market.

=== 2010–2011: Introduction of jet operations ===
In 2010, Firefly made a strategic decision to diversify its fleet and operations by entering the jet market. The airline placed an order for 30 Boeing 737-800 aircraft, marking a significant shift in its business model. The new Boeing jets were intended to provide the airline with the capacity to operate on longer domestic and regional routes, allowing Firefly to compete with established low-cost carriers such as AirAsia. The first Boeing 737-800 was delivered in December 2010, and by January 2011, Firefly had begun operating its first jet routes, focusing primarily on domestic destinations like Kuala Lumpur, Kuching and Kota Kinabalu, along with international flights to Bandung and Surabaya.

However, the decision to enter the jet market proved challenging. The competitive landscape in Malaysia's aviation sector became more intense, especially with the rapid expansion of budget airlines like AirAsia and the emergence of Malindo Air in 2013. Firefly struggled to maintain profitability with its jet operations, as aggressive pricing strategies from competitors put significant pressure on the airline's yields and load factors. The challenges were compounded by operational inefficiencies and high costs associated with running a dual fleet of turboprop and jet aircraft.

As a result, in August 2011, Firefly announced that it would cease its jet operations by the end of the year. The decision to withdraw from the jet market was made in consultation with its parent company, Malaysia Airlines, and in response to a restructuring agreement between Malaysia Airlines and AirAsia. The airline officially returned all Boeing 737-800 aircraft to Malaysia Airlines and refocused its operations on turboprop services using ATR 72 aircraft.

=== 2012–2019: Consolidation, market positioning, and financial struggles ===
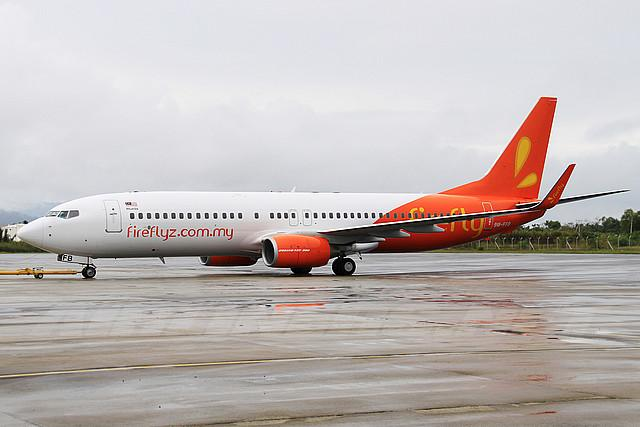
A former Firefly Boeing 737-800 in its previous livery

Following the cessation of Firefly's jet operations in 2011, the airline refocused on its core regional turboprop services. Several planned turboprop route expansions were also shelved, including services to Bangkok–Don Mueang (via Kota Bharu), Bengkulu, Jambi and Pangkalpinang.

Its fleet expansion plans nevertheless included an order by parent company Malaysia Airlines in December 2012 for 36 ATR 72-600 aircraft, with 20 allocated to Firefly and 16 to MASwings. These modernised aircraft were intended to strengthen Firefly's domestic and regional connectivity by enhancing its short-haul operating capabilities. However, two Boeing 737-400 jets remained under Firefly's charter division until they were retired in 2014.

Challenges soon arose when contractual disputes between Malaysia Airlines and the Ministry of Transport Malaysia over MASwings' use of the new ATR 72-600 aircraft for Rural Air Services (RAS) subsidies delayed further deliveries. Compounding these issues, Malaysia Airlines faced severe financial difficulties starting in 2015, which led to the cancellation of the remaining ATR 72-600 orders. By 2016, Firefly retired all eight of its newly delivered ATR 72-600 aircraft and scaled back its expansion plans as it struggled to maintain operations in an increasingly competitive market.

During this period, Firefly faced significant competition from emerging carriers such as Malindo Air, which entered the market in 2013 and rapidly expanded its domestic and regional networks. This competition, combined with aggressive pricing strategies from carriers like AirAsia, placed considerable pressure on Firefly's market share and profitability. By 2018, Firefly reported a net loss of RM49.41 million, contributing only 3.35% of the Malaysia Aviation Group's (MAG) total revenue.

In response, MAG initiated a strategic review of its subsidiaries to identify potential areas for improvement. Firefly's role was reassessed as part of MAG's Long-Term Business Plan (LTBP), announced in 2019, which identified the airline as a key component in the recovery of Malaysia's aviation sector. The plan emphasized leveraging Firefly's strengths in regional operations and underserved routes, with discussions also exploring the potential reintroduction of jet services to improve competitiveness in the low-cost carrier market. However, these efforts were constrained by limited resources and a need for financial restructuring across the group.

=== 2020–2021: Impact of the COVID-19 pandemic and resumption of operations ===
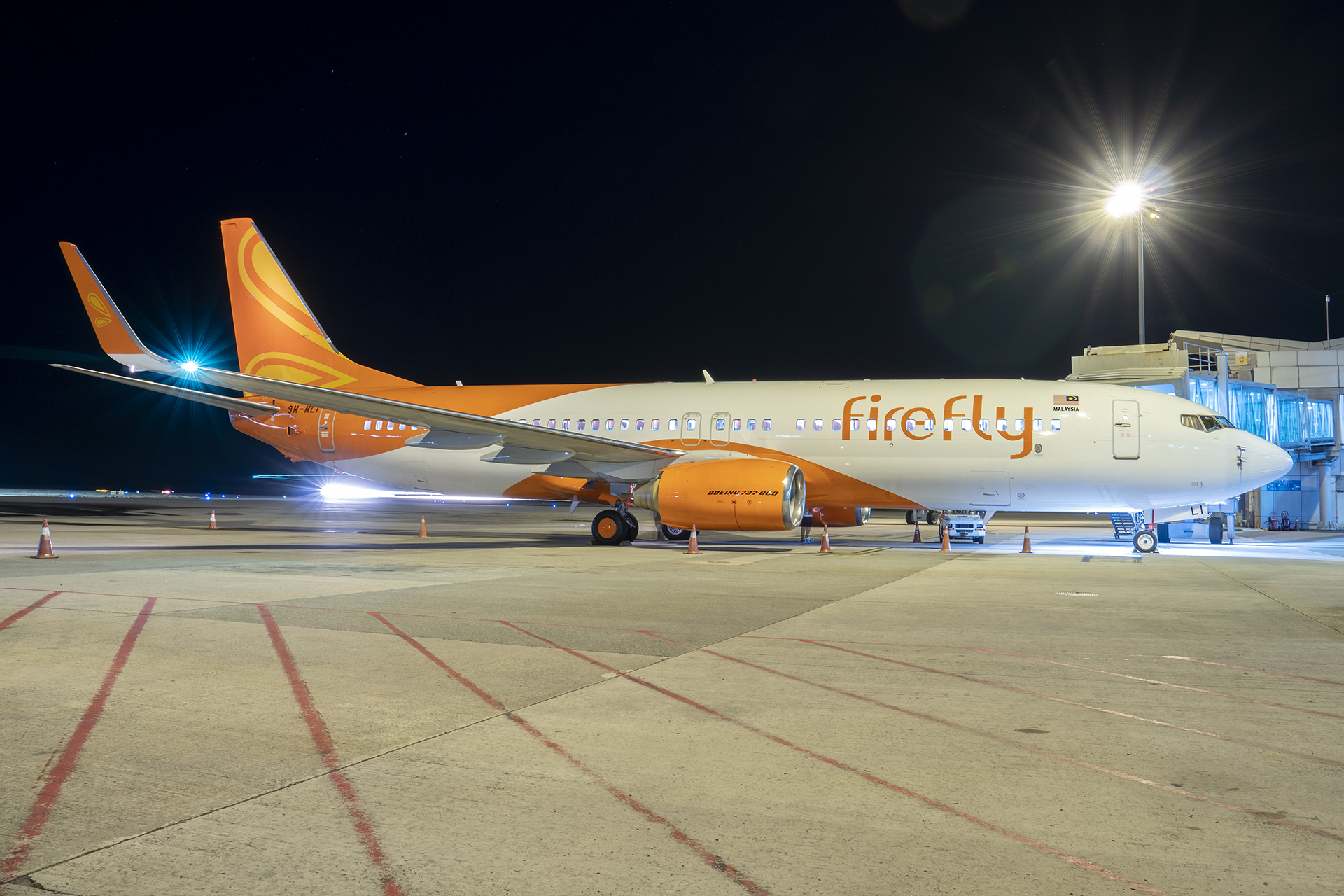
Firefly's Boeing 737-800 in the airline's updated livery

The global COVID-19 pandemic, which began in early 2020, severely impacted the airline industry, including Firefly. Travel restrictions led to significant reductions in both domestic and international flight frequencies. In response, Firefly temporarily suspended many of its operations.

As the pandemic situation improved and travel demand began to recover, Firefly resumed its jet operations in January 2021. The airline reintroduced Boeing 737-800 aircraft to its fleet, focusing on domestic routes from Penang International Airport to key destinations such as Kota Kinabalu, Kuching and Johor Bahru. This marked a new phase for the airline as it sought to capitalise on the growing demand for domestic travel in the post-pandemic recovery period.

=== 2022–present: Fleet expansion, regional growth, and strategic goals ===
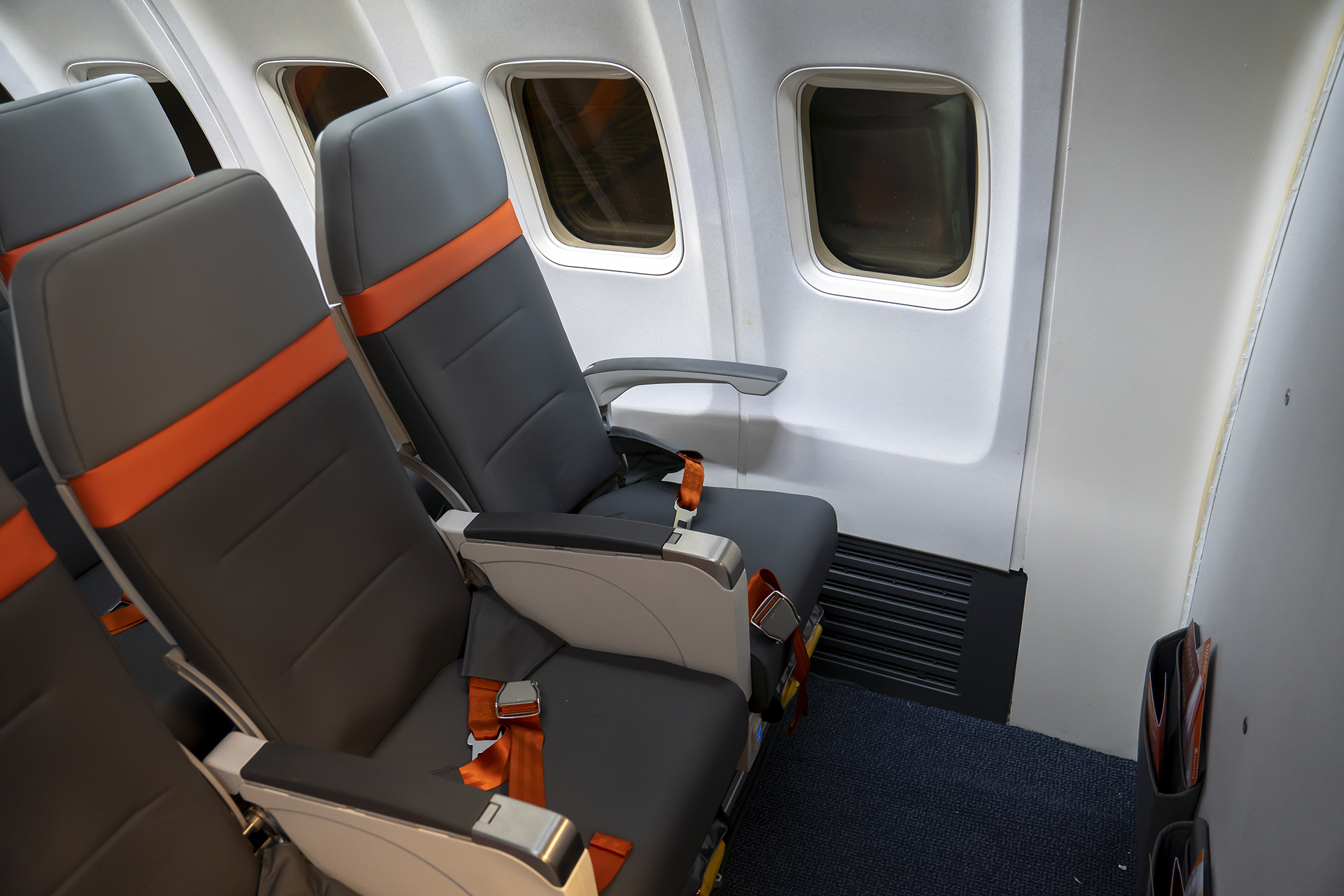
Interior of Firefly's Boeing 737-800 featuring the airline's current seating configuration

In 2022, Firefly continued to expand its fleet with the addition of more Boeing 737-800 aircraft. The airline's plan was to operate up to ten narrow-body jets by 2025, enhancing its capacity for both domestic and regional operations. Firefly introduced new routes from Penang to various destinations, including direct flights to Kota Kinabalu and Kuching, and began preparations for resuming international flights as travel restrictions eased further.

In 2023, Firefly designated Kota Kinabalu International Airport as its secondary hub to enhance connectivity across Borneo. As part of a strategic realignment by parent company Malaysia Airlines, Firefly took over intra-Borneo jet services, including routes connecting Kota Kinabalu with Kuching, Tawau and Sandakan, as well as Kuching with Miri.

In addition to its domestic expansion, Firefly prioritised strengthening its regional presence. Plans were announced to launch new international routes to Singapore, Thailand and other Southeast Asian markets. The airline also focused on improving service quality and offering competitive pricing to rebuild its customer base.

On 16 June 2024, Firefly resumed flights to Kuala Lumpur International Airport with a Boeing 737-800 after 13 years of hiatus. This is the first time it has operated flights to the main airport since it ceased jet operations in 2011.

By 2024, Firefly had set ambitious goals for profitability, aiming to recover lost ground and achieve sustainable growth. The airline planned to further expand its network, targeting new markets in Japan and South Korea by 2025. Additionally, Firefly sought to enhance the customer experience by improving onboard services and optimizing its operations. The airline's strategic goals for 2024 included increasing profitability, expanding its market share, and positioning itself as a key player in Southeast Asia's aviation market.

== Destinations ==
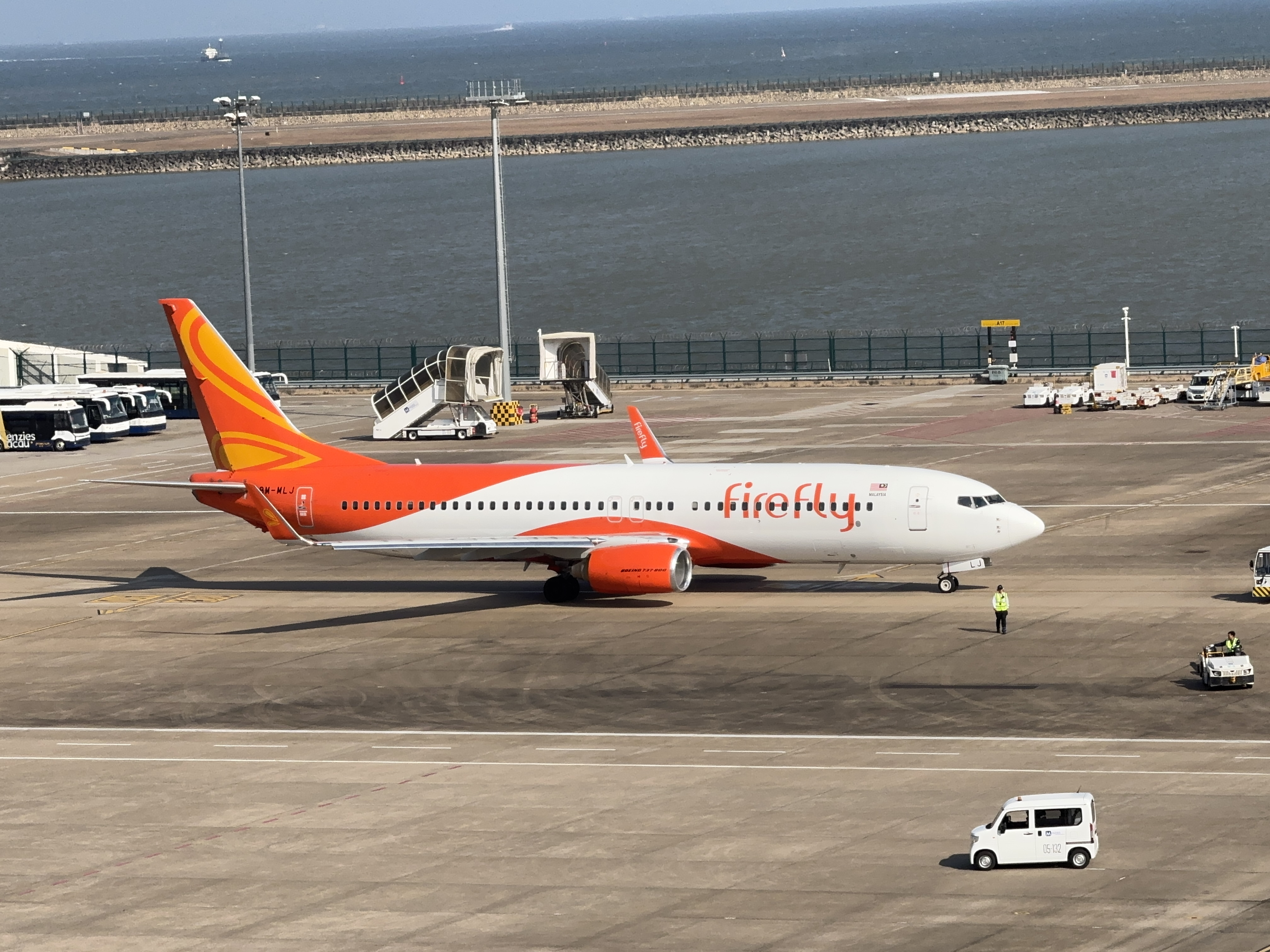
Firefly Boeing 737-800 at Macau International Airport

As of August 2026, Firefly have served these following destinations:

Country	City	Airport	Notes	Refs
Indonesia	Banda Aceh	Sultan Iskandar Muda International Airport		
Malaysia	Johor Bahru	Senai International Airport		
Malaysia	Kota Bharu	Sultan Ismail Petra Airport		
Malaysia	Kuala Lumpur	Sultan Abdul Aziz Shah Airport	Hub	
Malaysia	Sibu	Sibu Airport		
Malaysia	Alor Setar	Sultan Abdul Halim Airport		
Malaysia	Kota Kinabalu	Kota Kinabalu International Airport		
Malaysia	Kuala Terengganu	Sultan Mahmud Airport		
Malaysia	Kuching	Kuching International Airport		
Malaysia	Langkawi	Langkawi International Airport		
Malaysia	Penang	Penang International Airport		
Malaysia	Tawau	Tawau Airport		
Philippines	Cebu	Mactan–Cebu International Airport		
Singapore	Singapore	Changi Airport		
Singapore	Singapore	Seletar Airport		
Thailand	Krabi	Krabi International Airport		
Thailand	Phuket	Phuket International Airport		

=== Codeshare agreements ===
Firefly has codeshare agreements with Malaysia Airlines.

== Fleet ==
=== Current fleet ===
As of July 2026, Firefly operates the following aircraft:

Firefly fleet
Aircraft	In service	Orders	Passengers	Notes
ATR 72-500	9	—	72	
Boeing 737-800	5	3	189	Transferred from Malaysia Airlines.
Total	14	3		

=== Fleet development ===
Firefly's fleet has evolved to align with its strategic goals. Initially operating two Fokker 50 turboprops, the airline transitioned to ATR 72 aircraft by 2008, retiring all Fokker 50s. In 2010, Firefly introduced Boeing 737-800 jets to expand into regional markets but ceased jet operations in 2011 as part of a restructuring by Malaysia Airlines.

The airline resumed jet operations in 2022 with Boeing 737-800 aircraft, establishing Penang and Kota Kinabalu as key hubs. Firefly's current fleet consists of ATR 72 turboprops and Boeing 737-800 jets, supporting its dual focus on regional and domestic connectivity.

=== Former fleet ===
As of August 2025, Firefly operated 9 ATR 72-500 and 5 Boeing 737-800.

== See also ==
- List of airlines of Malaysia
- Transport in Malaysia

== Bibliography ==
- Karim, F.N., "Firefly to start services April 2", Business Times, 15 March 2006
- Yeow, J. & Francis, I., "MAS to launch Firefly", The Sun, 15 March 2006
