= Kencargo Airlines International =

Kenyan cargo airline

IATA	ICAO	Call sign
-	-	-
- Founded: 2001
- Ceased operations: 2004
- Parent company: Kenya Airways

Kencargo Airlines International was a cargo airline based in Kenya. As at incorporation, the company's shareholding was as follows:

- Kenya Airways: 60%
- KLM: 20%
- Martinair: 20%.

It ceased operations in 2004, when Kenya Airways acquired all the shares held by the other joint venture partners, formed Kenya Airways Cargo and transferred Kencargo's business to the new entity.
