= Valera =

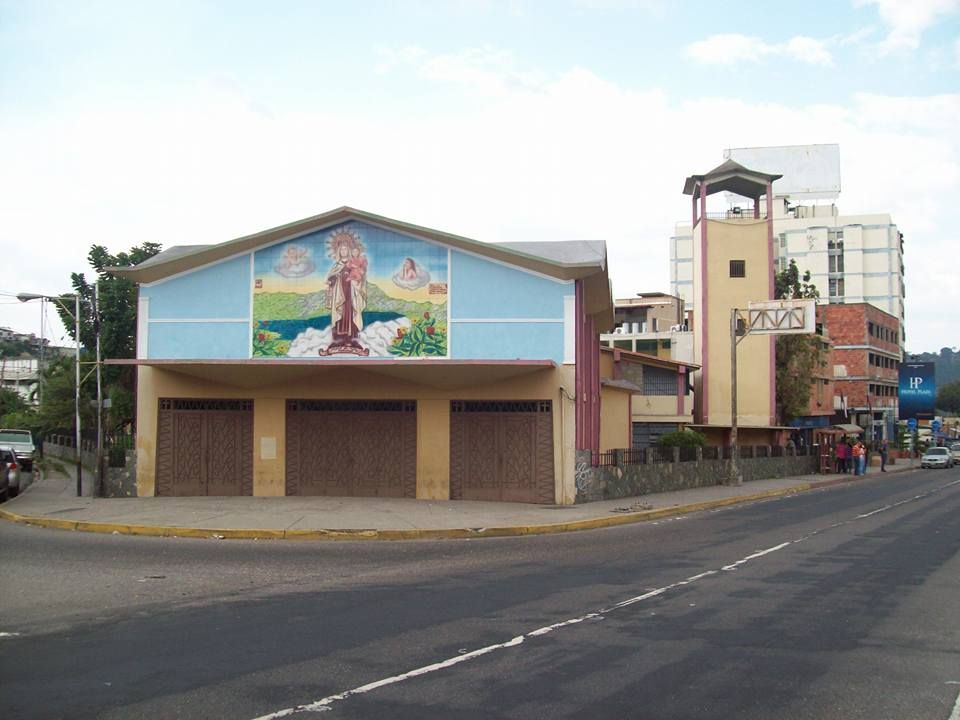
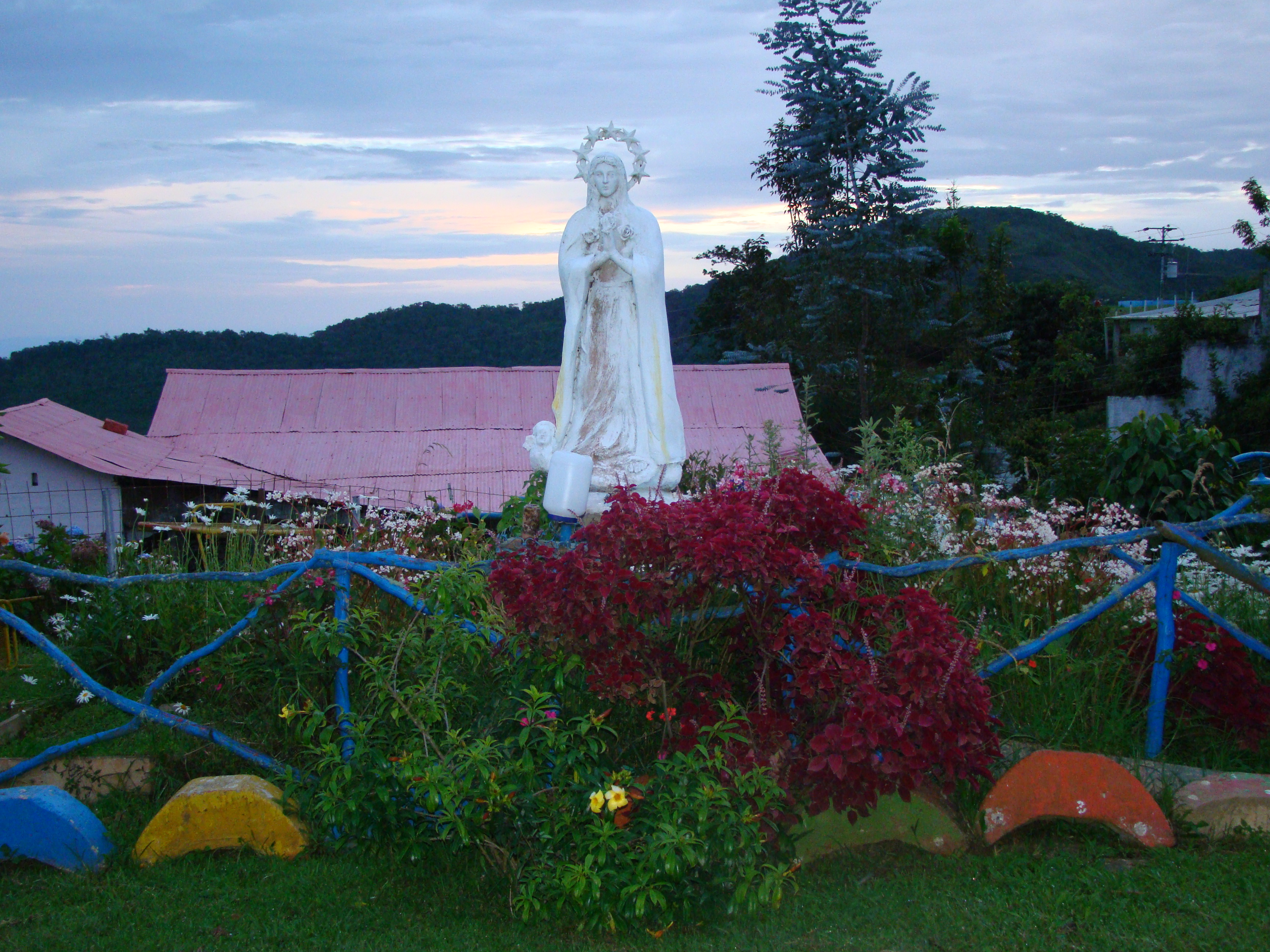
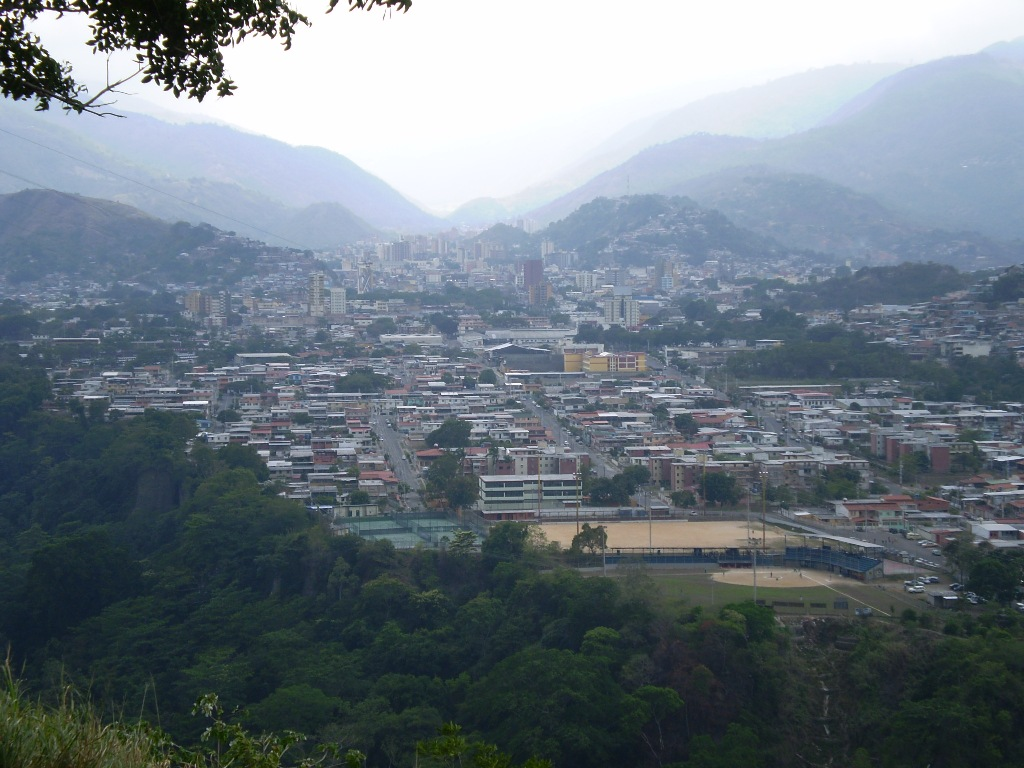
- N. S. del Carmen Parish, Cottage and Panoramic.

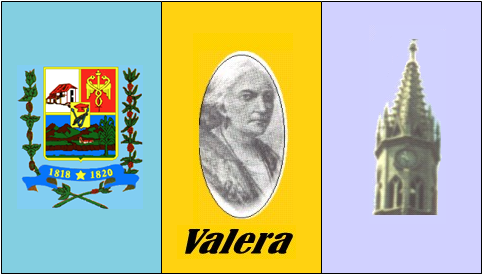
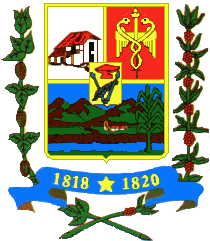
- Flag Coat of arms
- Nickname: La ciudad de las siete colinas (The City of the seven hills) or La novia de Venezuela
- Location within Venezuela
- Coordinates: 9°18′45″N 70°36′25″W
- Country: Venezuela
- State: Trujillo
- Counties: Valera Municipality
- Demonym: Valerano/a

Area
  - Total: 226.45 km^{2} (87.43 sq mi)
- Elevation: 650 m (2,130 ft)

Population (2011)
  - Total: 135,215
  - Density: 597.12/km^{2} (1,546.5/sq mi)
- Postal code: 3101
- Area code: 271
- Climate: Aw

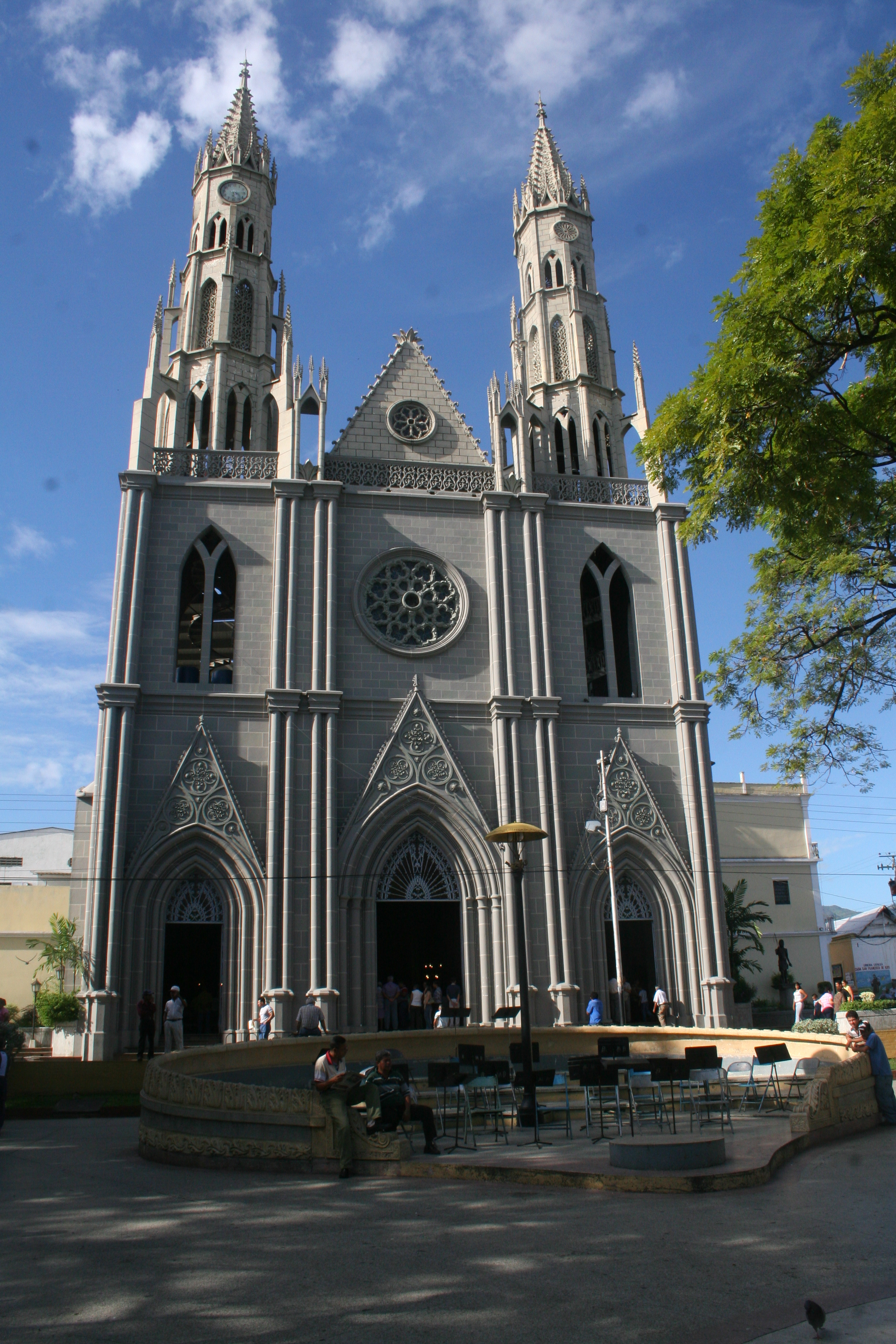
Valera Cathedral in Valera Bolivar Square

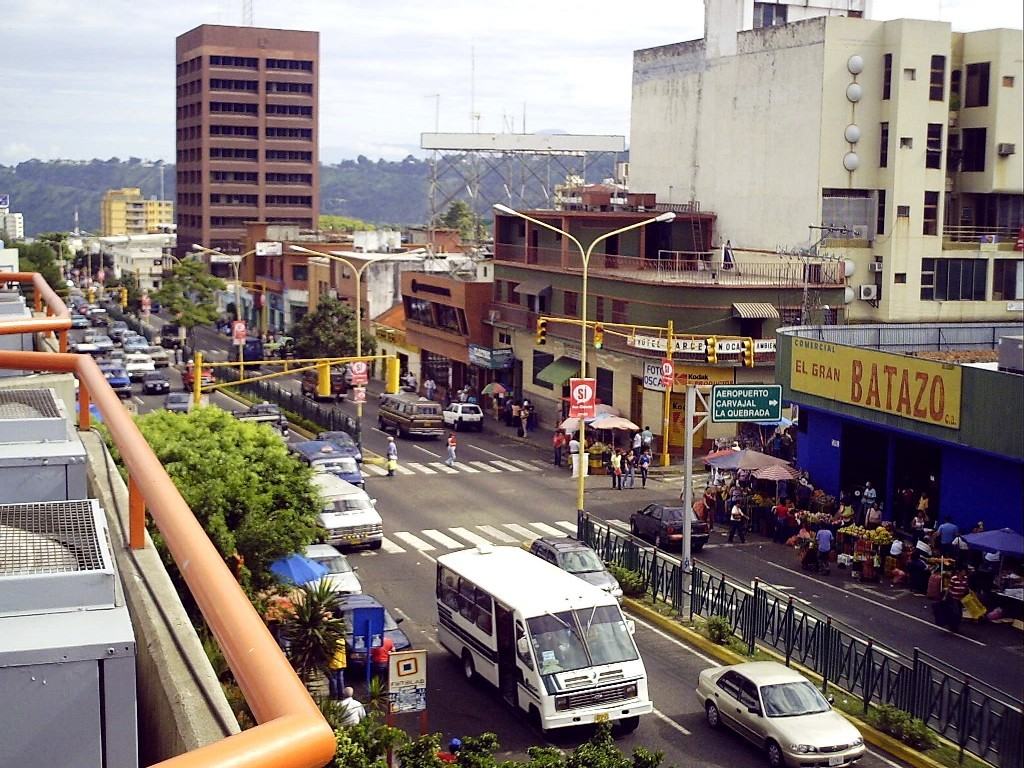
Downtown Valera

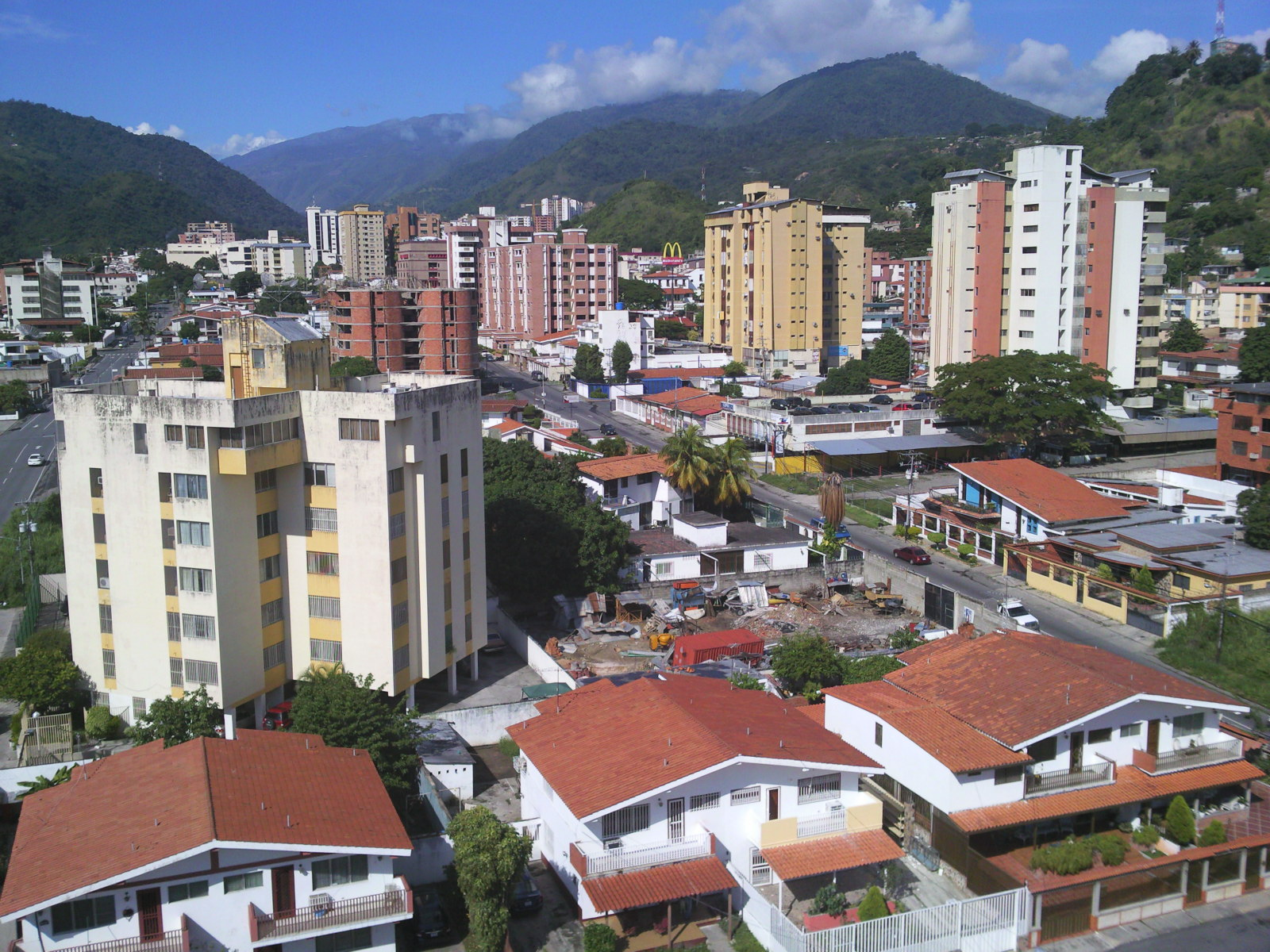
View of Las Acacia area

Valera is a city in Trujillo State in Venezuela, situated between the rivers Momboy and Motatán. The current mayor is José Karkom, who has had that post since 2013. The city is home to Italian, Portuguese, Chinese, Colombian and Spanish communities. It is also home to the Universidad Valle del Momboy, a private university, as well as the Instituto Universitario de Tecnología de Trujillo (IUTET). Also, the Universidad Nacional Experimental Simón Rodríguez (UNESR), the Universidad Pedagógica Experimental Libertador (UPEL), among others.

== Economy ==
The city is the commercial center of Trujillo state, and a gateway to the Andes region of Venezuela. It has a vibrant business community, as well as a diverse and educated workforce. As the economic and commercial center of Trujillo state, Valera is a leading distribution centre for the agricultural products in Venezuela, in which sugarcane, cacao, coffee, fruit, and grains are cultivated. Flour milling is a principal industry. The area has traditionally supplied about one-fourth of the nation's wheat. Valera has modern commercial buildings, such as: Plaza mall, Arichuna mall, Centro Comercial las Acacias, CC Edivica, CC.Vigen del Carmen, CC Diego Andres, CC Canaima, Ateneo (cultural activity), Hotels, Avenues, Park of Illustrious (Parque de Los Ilustres) and Agricultural Fair Park (Parque Ferial Agropecuario), named for its founders.

== History ==
Valera has its name from Marcos Valera. The date of its founding is not certain, although several historians agree that it was founded on 25 August 1811. Others say that it was in 1817 on land owned by Doña Mercedes Diaz de Teran and Dr. Gabriel Briceno. The location of Valera is privileged for its commercial and industrial development, because it is a point of intersection between the routes: Mérida - Maracaibo - Caracas - San Cristóbal.

== Climate ==
Valera has a tropical savanna climate (Köppen climate classification: Aw) with consistent warm temperatures and a moderate amount of precipitation. The period from April to November sees significant amounts of rainfall, while the dry season from December to March sees significantly lower precipitation.

Climate data for Valera (1991–2020)
Month	Jan	Feb	Mar	Apr	May	Jun	Jul	Aug	Sep	Oct	Nov	Dec	Year
Record high °C (°F)	35.3 (95.5)	36.5 (97.7)	37.4 (99.3)	37.4 (99.3)	35.2 (95.4)	36.8 (98.2)	36.2 (97.2)	35.7 (96.3)	39.5 (103.1)	37.6 (99.7)	35.2 (95.4)	34.8 (94.6)	39.5 (103.1)
Mean daily maximum °C (°F)	29.8 (85.6)	30.6 (87.1)	30.6 (87.1)	30.3 (86.5)	30.2 (86.4)	30.2 (86.4)	30.3 (86.5)	30.7 (87.3)	30.2 (86.4)	29.4 (84.9)	29.1 (84.4)	29.2 (84.6)	30.1 (86.2)
Daily mean °C (°F)	24.1 (75.4)	24.7 (76.5)	25.2 (77.4)	25.4 (77.7)	25.5 (77.9)	25.3 (77.5)	25.2 (77.4)	25.3 (77.5)	25.2 (77.4)	24.7 (76.5)	24.4 (75.9)	24.2 (75.6)	24.9 (76.8)
Mean daily minimum °C (°F)	20.4 (68.7)	21.0 (69.8)	21.5 (70.7)	22.3 (72.1)	22.6 (72.7)	22.3 (72.1)	22.0 (71.6)	22.1 (71.8)	22.0 (71.6)	21.9 (71.4)	21.7 (71.1)	21.0 (69.8)	21.7 (71.1)
Record low °C (°F)	16.1 (61.0)	17.2 (63.0)	17.5 (63.5)	18.0 (64.4)	18.5 (65.3)	17.2 (63.0)	15.2 (59.4)	16.7 (62.1)	17.4 (63.3)	18.6 (65.5)	18.2 (64.8)	17.2 (63.0)	15.2 (59.4)
Average precipitation mm (inches)	48.4 (1.91)	42.8 (1.69)	66.6 (2.62)	103.7 (4.08)	104.7 (4.12)	99.6 (3.92)	84.7 (3.33)	127.9 (5.04)	156.5 (6.16)	156.5 (6.16)	101.2 (3.98)	46.0 (1.81)	1,138.6 (44.83)
Average precipitation days (≥ 1.0 mm)	4.6	4.5	6.9	10.7	11.3	11.5	11.1	12.2	13.6	14.2	9.7	5.9	116.2
Source: NOAA

== Parish seat ==
The municipality is composed of six parishes: Juan Ignacio Montilla, la Beatriz, la Puerta, Mendoza Fria, Mercedes Diaz and San Luis.

== Media ==
The city has three daily papers, the Diario de Los Andes, Todo Primicias and the Diario El Tiempo, along with several radio stations, including Angel FM 93.7. Others include Radio Única. Valera also publishes the Magazine Cars Trujillo, its first magazine about cars.

=== Transport ===
The city has a national airport, Dr. Antonio Nicolás Briceño Airport, with a 2,000-meter runway, which connects the region with the capital Caracas.

=== Newspapers ===
- Diario de Los Andes (Daily)
- Weather Journal
- Diario El Tiempo (Daily)

=== Television ===
The city of Valera has three regional channels:

- Plus TV, UHF channel 48 and channel 7 on cable.
- Come TV, channel 8 on cable.
- TV Andes (in testing), channel 16 and 10 on cable.

Also is available Directv and Intercable with an extended grill with more than 50 international channels.

== Sports ==
Home of Trujillanos FC (Venezuelan soccer league) a first division soccer club that has its headquarters in the José Alberto Pérez Complex (formerly known as Estadio Luis Loreto Lira).

== Notable people ==
- José Antonio Abreu (1939–2018), orchestra conductor, pianist, economist, educator, activist, and politician
- Luis Matos (born 2002), baseball outfielder for the San Francisco Giants
- José Manuel Pirela (born 1989), baseball second baseman and outfielder for the Philadelphia Phillies
