= FLOAT Shuttle =

Californian start-up commuter airline

- Commenced operations: 2020
- AOC #: 141A2460
- Operating bases: Pomona
- Key people: Arnel Guiang, Tom Hsieh, Rob McKinney
- Website: Official website

FLOAT Shuttle (Fly Over All Traffic) was a Californian start-up commuter airline based in Pomona. The airline was founded by Arnel Guiang, Tom Hsieh, and Rob McKinney. The company proposed a subscription service that would allow customers to travel on daily flights between various general aviation airports in the Los Angeles area.

Flights were planned to be operated by Southern Airways Express with Cessna Grand Caravan aircraft in a 9-passenger configuration. In August 2020 FLOAT completed the purchase of the remaining assets of Ravn Alaska, which declared bankruptcy earlier in the year.

On January 26, 2026, Float Alaska, the parent company of FLOAT Shuffle, filed for Chapter 11 bankruptcy protection, listing assets between $1 million and $10 million and liabilities between $10 million and $50 million.

== Fleet ==
- Cessna Grand Caravan operated by Southern Airways Express on behalf of FLOAT Shuttle

== Destinations ==
- Camarillo
- Carlsbad
- Compton
- Corona
- El Monte
- Fullerton
- Hawthorne
- Pomona
- Torrance
- San Fernando
