= Avior Airlines =

Venezuelan airline

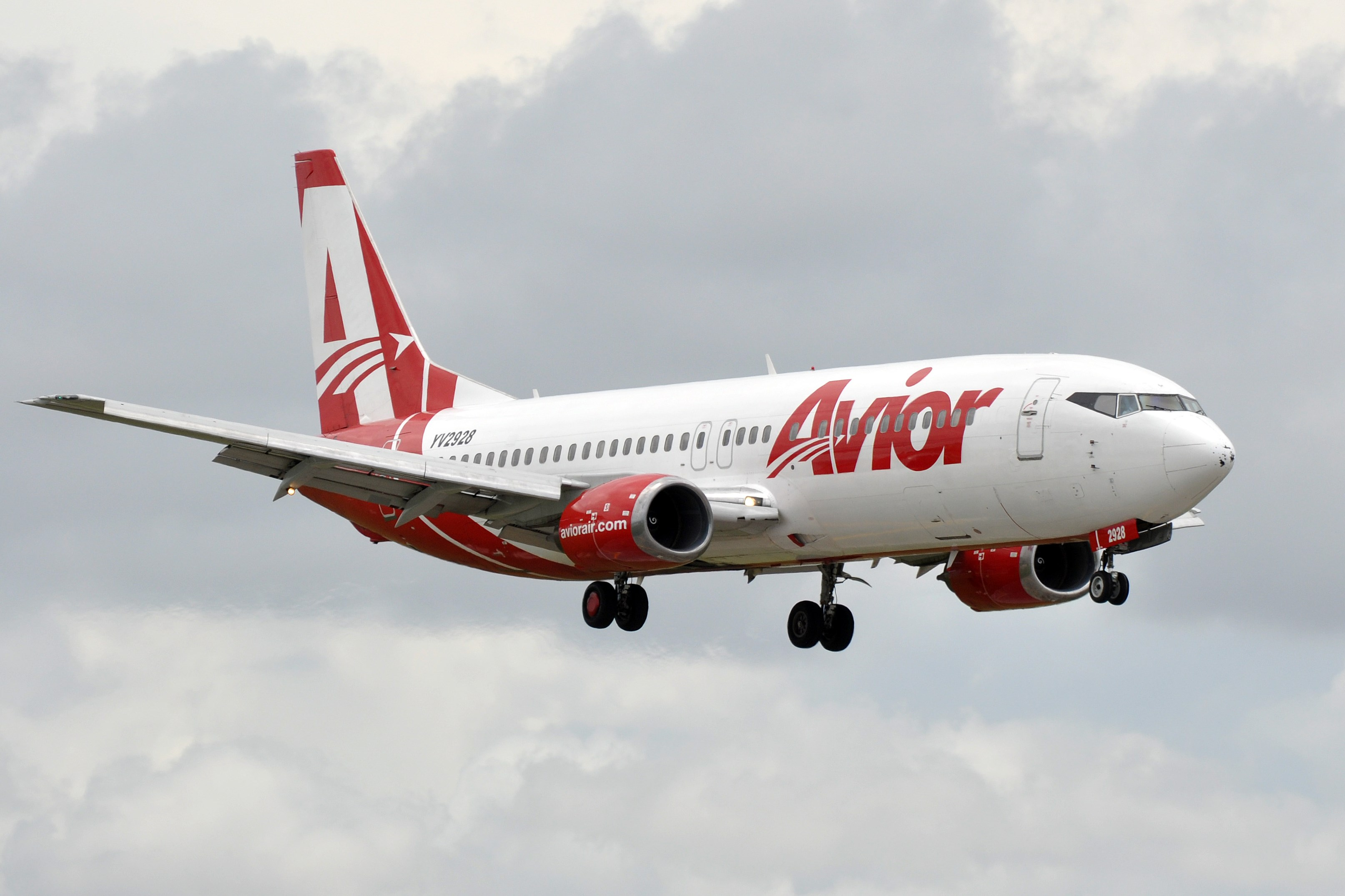
IATA	ICAO	Call sign
9V	ROI	AVIOR
- Founded: September 3, 1994
- Commenced operations: June 30, 1995
- Hubs: General José Antonio Anzoátegui International Airport
- Secondary hubs: Simón Bolívar International Airport
- Frequent-flyer program: AviorPlus
- Subsidiaries: Pariana de Aviación
- Fleet size: 10
- Destinations: 13
- Headquarters: Barcelona, Venezuela
- Key people: Jorge Añez Dager (CEO and founder); Jose Sulbaran (President)
- Employees: +1,800 (2020)
- Website: www.aviorair.com

Avior Airlines C.A. (legally Aviones de Oriente C.A.) is an airline based in Barcelona, Venezuela. It operates scheduled and charter services within Venezuela and the southern Caribbean out of its main hub at Generál José Antonio Anzoátegui International Airport. It is currently the largest private capital airline in Venezuela in terms of fleet, destinations and its more than 1,800 employees nationally and internationally.

== History ==
Founded by Jorge Luis Añez Dager and Rafael Ciarcia Walo, the airline was established as Avior Express, and started operations on June 30, 1995, initially using a single five-seat Cessna Skymaster for charter flights to Margarita Island and Canaima. It is fully owned by Jorge Añez Dager.

In 2009, Avior Airlines entered a temporary bankruptcy crisis, leading to the suspension of most of its routes as well as the sale of all of their 12 Beechcraft 1900D.

For 2012, Avior Airlines announced the creation of a new subsidiary, Avior Regional, that would cover the old routes suspended in 2009, as well as the purchase of 4 Boeing 737-400s for international flights. In 2013, the first of the 737s arrived, as did the first Fokker 50 intended for Avior Regional. Due to delays in the process of getting the new airline certified by the National Institute of Civil Aviation, the Fokker 50s were employed by the parent company until mid-2015, when they were transferred to Avior Regional's fleet.

In 2015, Avior started an ambitious process of expanding its fleet and destinations, intending to encourage Venezuelan air connectivity, as a result of the reduction of flights from foreign airlines to the country.

On December 3, 2017, Avior was added to the list of airlines banned in the European Union, due to failing to meet the EU's safety requirements.

== Destinations ==
As of November 2025, Avior Airlines flies to the following destinations:

Country	City	Airport	Notes	Refs
Colombia	Bogotá	El Dorado International Airport		
Colombia	Medellín	José María Córdova International Airport		
Curaçao	Willemstad	Curaçao International Airport		
Venezuela
Venezuela	Barcelona	General José Antonio Anzoátegui International Airport	Hub	
Venezuela	Barquisimeto	Jacinto Lara International Airport		
Venezuela	Caracas	Simón Bolívar International Airport	Hub	
Venezuela	El Vigia	Juan Pablo Pérez Alfonzo Airport		
Venezuela	Las Piedras	Josefa Camejo International Airport		
Venezuela	Maracaibo	La Chinita International Airport		
Venezuela	Puerto Ayacucho	Cacique Aramare Airport		
Venezuela	Puerto Ordaz	Manuel Carlos Piar Guayana Airport		

== Fleet ==
=== Current ===
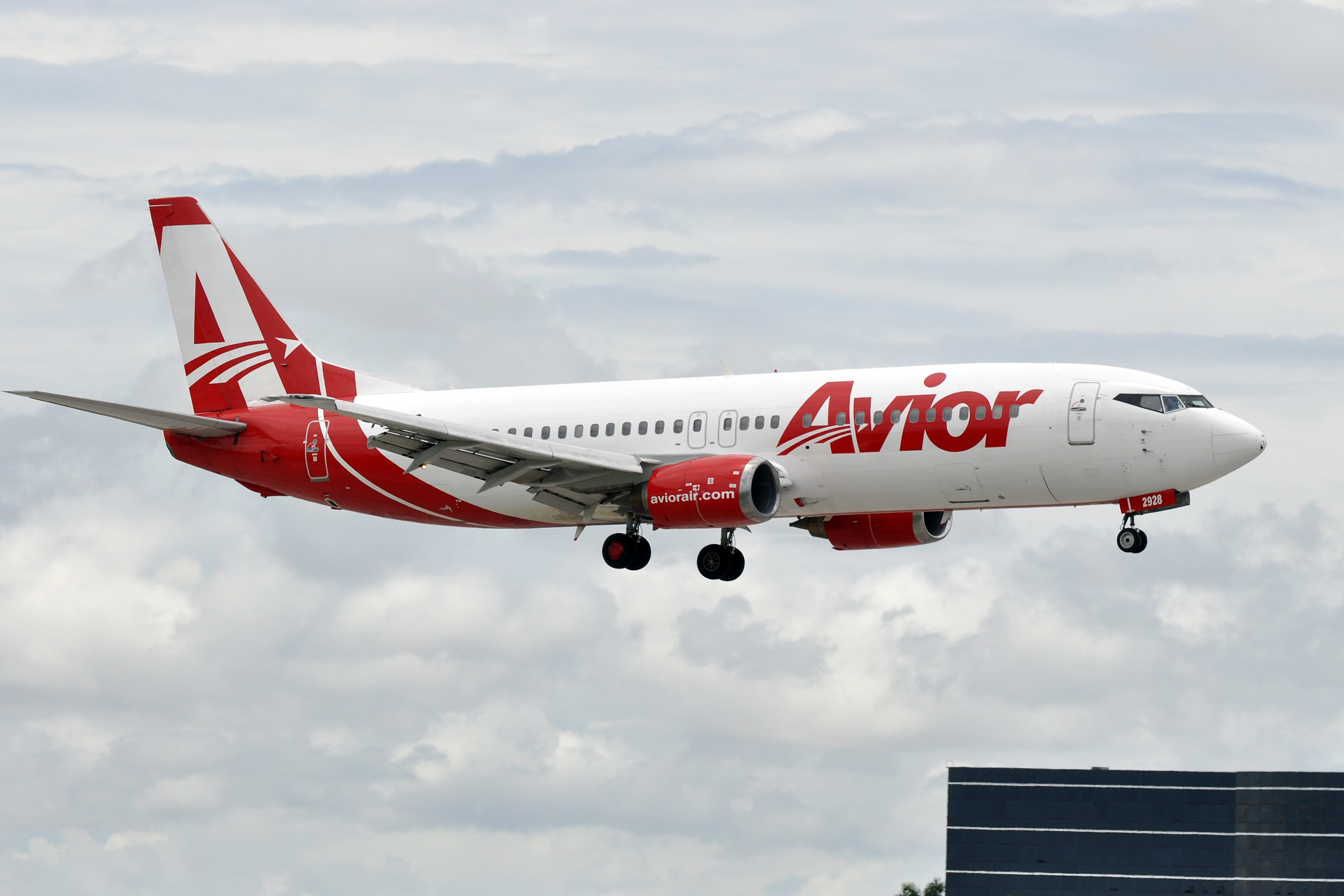
Avior Boeing 737-400, 2014

As of November 2025, the Avior Airlines fleet includes the following aircraft:

Avior Airlines fleet
Aircraft	In service	Orders	Passengers			Notes
Aircraft	In service	Orders	C	Y	Total	Notes
Boeing 737-200	2	—	12	96	108	
Boeing 737-400	8	—	12	132	144	
Boeing 737-400	8	—	12	138	150	
Total	10	—				

== Accidents and incidents ==
- On July 15, 1998, a Beechcraft 1900D was hijacked by four armed masked hijackers during a domestic flight. The hijackers were among 22 people on board the aircraft, which was flying from Caracas to Barinas. The hijackers forced the plane to divert to a remote airstrip at a cattle ranch. The hijackers released the passengers and crew and took the plane to Colombia, where it was later recovered.
- On July 30, 1999, another Beechcraft 1900D (registered YV-466C) was hijacked, this time by three men and two women. The aircraft was flying from Caracas to Guasdualito, via Barinas. Coordinates were given to the flight crew and landed the plane in Arauca, Colombia.
- On January 7, 2009, a Boeing 737-200 (registered YV1360), flying from Oranjestad to Valencia, made an emergency landing after an engine fire was reported. The aircraft diverted to Simón Bolívar International Airport where the aircraft landed safely. All 81 occupants on board were uninjured.
- On October 31, 2014, a Boeing 737-400 (registered YV2946) suffered a tire burst during takeoff at General José Antonio Anzoátegui International Airport. The flight crew aborted the takeoff and the aircraft stopped with a burst and deflated tire on the left-hand main landing gear. None of the 144 occupants on board were injured.
- On March 3, 2018, a Boeing 737-400 flying from Barcelona to Guayaquil ran off the runway during landing at José Joaquín de Olmedo International Airport. No injuries were reported, and the aircraft suffered no structural damage. The causes of this inconvenience were mainly due to the wet track and the heavy rain that fell in the city.
- On November 22, 2019, a Boeing 737-400 (registered YV3012) was servicing a flight between Valencia and Bogotá. Upon landing at El Dorado International Airport, its right main landing gear suffered a serious malfunction, causing it to collapse, which led to an evacuation once the aircraft came to a halt.
- On December 6, 2019, a Boeing 737-400 (registered YV3011) took off at 8AM flying from Lima to Caracas when it suffered a depressurization 45 minutes after takeoff. There were 133 passengers and 8 crew members on board. Some passengers suffered a lack of oxygen, including a six-month-old child. The aircraft had to make a sharp descent landing emergency in the city of Tarapoto, Peru. The airline enabled an aircraft to comply with the scheduled itinerary.

== See also ==
- List of airlines of Venezuela
- List of airlines banned in the European Union
