= Ravn Alaska =

Regional airline in Alaska, 1948–2025

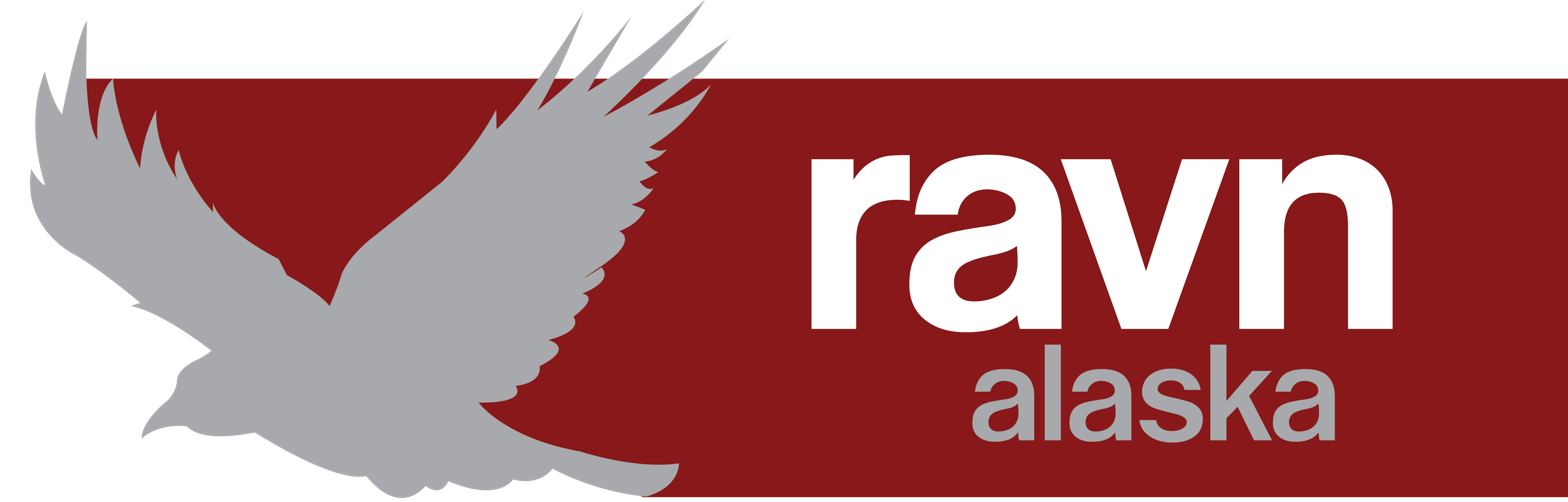

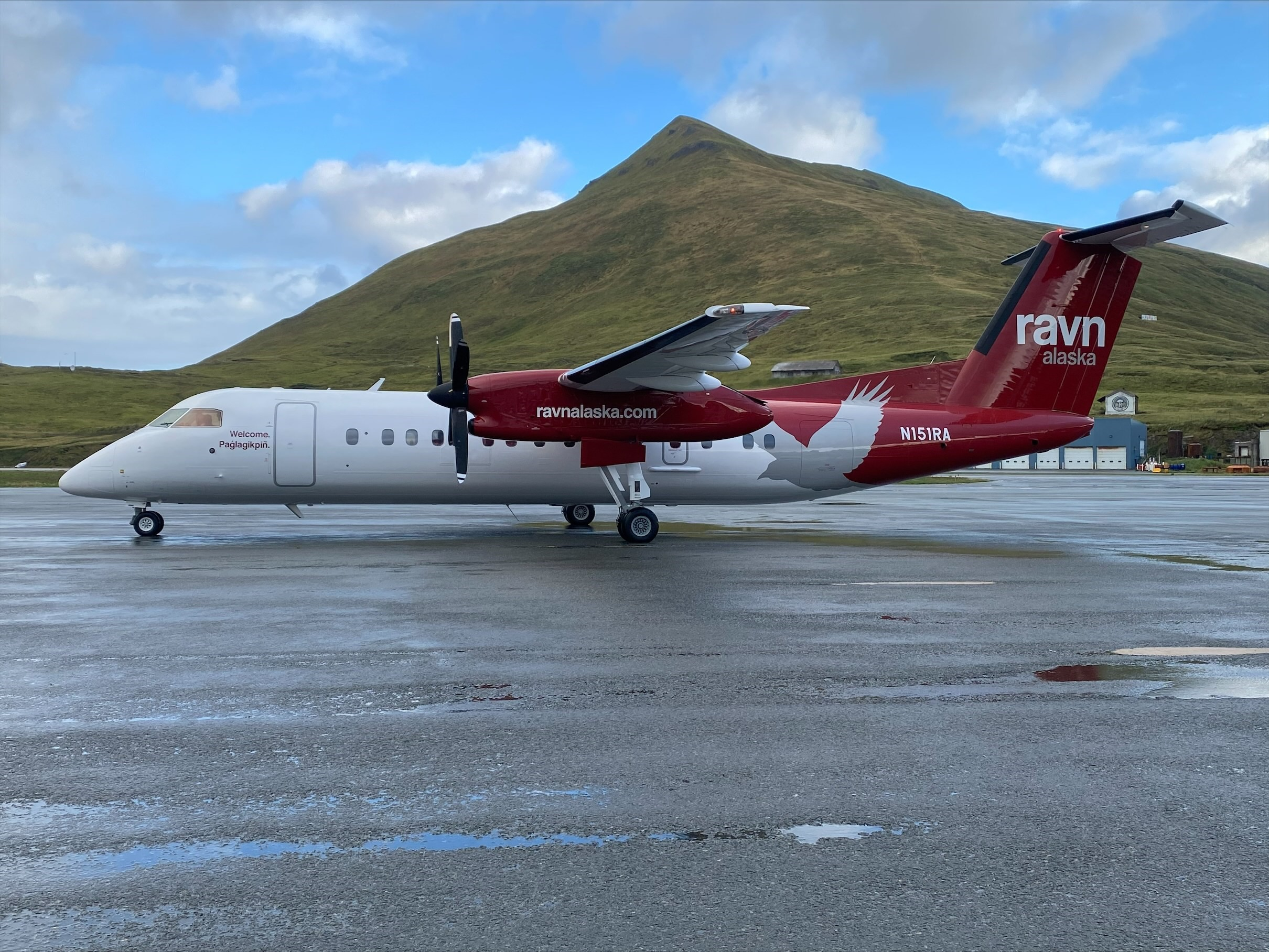
- De Havilland DHC 8 in Dutch Harbor airport
IATA	ICAO	Call sign
7H	RVF	RAVN FLIGHT
- Founded: June 20, 1948; 78 years ago (as Economy Helicopters)
- Ceased operations: August 5, 2025; 13 months ago
- AOC #: 7C7A855N
- Hubs: Anchorage
- Fleet size: 16
- Parent company: FLOAT Alaska LLC
- Headquarters: Anchorage, Alaska, United States
- Key people: Rob McKinney (CEO); Tom Hsieh (President): (CFO)
- Employees: 270+
- Website: ravnalaska.com

New Pacific Airlines, Inc., d.b.a. Ravn Alaska, was an Alaskan airline that specialized in serving small communities in the US state of Alaska. The airline was headquartered in Anchorage, which was also home to its primary hub, Ted Stevens Anchorage International Airport. They mostly operated bush planes under Part 135 FAA Regulations.

At its peak, Ravn Alaska served 12 communities in Alaska. New Pacific operated all of its flights using the Ravn Alaska brand. The company pronounced its name Ravn like the bird, Raven.

== History ==
Northern Pacific traces its roots to June 20, 1948, and the founding of Economy Helicopters. The company was founded by Carl Brady; he flew the first commercial helicopter to Alaska to work on a mapping contract for the U.S. government. In the years that followed, Economy Helicopters renamed itself Era Helicopters (now a part of Bristow Group).

In 1967, Houston based Rowan Companies, purchased the company from the founder.

Most of its business was supporting offshore oil drilling. Era's helicopters also supported the efforts to build the Alyeska Pipeline. During construction of the pipeline, the company started its fixed-wing division, based on DeHaviland Twin Otter and Convair 580 aircraft. After the construction of the pipeline, Era saw an opportunity to expand to scheduled passenger service, which they introduced in May 1983. The Convair planes were used for service to Valdez, Kenai, Kodiak, Cordova, and Homer. The Twin Otter fleet was based out of Bethel and operated service to many of the small communities surrounding it.

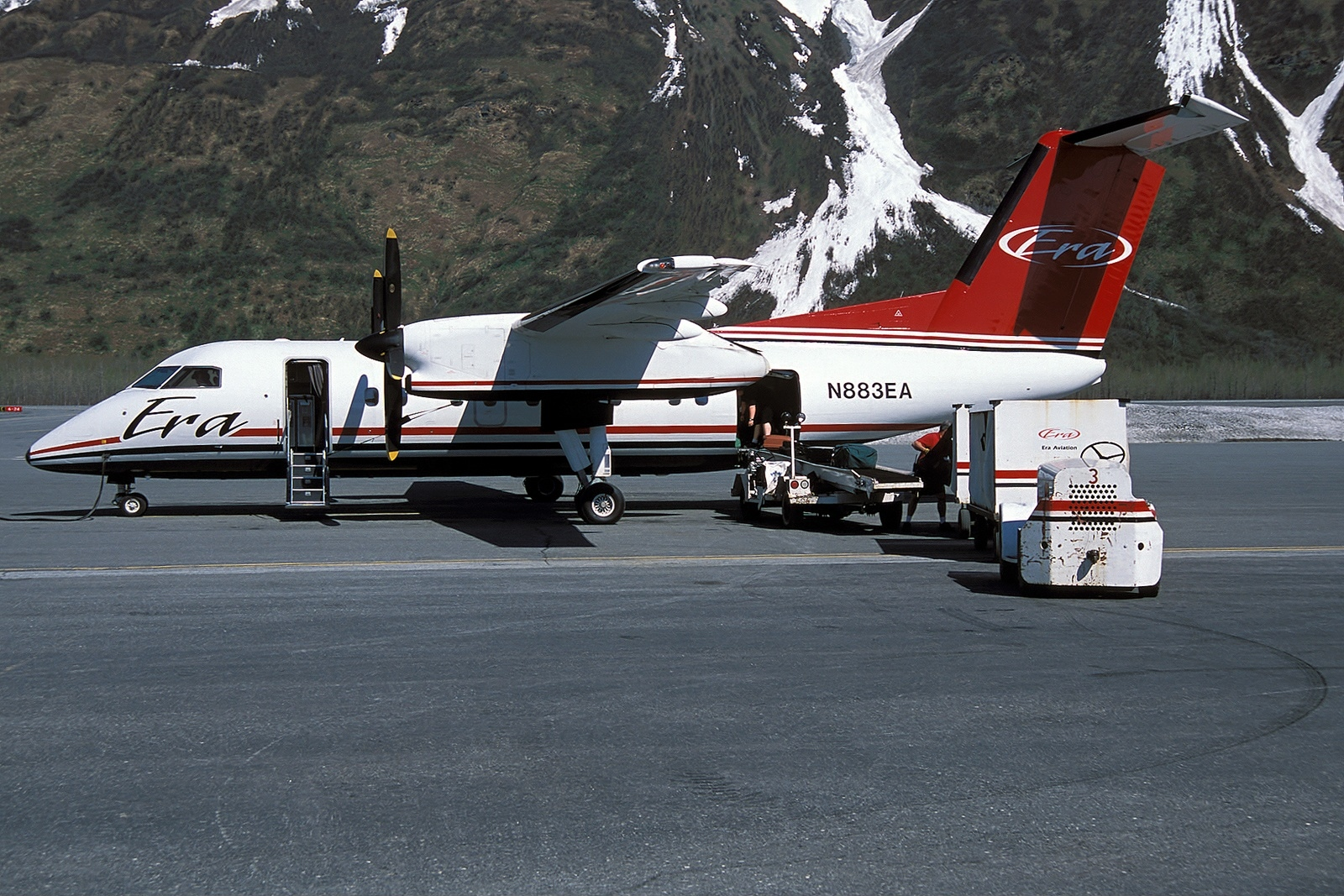
De Havilland Canada DHC 8-106

In 1988, Era Helicopters formally changed its name to Era Aviation, and changed structure and creating a division, still known as Era Helicopters, now a part of Bristow Group, alongside Era Aviation.

The company endured a very turbulent transition between December 2004 and December 2006, which saw two changes in ownership, the spinoff of the Era Helicopters division (on July 1, 2004), and the company entering (in very late 2005) and emerging from Chapter 11 Bankruptcy.

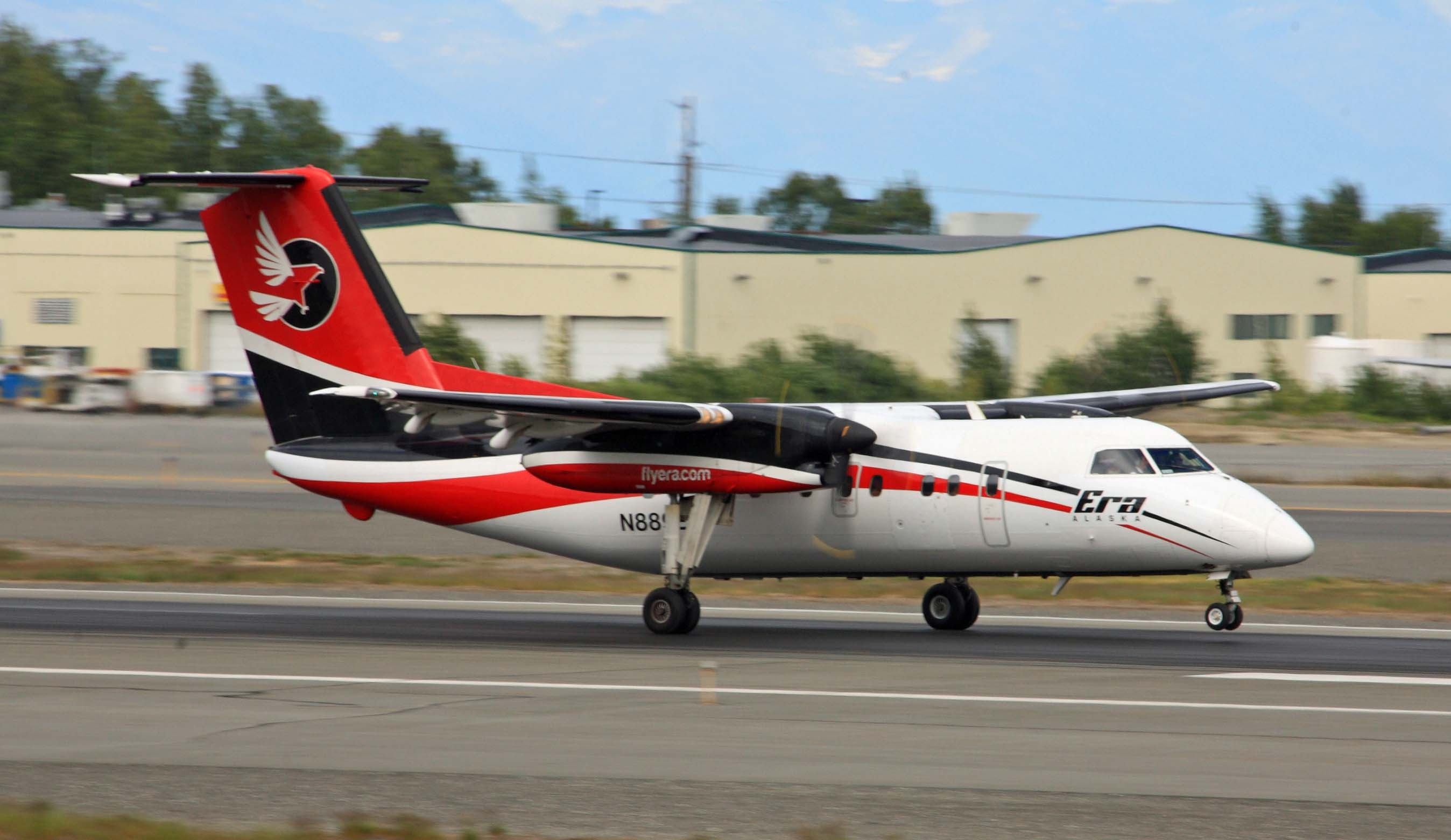
De Havilland Canada DHC 8

In early 2009, HoTH Inc., the holding company that owned Hageland Aviation Services and Frontier Flying Service, purchased Era Aviation. However, Era Helicopters was not part of the acquisition (having left common ownership on July 1, 2004, when both were under SEACOR ownership). In October 2009, HoTH Inc. also acquired Arctic Circle Air Service, a local cargo airline. The combined air group rebranded itself as Era Alaska, taking advantage of Era's recognizable name.

In January 2014, the companies were renamed once again in what the company says was an effort to decrease confusion and distinguish it from other companies that are named Era, including the former division and original operation of predecessor Era Aviation, then known as Era Helicopters/Era Group, which at this time was a publicly trading independent company. The combined air group Era Alaska was renamed Ravn Alaska, Era Airlines was renamed Corvus Airlines, and while Hageland Aviation Services and Frontier Flying Service would keep their names, they both began operating as Ravn Connect.

In August 2016, the New York-based J.F. Lehman and Co. acquired a majority stake in Ravn. The remaining shares were retained by Bob Hajdukovich, then CEO of the company.

Ravn Alaska purchased all of the aircraft and other owned assets of Yute Air on March 5, 2017, as the latter shutdown, and took over the Yute Air routes.

In January 2018, Ravn Alaska received approval from the Federal Aviation Administration to put in place a safety management system similar to those implemented by larger airlines across the USA.

=== Pandemic shutdown and Chapter 11 bankruptcy ===
On April 5, 2020, in the midst of travel disruptions due to the COVID-19 pandemic, Ravn shut down its entire operation, laid off all staff, and filed for Chapter 11 bankruptcy.

The leadership of the North Slope Borough attempted to take possession of the airline's assets in order to maintain flights and shipments to their rural communities, but the Alaska Attorney General said that they did not have authority for this action. The sudden stoppage of all operations stranded dozens of communities in rural Alaska, leaving them without regularly scheduled air service. Wright Air Service and other small air carriers have been performing air service on a charter flight basis.

At the bankruptcy auction in July 2020, the Ravn Connect part 135 airline was sold in pieces to other airlines of Alaska. The part 121 airlines Corvus Airlines and PenAir were sold to FLOAT Shuttle, a commuter service based in Los Angeles.

=== Resumption of operations ===
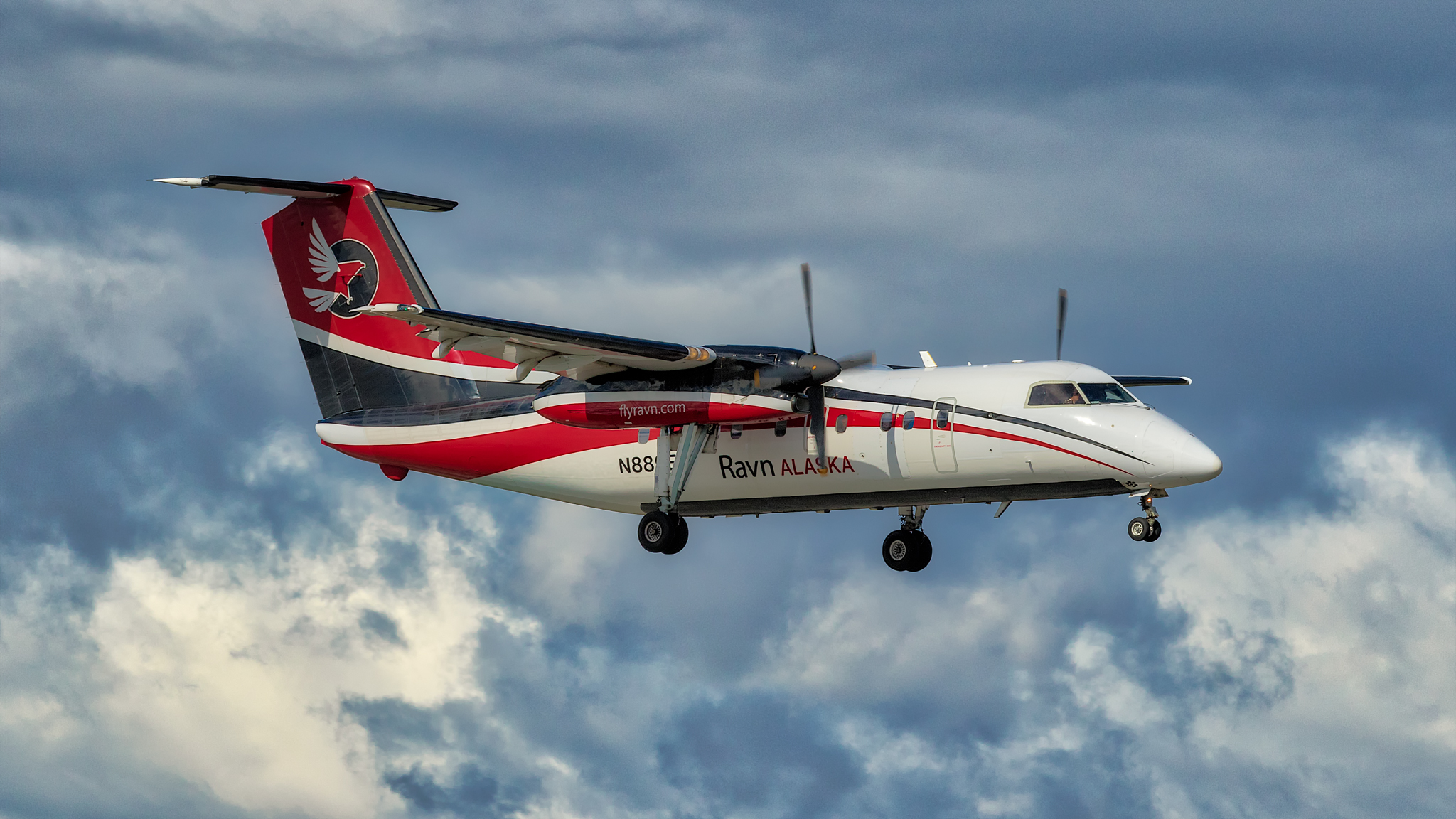
De Havilland Canada DHC 8

On October 14, 2020, Ravn Alaska received approvals from the FAA to resume operations. On November 13, 2020, while awaiting approval from the US Department of Transportation authority for scheduled operations, the airline resumed service to Dutch Harbor (Unalaska), Homer, Kenai, Sand Point, and Valdez using Public Charters managed by "Ravn Travel." Each market was served 4 days a week from Anchorage. On November 30, scheduled route authority was received from the US Department of Transportation, and the airline resumed scheduled flights to and from Anchorage, Dutch Harbor (Unalaska), Homer, Kenai, Kodiak, and Sand Point under the name Ravn Alaska.

In 2021, Ravn Alaska's parent company announced plans to launch Northern Pacific Airways, a new low-cost airline that would fly passengers between North America and Asia via a stopover at Ted Stevens Anchorage International Airport. The new airline is planned to commence operations in 2023 using Boeing 757 aircraft. In 2021, Corvus Airlines was renamed to Northern Pacific Airways.

On February 23, 2024, CEO Rob McKinney announced that 130 employees had been laid off amid increasing financial difficulties. He cited inflation, labor shortages and unexpected competition on some of Ravn’s routes.

After progressively drawing down its remaining routes and destinations, the airline operated its last flight from Valdez to Anchorage on August 5, 2025. On January 26, 2026, Float Alaska, the parent company of Ravn Alaska, filed for Chapter 11 bankruptcy protection, listing assets between $1 million and $10 million and liabilities between $10 million and $50 million.

== Fleet ==
The Ravn Alaska fleet included the following aircraft before it ceased operations:

Ravn Alaska fleet
Aircraft	Number	Seats	Notes
de Havilland DHC-8-100	7	29–37	9 Corvus Airlines
de Havilland DHC-8-300	1	50	Delivered July 3, 2021
Boeing 757-200	4	189	(New Pacific Airlines)
Total	12		

=== Formerly operated ===
- Beechcraft 1900
- Cessna Caravan 208B
- Cessna 207
- Piper Navajo
- Convair 580
- de Havilland Canada DHC-6 Twin Otter Series 300
- de Havilland Canada DHC-7 Dash 7

== Destinations ==
Previously, Ravn Alaska offered scheduled service to over 100 Alaskan cities and communities. In early 2025, Ravn Alaska served 6 communities and provided statewide charter service.

== Media appearances ==
Beginning on January 14, 2011, Discovery Channel's Flying Wild Alaska showcased Era Alaska's daily operations. It aired until July 20, 2012, totaling 31 episodes over three seasons.

== Accidents and incidents ==
None of the accidents below were by the air carrier certificate Northern Pacific Airways f/k/a Corvus Airlines. These were all by other certificates owned by the Ravn Air Group that was dissolved in bankruptcy in 2020.

- November 8, 1997 – Hageland Aviation Flight 500 was a Cessna Caravan 675B which crashed. After the NTSB report, investigators determined there were multiple causes of the crash, including icing, weight imbalance and pilot error. The accident killed all 8 passengers and crew on board.
- December 9, 2002 – During a Raytheon Pre-purchase Flight, a Beechcraft 1900C crashed after running into a mountain in western Arkansas. The accident killed all 3 pilots on board, including Ron Tweto, President of Hageland Aviation Services.
- November 29, 2013 – Four people were killed when Flight 1453 crashed near the village of St. Mary's. The flight originated from Bethel.
- August 31, 2016 – A Ravn Connect Cessna 208B Grand Caravan EX collided with a Renfro's Alaskan Adventures Piper Super Cub during a flight from Russian Mission Airport to Marshall Airport in Alaska. The five people on board the two aircraft lost their lives.
- October 2, 2016 – Three people were killed when a Ravn Alaska Cessna 208B crashed near Togiak, Alaska. There were no survivors.

== See also ==
- Buffalo Airways - Another airline with a reality TV show based around it
