= SBA Airlines =

1997–2018 Venezuelan airline

IATA	ICAO	Call sign
S3	BBR	SANTA BARBARA
- Founded: 1 November 1995
- Commenced operations: 1 March 1997
- Ceased operations: 26 April 2018
- Hubs: Simón Bolívar International Airport
- Frequent-flyer program: Privilege
- Alliance: Aserca Airlines
- Fleet size: 5
- Destinations: 3
- Parent company: Grupo Cóndor C.A.
- Headquarters: Caracas, Distrito Capital, Venezuela
- Key people: Francisco González (President)
- Website: sbairlines.com (archived)

Santa Bárbara Airlines, also branded as SBA Airlines, was an airline with its headquarters on the third floor of the Edificio Tokay in Caracas, Venezuela. It operated scheduled domestic and international services. Its main base was Simón Bolívar International Airport, Maiquetía (Caracas).

== History ==
Former logo from 2005.

The airline was established on 1 November 1995 and started operations on 1 March 1997. At March 2000, the airline had 80 employees and a fleet of three ATR 42-300s to serve both a domestic and a regional network that consisted of Aruba, Barquisimeto, Barranquilla, Caracas, Coro, Curaçao, Las Piedras, Maracaibo, Mérida, Santa Barbara Zulia and Valencia. It wholly owned Islas Airways until September 2006, when Islas was sold to the Canary Islands company Grupo SOAC. Santa Bárbara Airlines was rechristened as SBA Airlines in 2008, following the acquisition of the carrier by Aserca Airlines.

At first it only covered airline flights to Cabimas, Mérida, El Vigía and Santa Bárbara del Zulia. The route to Alberto Carnevali Airport in Mérida was diverted to El Vigía-Juan Pablo Pérez Alfonzo International Airport after the crash of Flight 518. Later, the airline took new destinations which covered the routes to Barquisimeto, Caracas, Cumaná, Las Piedras (Punto Fijo), San Antonio del Táchira and Valencia with a single overseas flight that covered the route Caracas – Oranjestad (Aruba).

In early 2009, a 245-seater Boeing 767-300ER was introduced into the fleet to replace a wet-leased aircraft of the same type, and Funchal and Madrid were incorporated into the international network (which already included Miami, Quito and Tenerife) in June the same year.

Later, the airline opened international routes from Caracas to Barranquilla, Quito, Lima, Lisbon, London, Madrid, Miami, New York, Santiago de Compostela, Orlando, Tenerife and Paris. The routes to New York City and Lima in the Americas, and Funchal, Lisbon, Madrid, Tenerife and Santiago de Compostela in Europe meanwhile ceased.

In late January 2018, the National Institute of Civil Aviation suspended SBA Airlines for 90 days citing the airline's impossibility to fulfil the schedules, amid the cancellation of some flights that left stranded passengers in Miami. At this time, the Caracas–Miami route was the only service the airline had available to book at its website. SBA Airlines ceased operations on April 26, 2018, after it returned its air operator's certificate.

== Destinations ==
SBA Airlines served the following scheduled destinations as of January 2018. After all flights were suspended by government authorities on 26 January 2018,

Country	City	Airport	Notes	Refs
Aruba	Oranjestad	Queen Beatrix International Airport		
Curaçao	Willemstad	Hato International Airport		
Ecuador	Quito	Mariscal Sucre International Airport		
Ecuador	Guayaquil	José Joaquín de Olmedo International Airport		
Panama	Panama City	Tocumen International Airport	Terminated	
Portugal	Madeira	Funchal Airport		
Spain	Madrid	Madrid-Barajas Airport	Terminated	
Spain	Santiago de Compostela	Santiago de Compostela Airport	Seasonal	
Spain	Tenerife	Los Rodeos Airport	Terminated	
United States	Miami	Miami International Airport		
Venezuela	Caracas	Simón Bolívar International Airport	Hub	
Venezuela	El Vigia	Juan Pablo Pérez Alfonso Airport		
Venezuela	Maracaibo	La Chinita International Airport		
Venezuela	Punto Fijo	Josefa Camejo International Airport		
Venezuela	Valencia	Arturo Michelena International Airport		

== Fleet ==
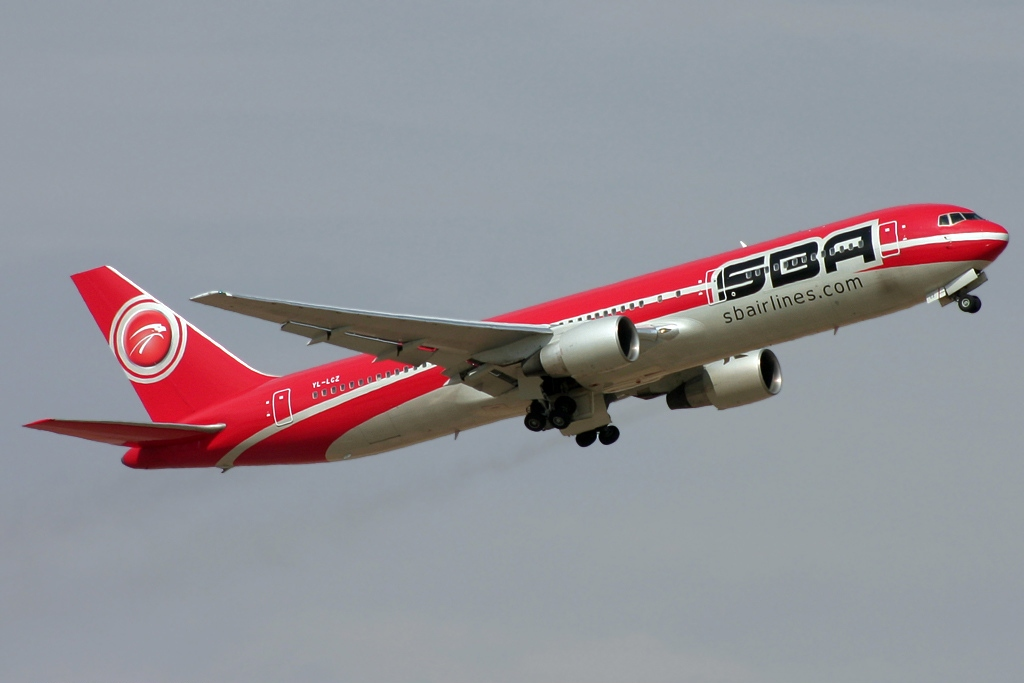
A Boeing 767-300ER in SBA Airlines livery departing Madrid–Barajas Airport in 2009.

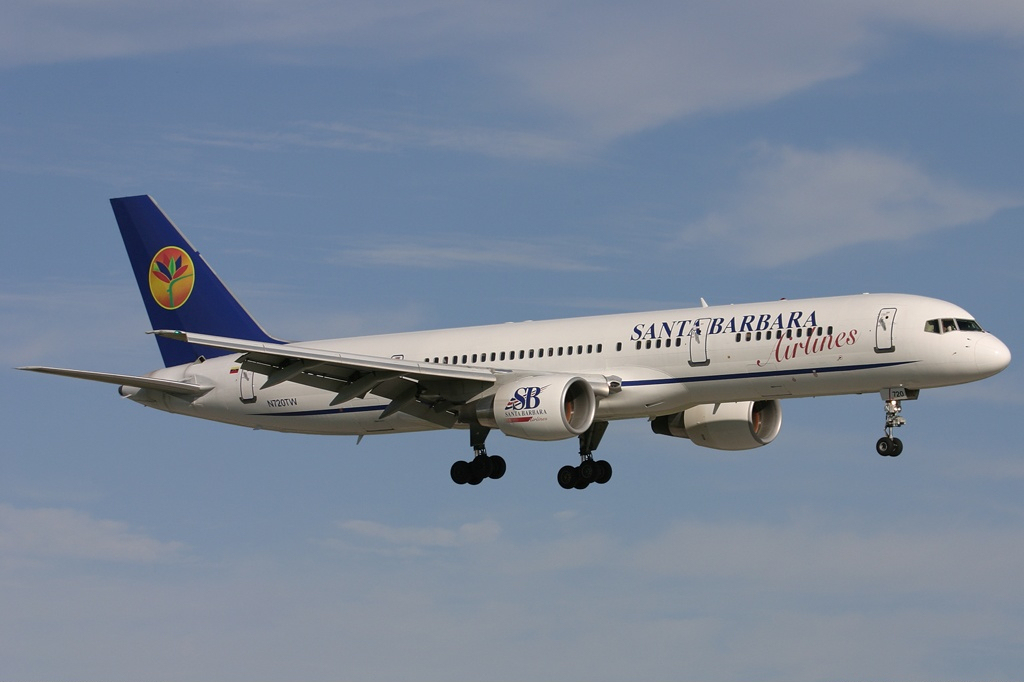
A Boeing 757-200 in the Santa Bárbara Airlines livery landing at Miami International Airport in 2004.

=== Final fleet ===
As of May 2017, the SBA Airlines fleet consisted of the following aircraft:

SBA Airlines Fleet
Aircraft	Total	Orders	Passengers			Notes
Aircraft	Total	Orders	J	Y	Total	Notes
Boeing 757-200	2	—	24	154	178	
Boeing 767-300ER	3	—	18	224	242	
Total	5	—				

=== Previous fleet ===
Over the years, SBA Airlines had operated the following aircraft types:

SBA Airlines previous fleet
Aircraft	Introduced	Retired	Notes
Airbus A330-200	2015	2015	Leased from Hi Fly
ATR 42-300	2005	2008	
ATR 42-320	1997	2006	
Boeing 727-200	2003	2008	
McDonnell Douglas DC-9-31	Unknown	Unknown	
McDonnell Douglas DC-10-30	2002	2005	
McDonnell Douglas MD-82	2009	2018	Leased from Aserca Airlines
McDonnell Douglas MD-83	2009	2018	Leased from Aserca Airlines

== Accidents and incidents ==
On 21 February 2008, an ATR 42-300 turboprop airliner operating Flight 518 from Mérida to Caracas, went missing shortly after taking off. Forty-three passengers and a crew of three, including two pilots and one flight attendant, were reportedly on board at the time. The remains of the aircraft were found the following day in a mountain range approximately 10 kilometers north-east of Mérida at an altitude of 12,000 feet (3,700 m). No survivors were found. After the accident, the company started a new public relations program as well as a new marketing initiative, switching the airline's name to SBA Airlines.

== See also ==
- PAWA Dominicana
