= Aserca Airlines =

Venezuelan airline (1968–2018)

Aserca Airlines C.A

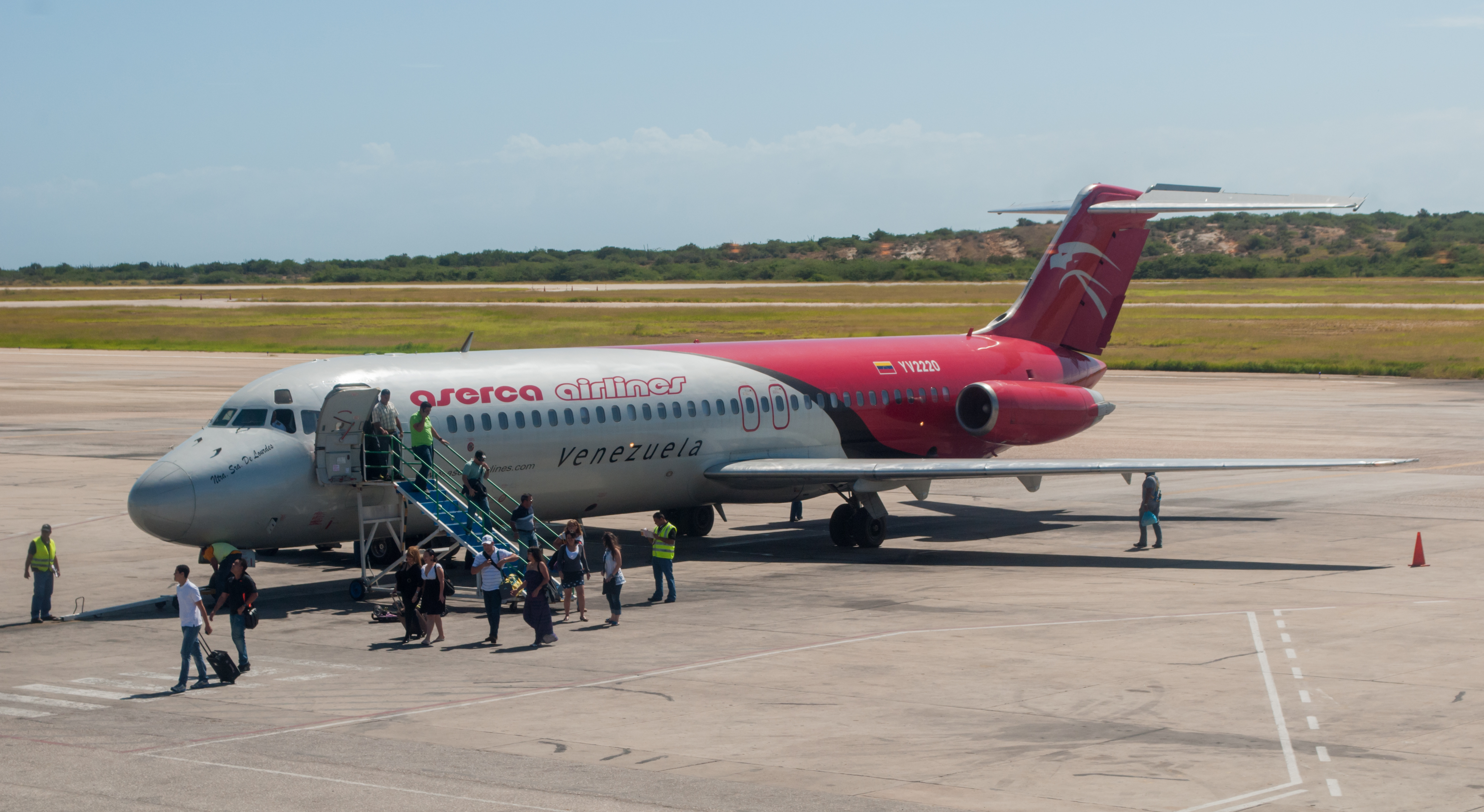
IATA	ICAO	Call sign
R7	OCA	ASERCA
- Founded: March 6, 1968
- Commenced operations: September 14, 1992
- Ceased operations: May 22, 2018
- Hubs: Simón Bolívar International Airport
- Frequent-flyer program: Privilege
- Alliance: SBA Airlines
- Fleet size: 5
- Destinations: 12
- Parent company: Grupo Cóndor C.A.
- Headquarters: Arturo Michelena International Airport, Valencia, Venezuela
- Key people: Simeon Garcia (CEO); Migdalia Garcia
- Website: www.asercaairlines.com

Aserca Airlines C.A. (legally Aero Servicios Carabobo C.A.) was an airline based in Valencia, Venezuela. It operated domestic and regional scheduled services to destinations in the Caribbean and Central America. Its main hub was at Arturo Michelena International Airport.

== History ==
Old logo of the airline until 2007.

The airline was established on March 6, 1968, as a private air transport company. Subsequently, on July 27, 1990, the Valencian businessman Simeón García acquired all the shares and decided to direct it to passenger air transport. The airline started commercial operations on September 14, 1992, in the domestic scheduled market with a couple of leased Douglas DC-9-30s. Aserca's operations were centered on Valencia, but it managed to develop Caracas as a hub after 1994 which, combined with the demise of flag carrier Viasa in January 1997, made Aserca experience significant growth in its market share, expanding its network to Bogotá, Lima and Miami, via Aruba. Between October 1998 and 2000, Aserca had a controlling interest in Air Aruba, forming an alliance between both airlines.

In September 2008, the airline created a commercial alliance with SBA Airlines, also from Venezuela with whom it undertook international expansion through, unifying the corporate image of both airlines and coordinating their respective itineraries to improve their connection times between the flights of both airlines, to facilitate connections between the national destinations of Aserca with international destinations of SBA. The alliance, named Grupo Cóndor C.A., also collaborated with the Dominican airline PAWA Dominicana.

In June 2013, Venezuela's National Institute of Civil Aviation (INAC) announced that it would prohibit operations of classic aircraft types like the Douglas DC-9, Boeing 727, and Boeing 737-200 in Venezuela from November 1, 2013. Aserca Airlines obtain a special dispensation from INAC, allowing the airline to operate its remaining two DC-9s until July 28, 2014, when it chose to replace them with the McDonnell Douglas MD-80.

On February 21, 2018, it was announced that INAC had withdrawn the airline's operating license until further notice. The country's newspapers attribute the lack of proof of insurance for the aircraft in the fleet to this. The airline planned to restart operations, but on May 22, 2018, Aserca announced it had ceased all operations due to financial bankruptcy after returning its air operator's certificate (AOC).

In June 2026, Simeon Garcia, ex-CEO of Aserca Airlines, announced that the company is coming back, confirming that they will be using new Airbus A320 family of aircraft, replacing the old MD-80 Fleet Aserca used, along with a new livery. Earlier in February 2026, it was confirmed by him that they are getting a new AOC from INAC, and a new IATA and ICAO codes (as the old R7-OCA code has been out for over 8 years).

== Destinations ==
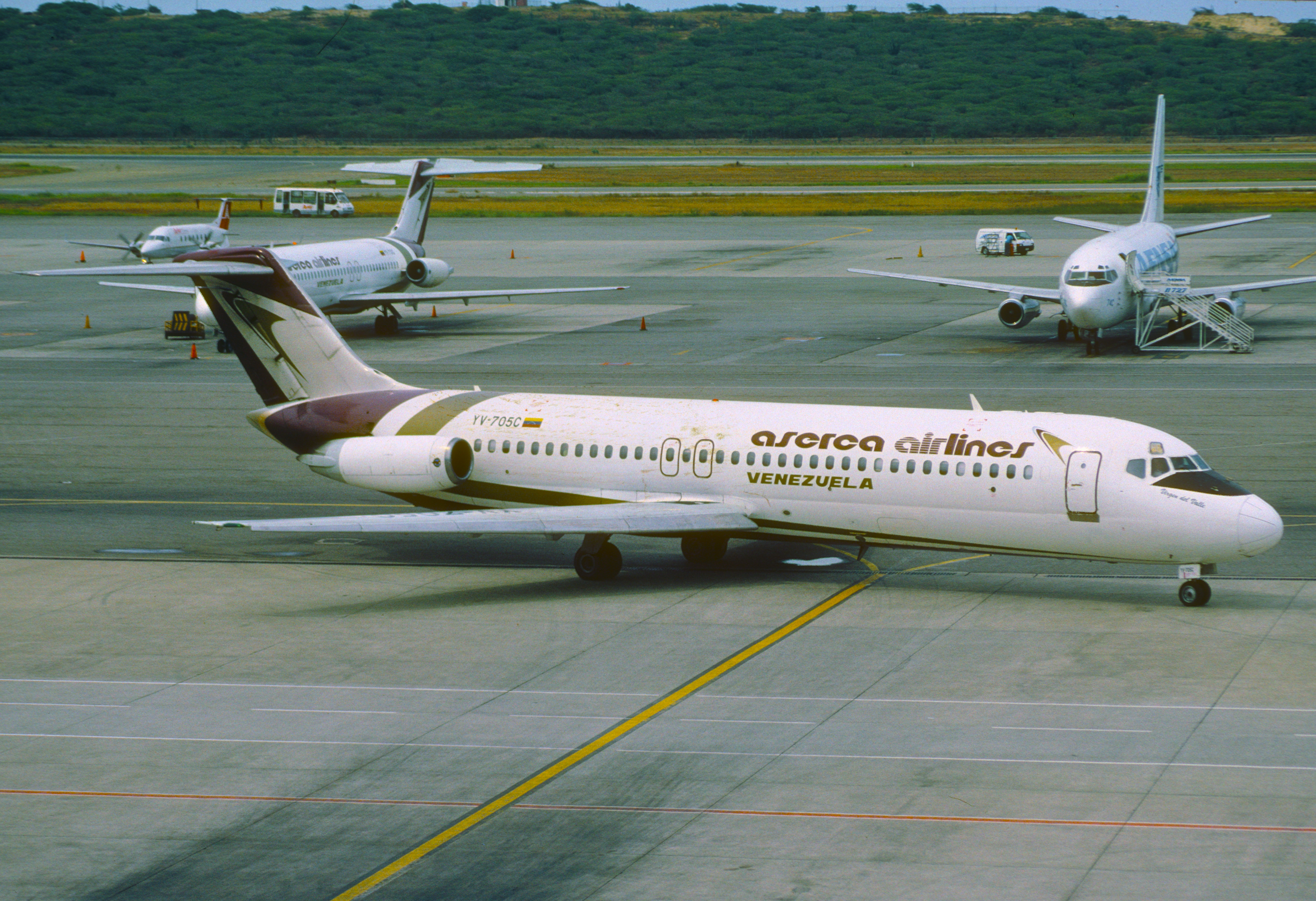
Aserca Airlines McDonnell Douglas DC-9-31 in its former scheme.

Aserca Airlines served the following destinations at the time of its demise:

Country	City	Airport	Notes	Refs
Aruba	Oranjestad	Queen Beatrix International Airport		
Curaçao	Willemstad	Curaçao International Airport		
Dominican Republic	Santo Domingo	Las Américas International Airport		
Venezuela	Barcelona	General José Antonio Anzoátegui International Airport		
Venezuela	Barquisimeto	Jacinto Lara International Airport		
Venezuela	Caracas	Simón Bolívar International Airport	Hub	
Venezuela	El Vigía	Juan Pablo Pérez Alfonzo Airport	Suspended	
Venezuela	Las Piedras	Josefa Camejo International Airport		
Venezuela	Maracaibo	La Chinita International Airport		
Venezuela	Maturín	José Tadeo Monagas International Airport		
Venezuela	Puerto Ordaz	Manuel Carlos Piar Guayana Airport		
Venezuela	Valencia	Arturo Michelena International Airport		

=== Codeshare agreements ===
Aserca Airlines additionally had codeshare agreements with:

- PAWA Dominicana (on routes to Antigua, Havana, Miami, Port-au-Prince, San Juan and St. Maarten)
- SBA Airlines

== Fleet ==
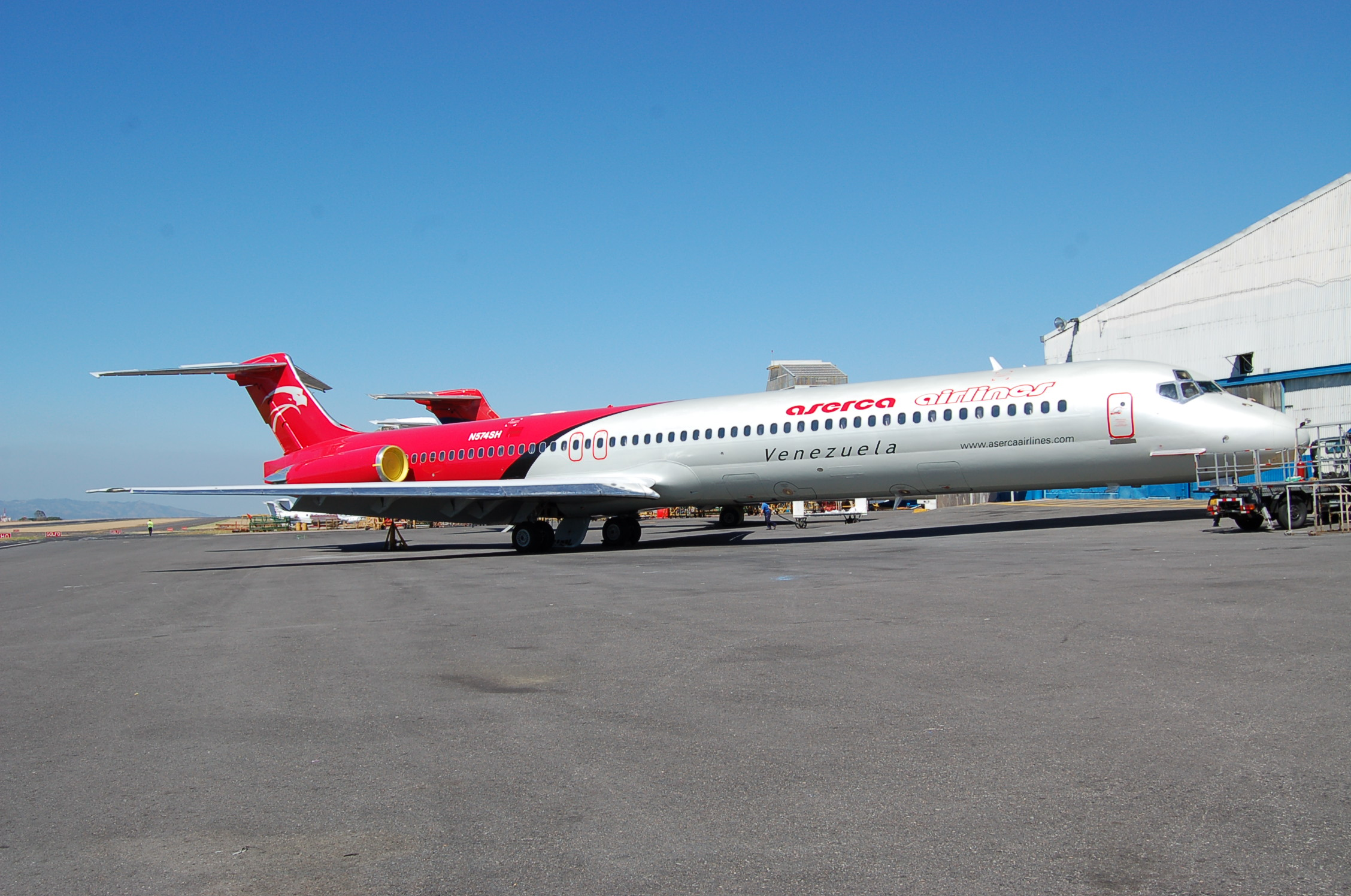
Aserca Airlines McDonnell Douglas MD-82 prior to delivery with the airline.

Over the years, Aserca Airlines has operated the following aircraft types:

Aserca Airlines fleet
Aircraft	Total	Introduced	Retired	Notes
Boeing 737-200	5	2001	2004	Leased from TACA Airlines.
McDonnell Douglas DC-9-10	1	2002	2003	
McDonnell Douglas DC-9-30	30	1992	2014	
McDonnell Douglas MD-82	5	2009	2017	
McDonnell Douglas MD-83	6	2010	2018	Two leased to SBA Airlines.
McDonnell Douglas MD-90-30	1	1998	2000	Leased from Air Aruba.

== Accidents and incidents ==
- On February 12, 2008, a Douglas DC-9-31 (registered YV298T) crashed on one of the runways of the Simón Bolívar International Airport. The aircraft left the hangar with its engines running and could not brake or turn. It crossed runway 09 when it fell into a channel in the area before reaching runway 10L.
- On March 6, 2012, a McDonnell Douglas MD-82 (registered YV348T) struck five cows that were on the runway during landing at Mayor Buenaventura Vivas Airport, generating minor damage to the jet on the left main gear and left-hand flaps. All 125 passengers and 6 crew were uninjured, and the aircraft was repaired.
- On August 24, 2012, a McDonnell Douglas MD-82 (registered YV493T) ran off the runway on landing at Mayor Buenaventura Vivas Airport during heavy storms, sustaining minor damage. No injuries were reported. The aircraft, however, was withdrawn from service.

== See also ==
- List of airlines of Venezuela
- PAWA Dominicana
- SBA Airlines
