= Aruba Airlines =

Flag carrier of Aruba

Aruba Airlines N.V.

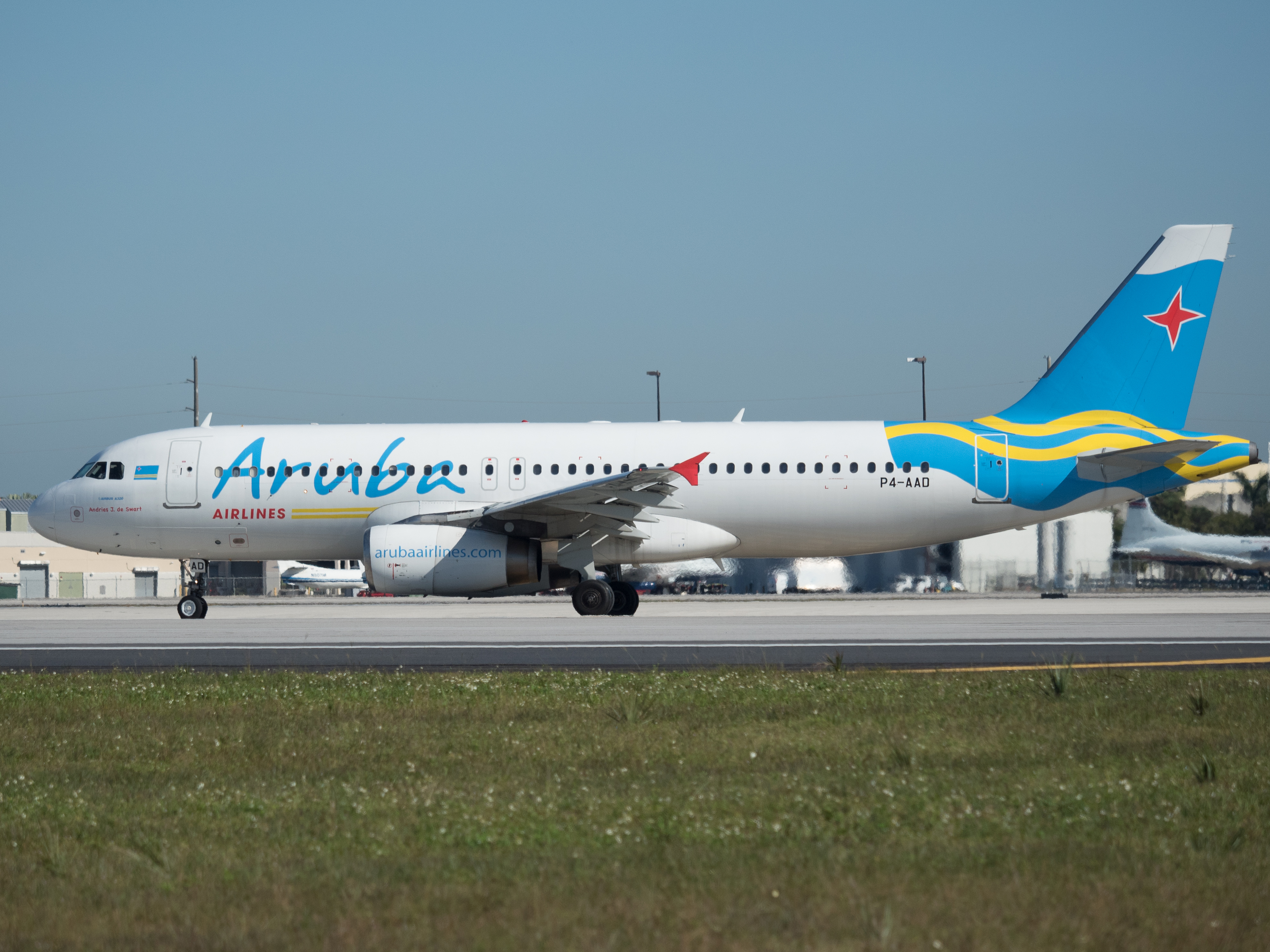
IATA	ICAO	Call sign
AG	ARU	ARUBA
- Founded: 2006
- Commenced operations: 31 March 2013
- Hubs: Queen Beatrix International Airport
- Frequent-flyer program: DiviMiles
- Fleet size: 1
- Destinations: 3
- Parent company: Seastar Holding N.V
- Headquarters: Oranjestad, Aruba
- Key people: Esteban Valles (CEO); Francisco Arendsz (CFO)
- Founder: Onno J. de Swart
- Website: www.arubaairlines.com

Aruba Airlines (legally Arubaanse Luchtvaart Maatschappij N.V.) is the flag carrier and the sole airline of Aruba. The airline was founded in 2006, providing scheduled and charter air transport for passengers to 13 destinations. Aruba Airlines's corporate headquarters is in Oranjestad, Aruba. The airline operates its primary maintenance base in Miami. They received an AOC from the United States in 2015.

== History ==
Aruba Airlines was established by Onno J. de Swart in 2006. It began charter operations with a seven-seat Piper PA-31 Navajo in 2010. The main headquarters is in the city of Oranjestad in Aruba, which is the main operation center, and the airline opened a new office at Queen Beatrix International Airport. It also has smaller offices in Miami, Curaçao, Bonaire, Maracaibo, Valencia and Maracay.

In early 2012 the company attracted new investors, leading to the upgrade of operations to jet aircraft. The company received an economic air operator's certificate in August 2012. The airline then arranged to lease two Airbus A320 twin-engined 150-seat jet airliners; the first one arrived in Aruba in November 2012. The aircraft started to fly charter flights from Aruba at the end of 2012 and scheduled operations started on 31 March 2013, with Maracaibo, Venezuela as its initial destination. Flights to Panama City, Panama began on 5 July of that year.

Aruba Airlines also started flying between Aruba to Curaçao and Santo Domingo in December 2015, operating with the Airbus A320. In May 2016, it was announced that the Curaçao-Santo Domingo flight, as well as Panama, would be temporarily suspended and that operations would resume soon when able, although no reason was given for this. In July 2016, the airline celebrated the signing of their fourth aircraft, with its first Airbus A319. The aircraft was delivered to Aruba Airlines in December 2016.

Aruba Airlines announced on 2 October 2017, that it would be re-introducing service to Curaçao and introducing a new service to Bonaire. The flights would be operated with a Dash 8-300 that was signed for in September 2017, and that service to Curaçao would begin on 23 October 2017, with Bonaire's date to be announced. However, the first flight was canceled due to the Dash 8 aircraft not being delivered on time, and the airline officially commenced service to Curaçao on 25 October 2017, utilizing a Bombardier CRJ200, leased from Voyageur Airways, that was previously used to fly between Curaçao and Sint Maarten following the aftermath of Hurricane Irma.

In a press conference held live in Curaçao on 27 October 2017, Francisco Arendsz, the airlines' accountable manager, stated that the airline had planned to order an additional Dash 8-100, along with the original aircraft that was expected to be delivered as backup. This was when they revealed that the original aircraft was not ready. The current plan is to temporarily use the leased CRJ200. The second CRJ200 will be delivered, wearing the company's official livery. Bonaire was planned to commence on 16 November 2017, if Aruba Airlines was permitted by Dutch Civil Aviation Authority. Additional destinations planned for November include Barquisimeto and Punto Fijo. The press conference also reflected on the future of the airline, including destinations planned for 2018, which included New York City, Argentina, and Bogotá. Flights to Argentina and New York were planned to be flown by an Airbus A330 that had supposedly been ordered recently. On 14 November 2017, the inaugural flight to Curaçao, the CEO stated that next year there would be additional four aircraft, excluding the already ordered CRJ200 for next year.

Due to sanctions made by the Venezuelan government in the first half of 2018, the fleet renewal would be announced near the end of the year.

== Destinations ==
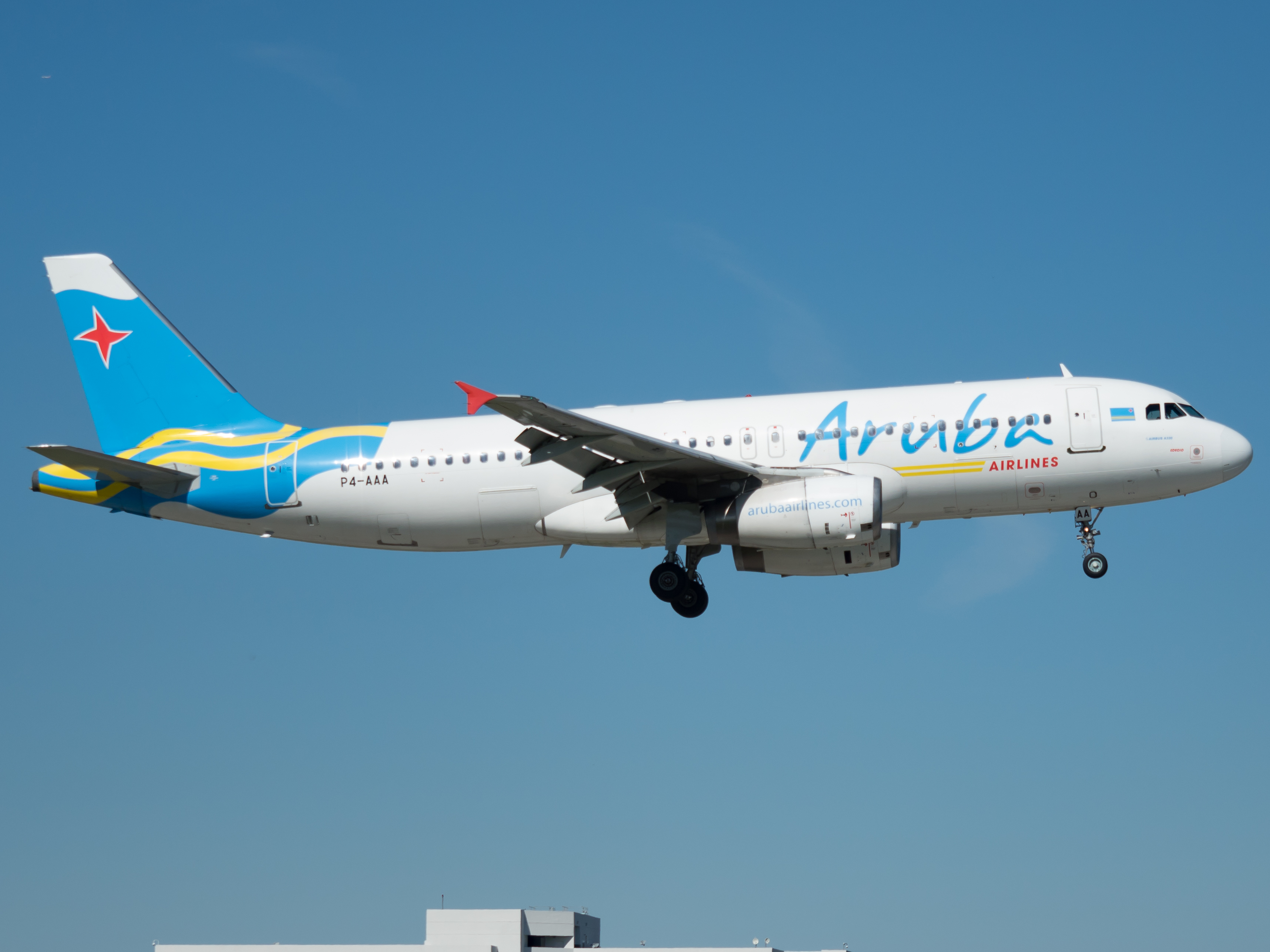
Former Aruba Airlines Airbus A320-200, 2016

As of December 2023, Aruba Airlines flies to the following destinations:

Country or territory	City	Airport	Notes	Refs
Aruba	Oranjestad	Queen Beatrix International Airport	Hub	
Bonaire	Kralendijk	Flamingo International Airport	Suspended	
Colombia	Barranquilla	Ernesto Cortissoz International Airport	Terminated	
Colombia	Medellín	José María Córdova International Airport	Terminated	
Colombia	Riohacha	Almirante Padilla Airport	Terminated	
Cuba	Camagüey	Ignacio Agramonte International Airport	Terminated	
Cuba	Havana	Jose Marti International Airport	Terminated	
Cuba	Holguín	Frank País Airport	Terminated	
Cuba	Santa Clara	Abel Santamaría Airport	Terminated	
Curaçao	Willemstad	Curaçao International Airport	Suspended	
Dominican Republic	Santo Domingo	Las Americas International Airport	Terminated	
Guyana	Georgetown	Cheddi Jagan International Airport		
Nicaragua	Managua	Augusto C. Sandino International Airport	Terminated	
Panama	Panama City	Tocumen International Airport	Terminated	
Trinidad and Tobago	Port of Spain	Piarco International Airport	Terminated	
United States	Miami	Miami International Airport	Operated by Global Crossing Airlines	
United States	Tampa	Tampa International Airport	Operated by Global Crossing Airlines	
Venezuela	Maracaibo	La Chinita International Airport	Terminated	
Venezuela	Las Piedras	Josefa Camejo International Airport	Terminated	
Venezuela	Maracay	Mariscal Sucre Airport	Terminated	
Venezuela	Valencia	Arturo Michelena International Airport	Terminated	

== Fleet ==
=== Current fleet ===
As of June 2026, Aruba Airlines operates the following aircraft:

Aruba Airlines fleet
Aircraft	In service	Orders	Passengers			Notes
Aircraft	In service	Orders	C	Y	Total	Notes
Airbus A320-200	1	—	–	180	180	
Total	1	—				

== See also ==
- List of airlines of the Netherlands Antilles
