= Air Aruba =

Airline of Aruba (1986–2000)

IATA	ICAO	Call sign
FQ	ARU	ARUBA
- Founded: 1986
- Ceased operations: October 23, 2000
- Hubs: Queen Beatrix International Airport
- Alliance: Aserca Airlines
- Fleet size: 26
- Destinations: 27
- Headquarters: Oranjestad, Aruba
- Key people: Tawa Irausquin (CEO); Peter Look Hong (CEO); Henri Coffie (CEO)
- Website: interknowledge.com/air-aruba/

Air Aruba was the main air carrier from the Dutch Caribbean island of Aruba. It was founded in 1986 and declared bankruptcy in 2000. It was headquartered in the Brown Invest Building in Oranjestad, Aruba.

== History ==
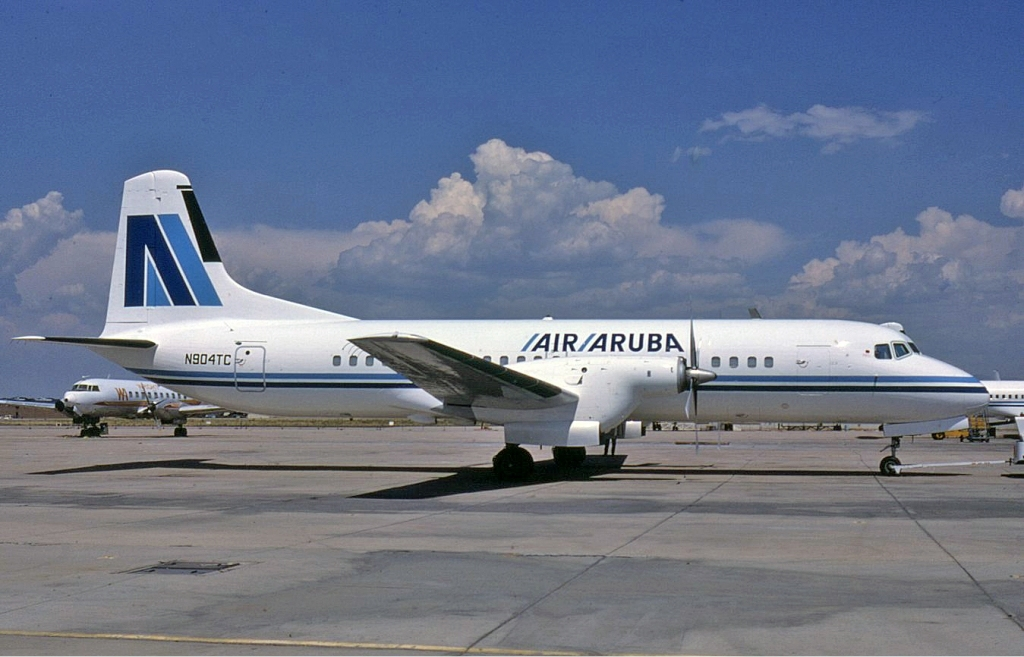
An Air Aruba NAMC YS-11 at Fort Worth Meacham International Airport in 1988

Air Aruba began in September 1986 as a ground handling agent for most airlines in Aruba. Two years after being founded, on August 18 to be precise, Air Aruba (with the help of KLM and later Air Holland) carried out its first commercial flight with a YS-11 turbo-prop type aircraft operating between the ABC islands of Aruba, Bonaire, and Curaçao, as well as Caracas, Venezuela. Over the years, Air Aruba expanded its schedule to various destinations in the Caribbean (Santo Domingo, Dominican Republic and St. Maarten), North America (Newark, Miami) and South America (São Paulo, Maracaibo, Las Piedras). Air Aruba also started flying across the Atlantic to Amsterdam and Cologne. This flight was initially operated in conjunction with Air Holland but was later assumed completely by Air Aruba. Subsequently, the fleet was also upgraded, shifting more from turbo-prop aircraft to jet aircraft, including the Boeing 727, 737, 757, and 767. On the ground, Air Aruba also kept developing, forming a new ground handling company as a subsidiary it jointly owned with Ogden Aviation Services. Air Aruba also expanded its reservations office in North America to meet the demand.

Carrying on the tradition of the Aruban people, Air Aruba strove to bring the friendliness of Aruba to the airline industry; however, financial problems made the Government of Aruba seek a new owner for the airline. On October 27, 1998, Air Aruba secured a takeover by the Venezuelan airline Aserca Airlines, which became the majority owner of Air Aruba. In December 1998, Air Aruba leased two brand new MD-90s, expanding the total fleet to 5 aircraft. At the same time, Air Aruba also inaugurated a route to Philadelphia and re-opened a route to Baltimore, making the total number of destinations to 10. In the competitive airline industry, it is important to have stable partnerships with other respected international airlines. Air Aruba had done so by developing fruitful partnerships with, among others, Continental Airlines and KLM. In March 1999, Air Aruba had established a far going agreement with Aserca Airlines and Air ALM to provide a better service in the Caribbean and South America for both its customers and its employees. The rising cost of operations and management caused Air Aruba to file bankruptcy in 2000. Air Aruba suspended its operations as of October 23, 2000.

== Destinations ==
=== Caribbean ===
Aruba (Hub)

- Oranjestad (Queen Beatrix International Airport)

Dominican Republic

- Santo Domingo (Las Américas International Airport)

Netherlands Antilles

- Kralendijk (Flamingo International Airport)
- Willemstad (Hato International Airport)
- Philipsburg (Princess Juliana International Airport)

=== Europe ===
Germany

- Cologne (Cologne Bonn Airport)

Netherlands

- Amsterdam (Amsterdam Schiphol Airport)

=== North America (United States) ===
Florida

- Miami (Miami International Airport)
- Orlando (Orlando International Airport)
- Tampa (Tampa International Airport)

New Jersey

- Newark (Newark Liberty International Airport)

Pennsylvania

- Philadelphia (Philadelphia International Airport)

Texas

- Houston (George Bush Intercontinental Airport)

Maryland

- Baltimore (Baltimore/Washington International Thurgood Marshall Airport)

=== South America ===
Brazil

- São Paulo (São Paulo/Guarulhos International Airport)
- Manaus (Eduardo Gomes International Airport)

Colombia

- Barranquilla (Ernesto Cortissoz International Airport)
- Bogotá (El Dorado International Airport)
- Cali (Alfonso Bonilla Aragón International Airport)
- Medellín (José María Córdova International Airport)

Venezuela

- Barcelona (Generál José Antonio Anzoátegui International Airport)
- Caracas (Simón Bolívar International Airport)
- Coro (José Leonardo Chirinos Airport)
- Isla de Margarita (Del Caribe International Airport)
- Las Piedras (Josefa Camejo International Airport)
- Maracaibo (La Chinita International Airport)
- Valencia (Arturo Michelena International Airport)

== Fleet history ==
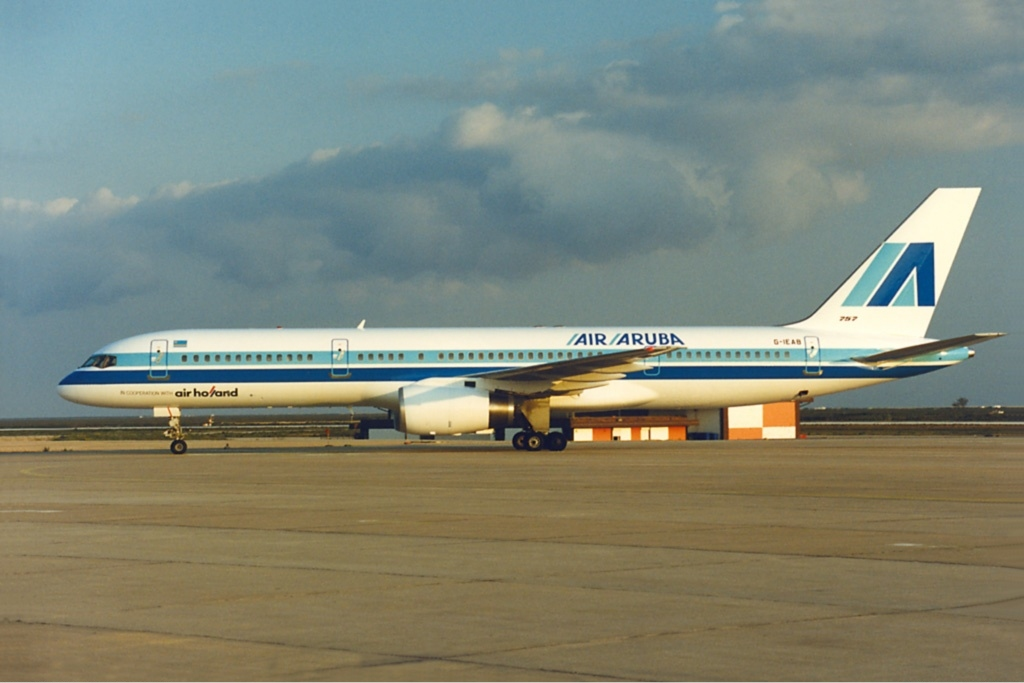
An Air Aruba Boeing 757-200 leased from Air Holland at Portugal in 1990

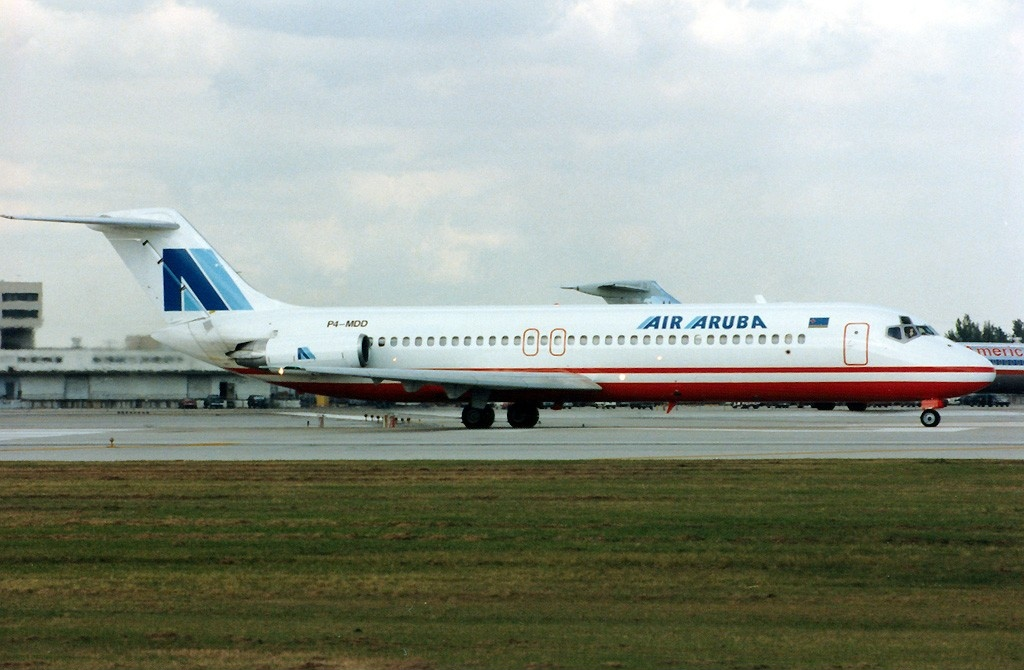
An Air Aruba McDonnell Douglas DC-9-31 at Miami International Airport in 1993

Air Aruba's NAMC YS-11s were the first acquired aircraft to be introduced into their fleet. After some time, Air Aruba initially replaced them with an Embraer EMB-120. Later on, they acquired a Boeing 757-200 (to fly to Miami). Furthermore, the fleet size expanded by introducing aircraft from Boeing with the latter aircraft type operating flights to Europe as well as some U.S. routes. In the last operating years of Air Aruba, only the McDonnell Douglas DC-9, MD-80 and MD-90 were operated by Air Aruba until the airline closed its doors.

Air Aruba's fleet consisted of the following aircraft:

Air Aruba fleet
Aircraft	Total	Introduced	Retired	Notes
Boeing 727-100	1	1991	1991	Leased from Hapag-Lloyd Flug
Boeing 737-300	2	1990	1992	Leased from Trans European Airways
Boeing 757-200	2	1990	1992	
Boeing 767-200	1	1991	1992	Leased from Air New Zealand
Boeing 767-200ER	1	1992	1992	Leased from Britannia Airways
Boeing 767-300ER	1	1992	1993	Leased from Aer Lingus
Embraer EMB-120 Brasilia	1	1990	1993	
McDonnell Douglas DC-9-30	3	1993	2000	
McDonnell Douglas MD-83	3	1992	1998	
McDonnell Douglas MD-88	2	1992	2000	Transferred to Southeast Airlines
McDonnell Douglas MD-90-30	3	1998	2000	
NAMC YS-11A/213	6	1988	1993	

== See also ==
- List of defunct airlines of the Netherlands Antilles
