= Tiara Air =

Airline of Aruba

Tiara Air Aruba
IATA	ICAO	Call sign
3P	TNM	TIARA
- Founded: 2006
- Commenced operations: 6 April 2006
- Ceased operations: 28 November 2016
- Hubs: Aruba, Queen Beatrix International Airport
- Focus cities: Kralendijk, Bonaire, Flamingo International Airport; Willemstad, Curaçao, Hato International Airport
- Fleet size: 4
- Destinations: 12
- Headquarters: Sabana Blanco, Oranjestad, Aruba
- Key people: Alejandro Muyale (director/CEO/MD)
- Website: www.tiara-air.com

Tiara Air N.V., operating as Tiara Air Aruba, was an airline headquartered in Oranjestad, Aruba in the Dutch Caribbean. The airline, which began operations in 2006, operated scheduled flights to Bonaire, Colombia, Curacao, the United States and Venezuela. The airlines fleet consisted of the Shorts 360 and Boeing 737 aircraft for passenger operations, with a Learjet 35 for ambulance and private operations.

Tiara Air resumed its operations after being affected by the issues resolving the Venezuela currency crisis.

The airline was declared bankrupt on 28 November 2016.

== History ==
The airline was founded by Alejandro Muyale, whose family owns and performs Ground Handling Services at the Queen Beatrix International Airport in Aruba for over 30 years under the name of General Air Services (GenAir), as well as offering services in Curacao for over 6 years under the name Antillean Flight Services (AFS). Mr. Muyale fulfilled his dream of applying for certification with the Department of Civil Aviation (DCA) in Aruba. The Economic Authority had been granted an aircraft, a 36-seater Shorts 360 with a second aircraft purchased soon afterward – both from Pacific Coastal Airlines in Canada. Mr. Muyale named the airline after his daughter Tiara Muyale. The word "tiara" is derived from Latin, meaning the word"crown". The company logo of Tiara Air, included a crown on top of the T, representing a Tiara.

In 2008, it was announced that the airline would replace its two Shorts 360, with Saab 340A's with a much greater range as well as introducing new routes in the region and expanding services to current destinations. As of December 2012, the airline still operates its two shorts 360, although a Saab 340 had been leased on occasion.

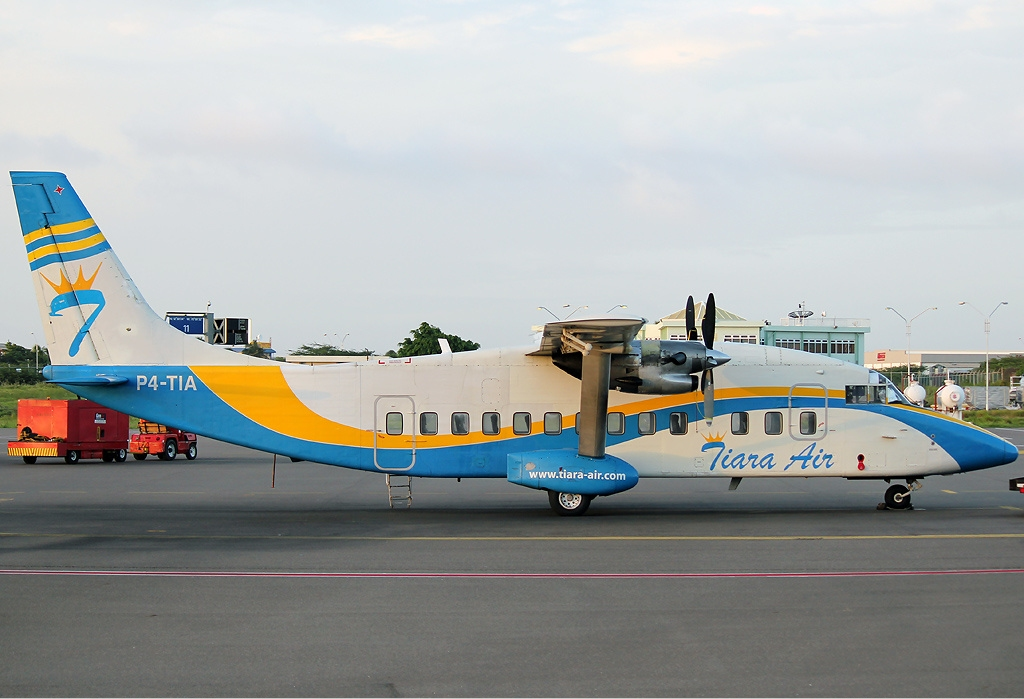
A Tiara Air Short 360 at Aruba Airport in its Old Colors (2011).

In 2010, Tiara Air was the official airline for the Aruba International Film Festival. Because of this, an official billboard-like sticker was added on the fuselage of one of the airline's Shorts 360 (P4-TIB). The aircraft carried this special livery between Spring 2010 and Summer 2010. The following years, a poster-size sticker was added near the main exit door of both aircraft as promotion for the festival.

As of October 2010, the airline now offered various new services to customers in the form of the option for online check-in, new cargo services which were available for operations between the islands of Aruba, Bonaire & Curaçao and also including the airport tax for the islands of Aruba, Bonaire, and Curaçao, in purchased tickets.

Due to the Venezuelan Airline Crisis, Tiara Air suspended its services in 2014 with several attempts to restart. In early 2016, it was revealed that the airlines formed a partnership with Venezuela's Avior Airlines which would result in Avior's aid to the airline financially as well as leasing aircraft to the airline to help with its reestablishment. The airline restarted services to Curacao in April 2016 and will recommence service to Las Piedras in May 2016 using one of its remaining Shorts 360.

=== Air ambulance service ===
In March 2011, the airline announced it would be soon offering Air Ambulance and Private Jet Services which will be operated by a Learjet 35. The ambulance service was operated with advanced life support-equipment and medical and nursing staff that were 24 hours on call. Service was offered between regional hospitals in Aruba, Bonaire and Curaçao and cities with larger hospitals in Colombia, typically Barranquilla, Cali, Bogota, Medellin and Bucaramanga. Private Jet services were available to both insurance companies and private customers.

=== Agreement with Insel Air ===
In April 2011, Tiara Air and the Aruban government announced a collaboration with Curaçao's national airline Insel Air. The collaboration should enforce the optimal use of the touristic routes to Aruba.

In order to serve passengers best, the agreement was valid for all routes that both airlines operated. The Aruban government also stated that it was committed to releasing an AOC (Air Operating Certificate) to Insel Air within three months, making it possible for Insel Air to also proceed as an Aruban airline under the name "Insel Air Aruba."

Due to the AOC, Insel Air Aruba was able to operate many touristic flights to Aruba, therefore creating more inbound flights for the island.

According to Mr. E.K. Heerenveen, Chief General, and International Affairs, "In this new agreement Insel Air Aruba will operate three Fokker 50 and one MD-80 increasing the total availability of seats to 50.000 a month. Due to the cooperation with Tiara Air an extra 40.000 seats per month will be added, totaling to 90.000 seats per month.

=== Jet era ===
Early 2011, Tiara Air announced it would begin service to 3 new Colombian destinations, after complying with all the requirements and norms based on the rules and regulations of the Aeronautics of Colombia, better known as RAC. The petition for Tiara Air was approved to provide International Air Transport service to both passengers and cargo in the then newly announced Colombian routes. In November 2011, the airline announced plans to lease its first official Jet aircraft with which it would be using to expand the airline's network into further destinations in Colombia and Venezuela, as well as the introduction of flights to the United States. The aircraft arrived in Aruba on 16 February 2012. The second 737-300 was planned for 2013. The airline held a campaign on its official Facebook page for their fans to pick a name for the upcoming addition to the fleet. The name had to have an affinity to with Aruba. Around 400 people participated and the campaign came to a tie between the names "Shoco" and "Arawak", with "Arawak" being the winner.

Along with the introduction of the airline's 737-300, the airline, along with the Aruba Airport Authority N.V.(AAA) opened a hangar to cope with a demand for a hangar to perform maintenance on the airline's fleet. The 42x45 meter hangar, located on the southwest of the Reina Beatrix International Airport, was welcomed with a soft opening on 13 July 2012, and is capable of handling an aircraft with the wingspan of a Boeing 737-500 and the maximum load of a Boeing 737-400, and during the opening, Tiara Air Aruba's own Boeing 737-300 was towed into the hangar effortlessly. The hangar is equipped with a system of fire suppression consisting of both sprinklers and foam under pressure which is automatically activated in case of fire. It has offices, restrooms and showers and storage space for parts. These areas are fully air-conditioned. The floor of the hangar is completely covered with a special seal meant to repel dust according to international standards of hangars.

As of 2016, the Boeing 737-300 has been returned to its lessor, with plans for it to be replaced with larger Boeing 737-400's as part of the airline's restructuring and partnership with Avior Airlines.

== Operations ==
=== Headquarters and offices ===
Tiara Air's corporate headquarters was located in Sabana Blanco, Aruba. The headquarters included the main ticket agency, marketing, and administration, as well as an operations office. The airline also has an office at the airport and has grown to open a third office in the Sun Plaza. he airline also has official offices at each of its destinations. Most notably, in November 2008, a service center had been introduced on the island of Curaçao in addition to the airport office. and on 18 July 2010, a service center had been introduced on the island of Bonaire in addition to the main office at the airport.

During its operations, the KIU System was used for its reservations and check-in, which began in 2011. Prior to using the KIU System, the airline previously used the E-Sav reservation system.

=== Branding and livery ===
In 2011, through a campaign to promote the island of Aruba, Tiara Air had been branded as the official airline of Aruba. Because of this, most of Tiara Air's fleet had received the official logo of Aruba applied on their fuselage. The modified livery on the Shorts 360 features yellow and blue stripes on the lower part of the fuselage with a grey belly, the logo's signature T, and the crown featured on the vertical stabilizer and Tiara Air written above the forward emergency exits along with the star of the Aruban flag. The wheel pants are also grey of color and feature the aircraft type on it written as SD-360 on the aircraft. One aircraft features the official Aruba logo on the forward fuselage with a blue tail with the T and crown in white. The website is also featured.

The 737 features a similar livery with the Aruba on the forward fuselage along with the yellow and blue stripes but does not have a grey belly. The airline also has the blue tail with the white T and crown. The airline's logo is featured above the emergency exit doors on each side and the website is featured on the engines. The aircraft is named "Arawak". Since mid-September 2012, the T on the tail has been modified and the website on the engines have been removed and the logo above the emergency exits have been replaced by the before mentioned website.

Tiara Air's first official livery was painted on the airline's first SD3-60 (P4-TIA), and featured two waving (yellow and blue) lines on the fuselage with the logo's T and the crown featured on the vertical stabilizer and the waving Aruba flag on the top part. The logo was featured on both sides of the fuselage and the company's slogan (written in Papiamentu) "Na Ora, Comodo y Sympatico" (roughly translated) "On Time, Accommodating and Sympatico" written on the left side. The airline's website was also featured on the Wheel Pants and on top of the aircraft's back exits. The second aircraft (P4-TIB) entered the fleet with a hybrid of its previous owner Pacific Coastal Airlines and the Tiara Air logo near the emergency exits. The aircraft then returned to the fleet in 2009, after a C-Check, all white with stickers applied representing Tiara Air, but were later removed until the aircraft received its latest colors. At one point the aircraft also wore a large sticker promoting the Aruba International Film Festival in 2010.

=== Logo ===
During the airline's operations, the airline's logo has gone through revisions instead of completely changing the font or style in any drastic way.

2006-2011

2011-2012

2012-2014

2014-2016

== Destinations ==
Tiara Air had operated scheduled flights to 10 destinations across the Dutch Caribbean, Colombia, the United States and Venezuela from Aruba. Scheduled flights were also operated between the islands of Bonaire and Curacao.

Tiara Air's most served destination was to Las Piedras/Punto Fijo. The route was once served by Santa Bárbara Airlines, but since the airline suspended flights between Aruba and Las Piedras, Tiara Air began operating daily scheduled service to Las Piedras.

City	Country	IATA	ICAO	Airport
Armenia	Colombia	AXM	SKAR	El Edén International Airport
Caracas	Venezuela	CCS	SVMI	Simón Bolivar International Airport
Fort Lauderdale	United States	FLL	KFLL	Fort Lauderdale – Hollywood International Airport
Kralendijk	Bonaire	BON	TNCB	Flamingo International Airport
Maracaibo	Venezuela	MAR	SVMC	La Chinita International Airport
Medellín	Colombia	MDE	SKRG	José María Córdova International Airport
Miami	United States	MIA	KMIA	Miami International Airport
Oranjestad	Aruba	AUA	TNCA	Queen Beatrix International Airport
Philipsburg	Sint Maarten	SXM	TNCM	Princess Juliana International Airport
Punto Fijo	Venezuela	LSP	SVJC	Josefa Camejo International Airport
Riohacha	Colombia	RCH	SKRH	Almirante Padilla Airport
Willemstad	Curaçao	CUR	TNCC	Hato International Airport

== Fleet ==
The Tiara Air fleet consisted of the following aircraft:

Tiara Air Fleet
Aircraft	Total	Passengers	Notes
Boeing 737-300	1	141	
Learjet 35A	1	7	Air Ambulance and VIP/Charter service
Shorts 360	2(+1^)	36	Used for parts^

Future plans included acquiring leased Boeing 737-400's and Fokker 50's as part of a partnership with Avior Airlines.

Other aircraft operated as leased from other airlines include:

- 1 Cessna 208B Grand Caravan (leased from Albatros Airlines)
- 2 Embraer 120 Brasilia (leased from Albatros Airlines)
- 1 Shorts 360 (leased from Comeravia)

== In-flight service ==
Although fairly small, the airline offered in-flight amenities onboard all of its passenger aircraft. Onboard the Shorts 360, flights longer than 30 minutes offered a juice box and cookies. Early morning flights such as to Bonaire & Curaçao offered pastechis (a type of empanada) along with juice boxes, as well as a copy of one of three different newspapers. On flights to Maracaibo and Riohacha, the airlines served cheese sandwiches instead of the pastechis. Onboard the Boeing 737, complimentary meals were offered.

== Incidents and accidents ==
On 5 December 2011, Tiara Air Aruba performing flight 3P 208 (with registration P4-TIA) from Las Piedras/Punto Fijo Josefa Camejo International Airport to Queen Beatrix International Airport in Oranjestad, with 29 passengers and 4 crew, made an emergency landing in Aruba, after the aircraft hit a donkey on the runway of Las Piedras/Punto Fijo with its right main gear just after becoming airborne causing the right main gear to be bent backward. The crew decided to continue to Aruba because of better facilities available at Aruba, which is a distance of 50 mi (81 km). The aircraft landed safely at Aruba with no injury on board, although the right main gear had sustained substantial structural damage and was partially collapsed, no injuries occurred.
