= PAWA Dominicana =

Flag carrier of the Dominican Republic (2002–2018)

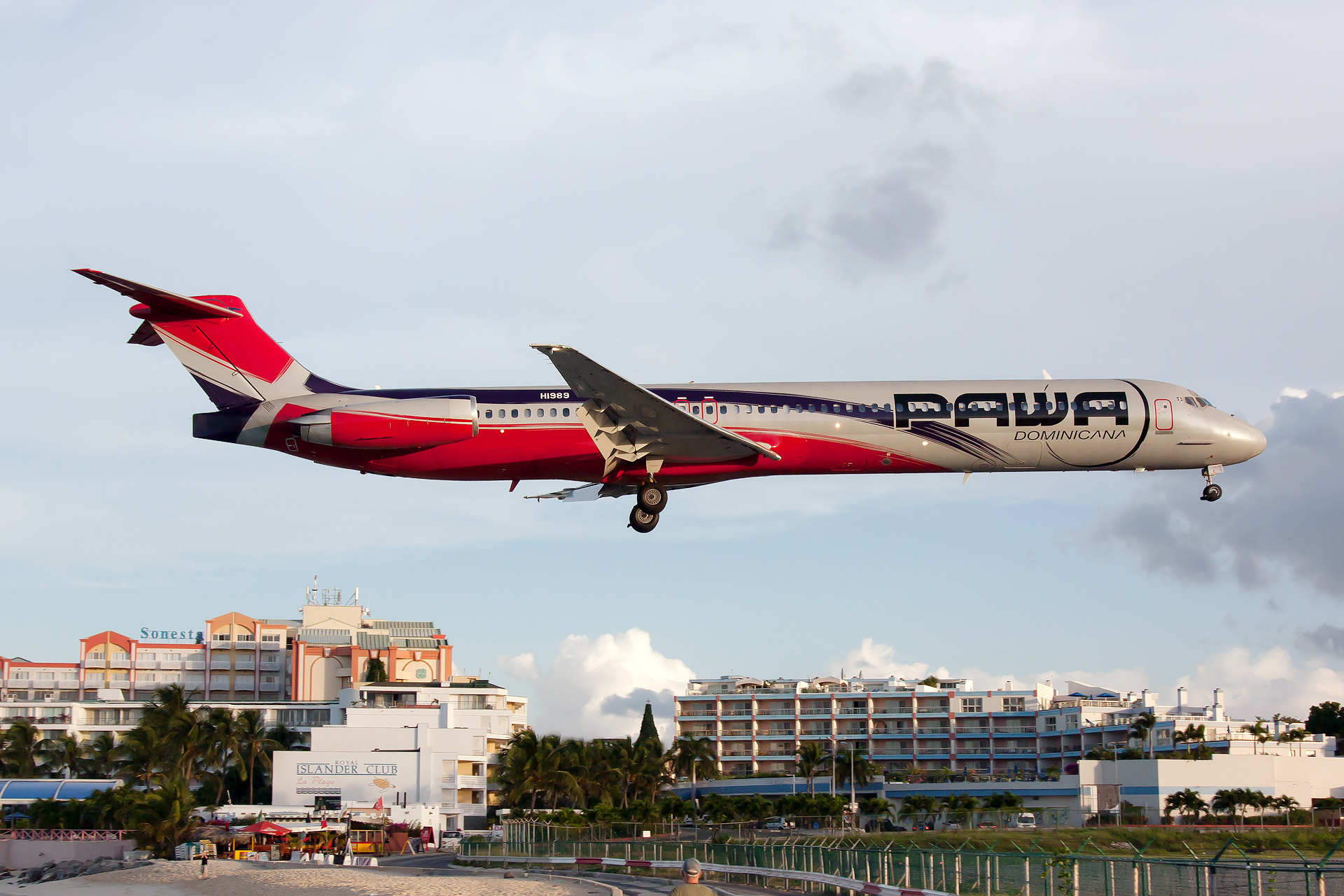
- A PAWA Dominicana McDonnell Douglas MD-83 approaching Princess Juliana International Airport in 2016
IATA	ICAO	Call sign
7N	PWD	PAWA
- Founded: September 30, 2002
- Commenced operations: October 1, 2007
- Ceased operations: February 2, 2018
- Hubs: Las Américas International Airport
- Frequent-flyer program: Preference
- Alliance: Aserca Airlines
- Fleet size: 6
- Destinations: 8
- Parent company: Grupo Cóndor C.A.
- Headquarters: Santo Domingo, Dominican Republic
- Key people: Simeon Garcia (Owner); Gary Stone (CEO); Alexander Barrios (Director of Corporate Affairs)
- Website: pawadominicana.com (out of order)

PAWA Dominicana (legally Pan Am World Airways Dominicana, C x A) was the international flag carrier of the Dominican Republic. It was created as a subsidiary airline for Pan American Airways. This airline had scheduled flights between Santo Domingo and other Caribbean and US destinations. It was based at Santo Domingo-Las Americas.

Authority for several international routes was suspended on January 28, 2018. As of February 2018, the airline has ceased all of its operations. The airline's failure would be the first test of the nation's new bankruptcy law.

== History ==
PAWA Dominicana was created in 2002 as a subsidiary of Pan American Airways, which had also operated within a strategic alliance with Boston-Maine Airways. In April 2005, Servair, a Dominican corporation dedicated to offering services to airlines in all airports in the Dominican Republic, acquired the airline completely and began a new certification process within the framework of the new Dominican regulations, which allowed the company to operate under local control.

In May 2007, the company received the Air Operator Certificate Part 121 from the Dominican Institute of Civil Aviation (IDAC), which allows the airline to operate regular services from the Dominican Republic to North, Central, and South America, as well as the Caribbean region and charter services around the world. The first flight took place on October 1, 2007.

On June 4, 2010, the company was purchased by a group of airline professionals and they appointed Mrs. Mirtha Espada as the company's president.

In February 2012, the airline temporarily ceased scheduled services but continued operating charter services. In March 2012, the company appointed Hector Gomez as president, with the task of reorienting the company and calling back the former company's founder and owner as a part of the organization.

The airline secured its air operator certificate in mid-October 2014 and started services using 4 McDonnell Douglas MD-80s and restarted operations on August 14, 2015.

On January 26, 2018, PAWA was suspended under the allegation of non-payment, since they owed more than $3 million to the Dominican authorities, among them the Civil Aviation Board, the Dominican Institute of Civil Aviation, and the Dominican Airport's company, 21st Century. Due to this, the JAC suspended the airline for 90 days and was not allowed to travel, therefore, it generated many complaints from passengers who were stranded in air terminals. On February 2, 2018, a new element was added due to the suspension, and that is the lack of maintenance to the airline's fleet. PAWA's related Venezuelan airline, SBA Airlines, was also suspended by its country's authorities on the same day and for similar reasons in April of the same year. The company closed legally on August 6, 2019, by the authority of the Dominican aviation IDAC.

== Operations ==
PAWA Dominicana authority included international charter services and scheduled services to Antigua, Aruba, Curaçao, Havana, San Juan, and St. Maarten from their Santo Domingo hub with several flights a week on the MD-80 and DC-9.

PAWA was working to consolidate flights to New York and Miami (the latter service started in November 2016) and other Caribbean Islands. The company's goal was stated as "to make SDQ the HUB of the Caribbean." PAWA would have planned flights from Santiago and Punta Cana to Miami, New York, and San Juan.

== Destinations ==
As of January 28, 2018, PAWA Dominicana served the following destinations:

Country	City	Airport	Notes	Refs
Antigua and Barbuda	St. John's	V. C. Bird International Airport	Via Sint Maarten	
Aruba	Oranjestad	Queen Beatrix International Airport		
Cuba	Havana	José Martí International Airport		
Curaçao	Willemstad	Hato International Airport		
Dominican Republic	Santo Domingo	Las Americas International Airport	Hub	
Haiti	Port-au-Prince	Toussaint Louverture International Airport	Terminated	
Puerto Rico	San Juan	Luis Muñoz Marín International Airport		
Sint Maarten	Philipsburg	Princess Juliana International Airport		
United States	Miami	Miami International Airport		

=== Codeshare agreements ===
PAWA had codeshare agreements with the following airlines:

- Aserca Airlines
- Air Europa

== Fleet ==
=== Final fleet ===
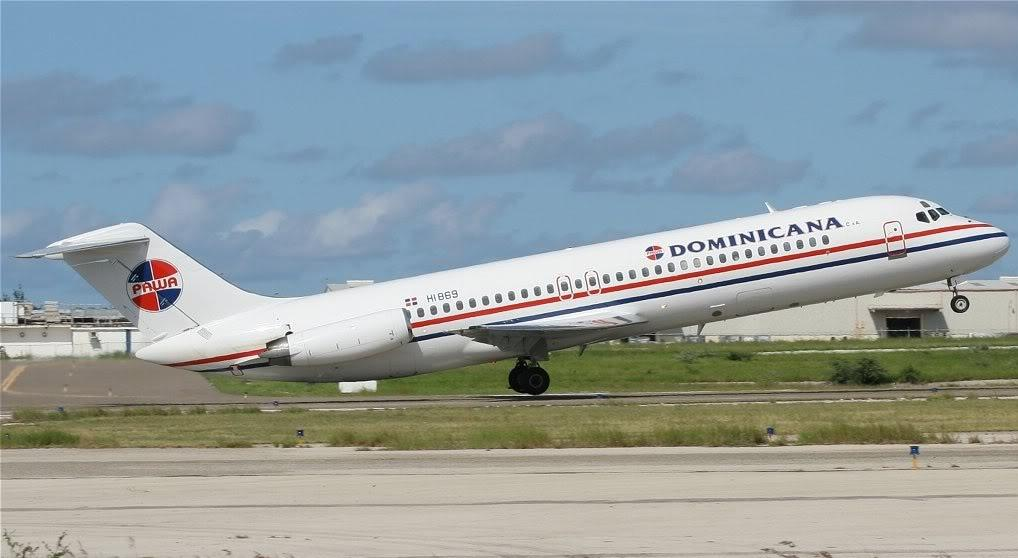
A former PAWA Dominicana McDonnell Douglas DC-9-32

As of August 2017, the fleet of PAWA Dominicana consisted of the following aircraft:

Aircraft	In service	Orders	Passengers			Notes
Aircraft	In service	Orders	C	Y	Total	Notes
Boeing 757-200	—	1	TBA			Intended to be transferred from SBA Airlines.
Bombardier CRJ200LR	—	6	–	50	50	Intended for use under the PAWA Connection banner.
McDonnell Douglas MD-82	1	—	–	160	160	
McDonnell Douglas MD-83	4	—	–	160	160	
McDonnell Douglas MD-87	1	1	12	97	109	
Total	6	8				

=== Former fleet ===
PAWA Dominicana formerly operated the following types:

Aircraft	Total	Introduced	Retired	Notes
British Aerospace Jetstream 31	2	2005	2012	
Cirrus SR-22	1	2015	2016	
McDonnell Douglas DC-9-32	3	2008	2017	

== See also ==
- Aserca Airlines
- List of defunct airlines of the Dominican Republic
- SBA Airlines
