= Santa Bárbara Airlines Flight 518 =

2008 aviation accident in Venezuela

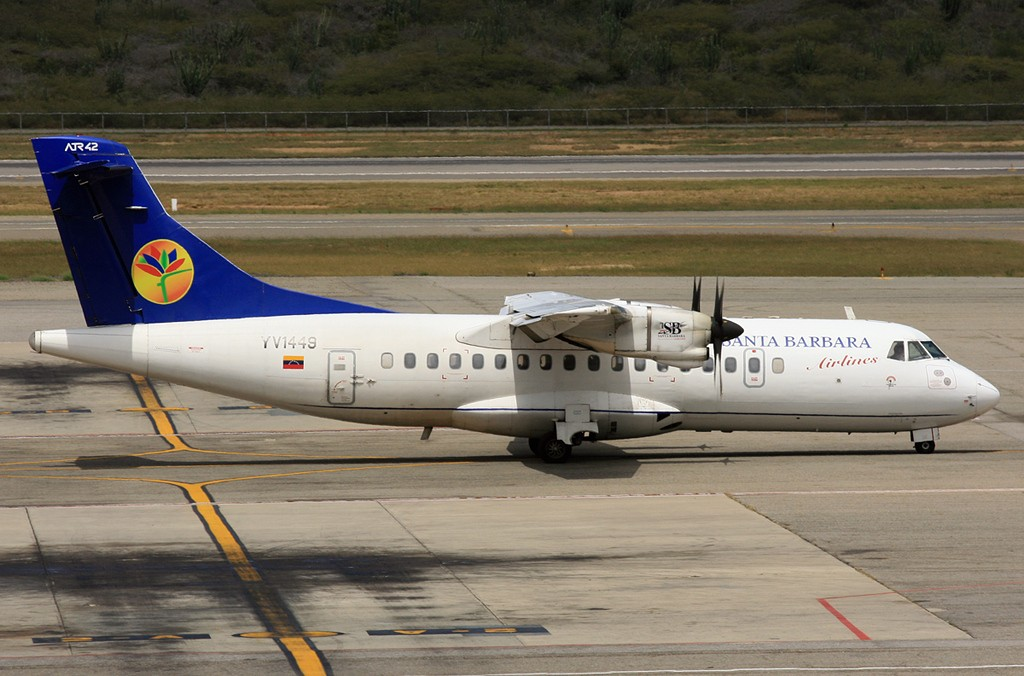
- YV1449, the aircraft involved, photographed four days before the accident

Accident
- Date: 21 February 2008
- Summary: Controlled flight into terrain due to pilot error and navigational error
- Site: Northwest of Alberto Carnevalli Airport, Mérida, Venezuela; 8°39′33″N 71°14′17″W

Aircraft
- Aircraft type: ATR 42-300
- Operator: Santa Bárbara Airlines
- IATA flight No.: S3518
- ICAO flight No.: BBR518
- Call sign: SANTA BARBARA 518
- Registration: YV1449
- Flight origin: Alberto Carnevalli Airport, Mérida, Venezuela
- Destination: Simón Bolívar International Airport, Caracas, Venezuela
- Occupants: 46
- Passengers: 43
- Crew: 3
- Fatalities: 46
- Survivors: 0

Santa Bárbara Airlines Flight 518 was an ATR 42–300 twin-turboprop aircraft, registration YV1449, operating as a scheduled domestic flight from Mérida, Venezuela, to Caracas that crashed into the side of a mountain on 21 February 2008, shortly after take-off. There were 43 passengers on board, with a crew consisting of two pilots and a flight attendant. The wreckage was discovered a day later with no survivors. It was the deadliest aviation accident involving an ATR 42 until Trigana Air Flight 267 crashed in Papua, Indonesia, in 2015 with 54 deaths.

== Background ==
Mérida, a university and tourist town located high in the Andes mountains, is surrounded by higher terrain with night flights prohibited at the nearby Alberto Carnevalli Airport.

=== Aircraft ===
The aircraft involved was a 22 year old ATR-42-300, registered YV1449. The aircraft had the manufacturing number of 028 and had 37,138 total flight cycles. The aircraft was also equipped with 2 Pratt & Whitney Canada PW120 engines.

=== Crew ===
On the flight deck was Captain Aldino Garanito Gómez (36), a senior pilot for the airline and flight instructor with more than 5,000 flight hours logged, and First Officer Denis Ferreira Quintal (29), who had more than 2,000 flight hours.

== Flight history ==
On 21 February 2008, Flight 518 was the last scheduled flight out of the airport, departing at about 17:00 local time. Shortly after take-off, the twin-turboprop slammed into a sheer 4,000-metre (13,000 ft) rock wall called "Indian Face" (Spanish: La Cara del Indio). No distress calls were received from the aircraft prior to impact.

== Crash site ==
Antonio Rivero, national director of civil defense, said rescuers had identified the site of the crash in the south-western state of Mérida. Civil defense regional chief Gerardo Rojas stated that rescue crews were racing to the poorly-accessible crash site in the Andes Mountains. Mountain villagers reported hearing a tremendous noise they thought could be from a crash soon after the disappearance and loss of contact with Flight 518. According to local police, the wreckage of the aircraft was located at Páramo de Mucuchíes, in the sector of Collao del Cóndor, Páramo Piedra Blanca, near the Laguna de la Perlada. The search operation was conducted from the regional hub city of Barinas in western Venezuela.

Air-rescue services said that the airliner crashed 10 kilometres (6 mi) from the mountain city of Mérida after take-off. Searchers spotted the wreckage of the plane carrying 43 passengers and 3 crew members in the mountains of western Venezuela on Friday, 22 February 2008. Fire-fighter Sgt. Jhonny Paz said officials believed there were no survivors and were sending a helicopter to the site of the accident after a refueling stop. "The impact was direct. The aircraft is practically pulverized," he told the Venezuelan television station Globovisión. At the national civil aeronautical institute, General Ramón Vinas confirmed that, "by the type of impact, we presume that there are no survivors".

== Passengers ==
As search-and-rescue activities were underway, local media published the passenger list of Sánta Barbara Airlines Flight 518. Most of the victims were Venezuelan; five Colombians and an American also died in the crash.

Family members and friends of the victims created a website with information related to the crash and its victims.

Fatalities
Nationality	Passengers	Crew	Total
Venezuela	37	3	40
Colombia	5	0	5
United States	1	0	1
Total	43	3	46

== Investigation ==
The cockpit voice recorder (CVR) was successfully recovered from the wreckage. Preliminary information released on 28 July 2008, indicates the crew departed Mérida with inoperative navigation equipment and subsequently became disoriented in the mountainous terrain surrounding the airport, crashing into the side of a mountain while trying to determine their location. Subsequent investigation concluded that the pilots took off without conducting the mandatory pre-flight procedures and used an unauthorised departure route.

A report by LagAd Aviation determined that the cause of the accident was the omission or improper use of the checklists and procedures critical to the operation of the flight, causing the Attitude and Heading Reference System (AHRS) to not be initialized prior to the take-off roll. The pilots wanted to meet the schedule after experiencing some delays, including losing track of time while having coffee in the terminal, then finding that the passengers were already on board the plane. The time pressure was a factor that led the pilots to omit the use of the checklists and perform the pre-takeoff so fast that it was impossible to perform the necessary verification procedures to ensure safety. The second cause of the accident was the decision to take off when they had already become aware that the AHRS was inoperative, due to the overconfidence of the pilots, as the captain had avoided catastrophe on a previous flight when proceeding without AHRS from the same airport. From the moment power is turned on, the aircraft must sit stationary for 180 seconds for the AHRS to synchronize its settings, which is not an issue given how long the pilots will take to complete their checklists; instead, these pilots rushed their checklist, skipped some steps, and knowingly chose to begin their take-off rather than wait an additional 28 seconds for the AHRS to be synchronized. Flying without the AHRS meant that the pilots could not maintain the correct heading in the limited visibility of clouds on their ascent.

== In popular culture ==
The crash of Flight 518 was covered in "28 Seconds To Survive", a Season 12 (2013) episode of the internationally syndicated Canadian TV documentary series Mayday. The documentary points out that the crash led authorities to deem the airport too dangerous for commercial flights, which were suspended. Commercial service resumed in 2014, after being suspended for five years.
