= Mariscal Sucre Airport (Venezuela) =

Mariscal Sucre Airport Escuela Mariscal Sucre Airport
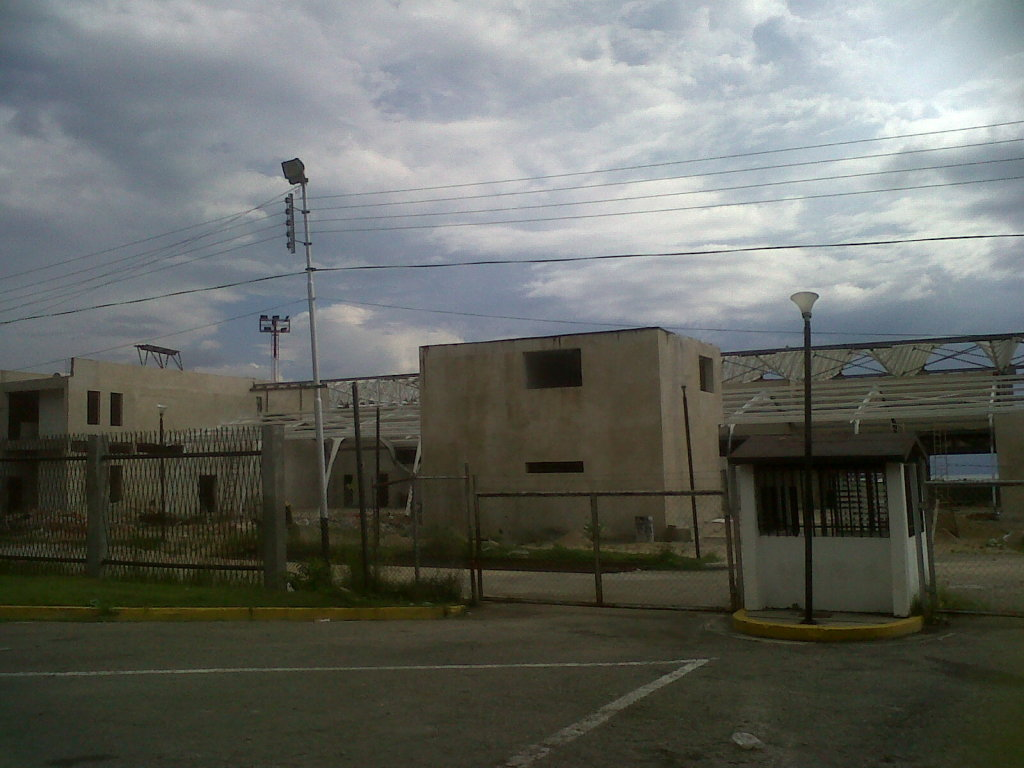
- IATA: MYC; ICAO: SVBS

Summary
- Airport type: Public/Military
- Serves: Maracay
- Location: Aragua, Venezuela
- Hub for: Albatros Airlines, Emtrasur Cargo
- Elevation AMSL: 1,339 ft / 408 m
- Coordinates: 10°15′00″N 67°38′58″W

Map
- Location of the airport in Venezuela

Runways
Direction	Length		Surface
Direction	m	ft	Surface
11/29	2,000	6,562	Asphalt
06/24	1,300	4,265	Asphalt
- Sources: GCM Google Maps

Mariscal Sucre Airport (IATA: MYC, ICAO: SVBS) is an airport in the Aragua state of Venezuela, serving the city of Maracay. The airport is on the northeastern shore of Lake Valencia also named Los Tacariguas Lake . The airport is named in honor of Antonio José de Sucre, a leader of the Venezuelan War of Independence and the second president of Bolivia. Runway 11/29 length does not include an 85-metre (279 ft) displaced threshold for Runway 29. Runway 06/24 has a 53-metre (174 ft) paved overrun on each end.

Within the facilities of this air base, public and private institutions of the civil and military spheres of the Venezuelan aeronautical world operate. There is the Autonomous Bolivarian Service at Aragua Tacarigua Airport, formerly the Autonomous Service at Aragua Florencio Gómez Airport. It was opened to the civilian population in November 2010 to provide an air alternative to the inhabitants of Aragua, who previously had to resort to Valencia, Carabobo or Caracas to take air links.

Also here are historical military units of the Bolivarian Military Aviation of Venezuela (AMB in Spanish) formerly called the Venezuelan Air Force (FAV in Spanish), among which there are the Air Training Group No. 14 founded in 1920 and the Academy Military Technician of the AMB founded in 1951.

== See also ==
- Transport in Venezuela
- List of airports in Venezuela
