= Alberto Carnevalli Airport =

Airport in Venezuela

Alberto Carnevalli Airport Aeropuerto Alberto Carnevalli
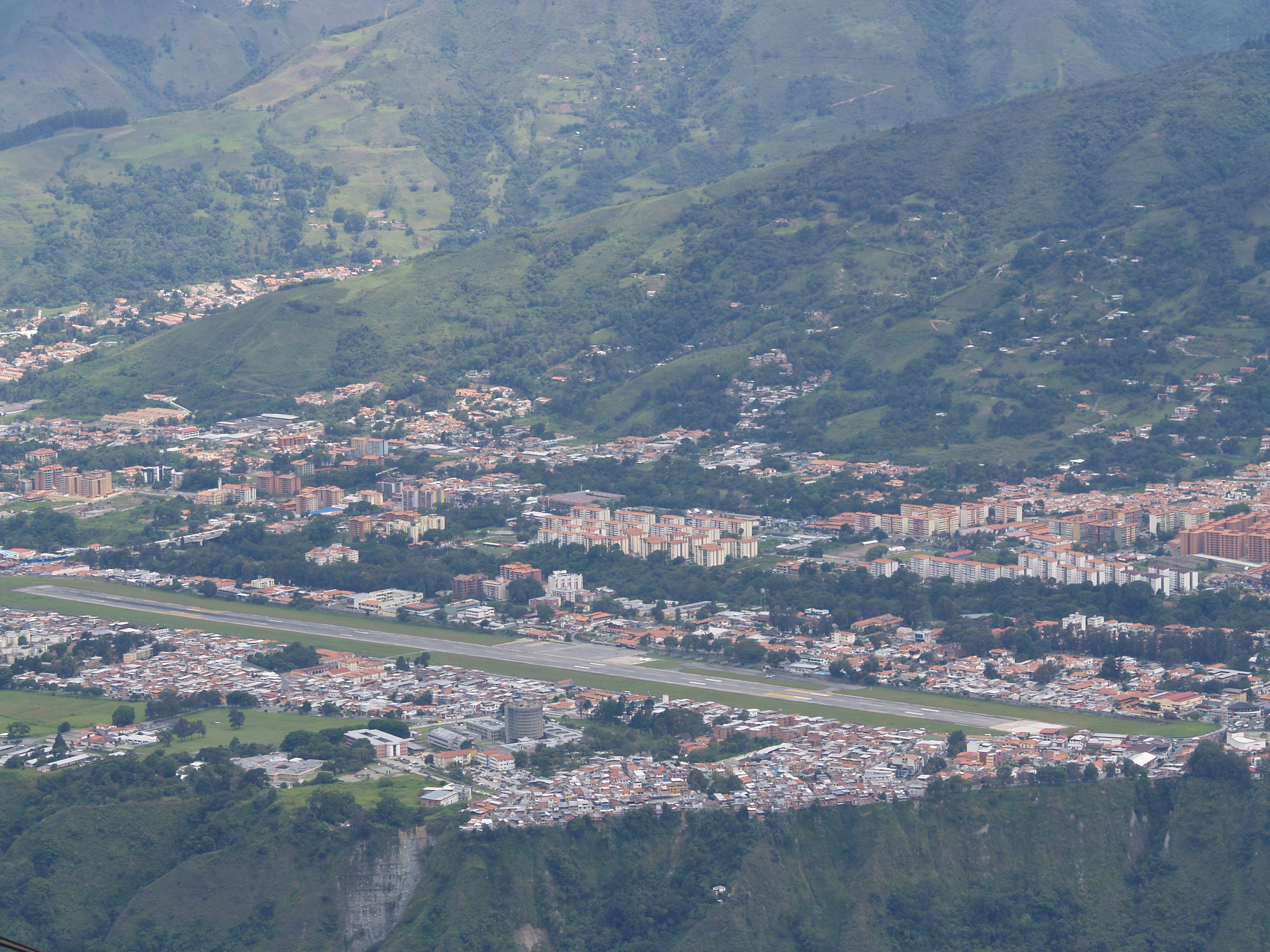
- IATA: MRD; ICAO: SVMD

Summary
- Airport type: Public
- Owner/Operator: SAPAM
- Serves: Mérida, Venezuela
- Elevation AMSL: 5,007 ft (1,526 m)
- Coordinates: 08°34′56″N 071°09′40″W

Map
- Location of the airport in Venezuela

Runways
Direction	Length		Surface
Direction	m	ft	Surface
07/25	1,630	5,348	Asphalt
- WAD GCM Google Maps

Alberto Carnevalli Airport (IATA: MRD, ICAO: SVMD) is an airport located 3 km (1.9 mi) southwest of downtown Mérida, the capital of Mérida State in Venezuela. It is named in honor of Alberto Carnevalli (es), a Venezuelan lawyer and political activist.

The airport is in the Chama River valley in the Andean mountains, surrounded by higher terrain in all quadrants. Night operations are prohibited. Commercial service resumed to Caracas on 1 August 2013, after being suspended for 5 years due to the crash of Santa Bárbara Airlines Flight 518.

Until 2008, it was the main airport in the state of Merida and one of the most important in the Andean region and the country, at which time new regulations limited commercial operations there.

== History and description ==
Inaugurated in 1946, this airport was located on the outskirts of the city, but the rapid urban growth during the 1960s and 1970s soon left it surrounded by houses and buildings on all four sides. Two large mountain ranges are located around it, on the south side is the Sierra Nevada with its highest peak, Pico Bolívar, at 4,978 meters (16,332 ft) above sea level.

It has an air terminal with services such as car rental, excursions to places of tourist interest, sale of air tickets, taxi line, cafeteria, restaurant and commercial shops. The airport does not have customs or beacons, so it cannot accommodate international or night flights. The entries and exits are carried out through the visual corridors "Río Chama" to the WSW, "Observatorio" to the ENE, "El Morro" to the South and "El Valle" to the North. Operations are governed by VFR flight rules as there are no radio aids nearby.

The airport has a single runway 1,630 meters (5,350 ft) long and 60 meters (200 ft) wide including the security areas.

Its infrastructure consists of an air terminal that offers car rental services, excursions to tourist sites, air ticket sales, taxi line, cafeteria, restaurant and several shops. Private flights are coordinated by BAER and INAC staff and the General Aviation ramp parking is free.

This airport is not equipped with customs, so it cannot accommodate international flights. Entrances and exits are carried out through the visual corridors Rio Chama to WSW, El Morro to the South and El Valle to the North, operations are governed by VFR flight rules because there are no radio aids nearby, nor does it have beaconing so after sunset or under conditions of poor visibility the airport is disabled and any pending flight is diverted to El Vigia at 1 hour by car.

A famous event occurred in 1985 when a Douglas DC-9-30 plane of Aeropostal, with the registration YV24C, landed in Mérida with Pope John Paul II.

After the crash of Flight 518, the only approach mode approved by the aviation authorities was the Chama River corridor.

== Airlines and destinations ==
Airlines	Destinations
Conviasa	Caracas

== Commercial aircraft that operated on the airport ==
- ATR 42
- ATR 72
- Beechcraft 1900
- Boeing 727
- Boeing 737
- Bombardier Q400
- Convair CV-240 family
- de Havilland Canada Dash 7
- Douglas DC-3
- Embraer EMB 120 Brasilia
- Fokker 50
- McDonnell Douglas DC-9

== Accidents and incidents ==
On 21 February 2008, Santa Bárbara Airlines Flight 518, an ATR 42-300 twin-turboprop en route to Caracas, crashed shortly after takeoff from Carnevalli, killing all 46 people on board. The cause of the accident was pilot error caused by disorientation and rushed procedures.

== See also ==
- Transport in Venezuela
- List of airports in Venezuela
