= Albatros Airlines (Venezuela) =

Venezuelan regional airline

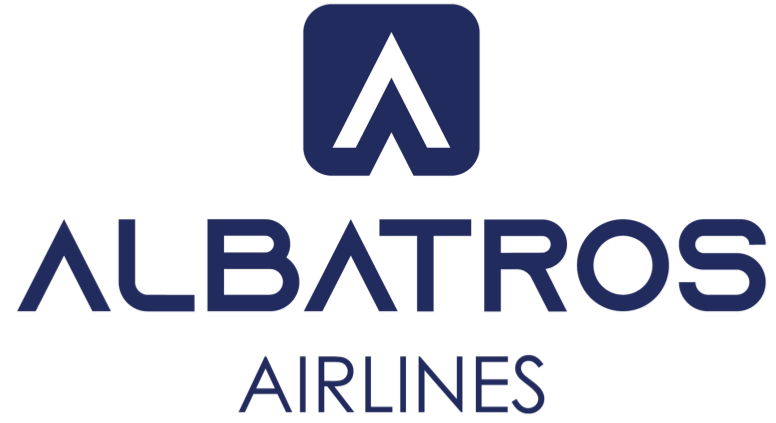

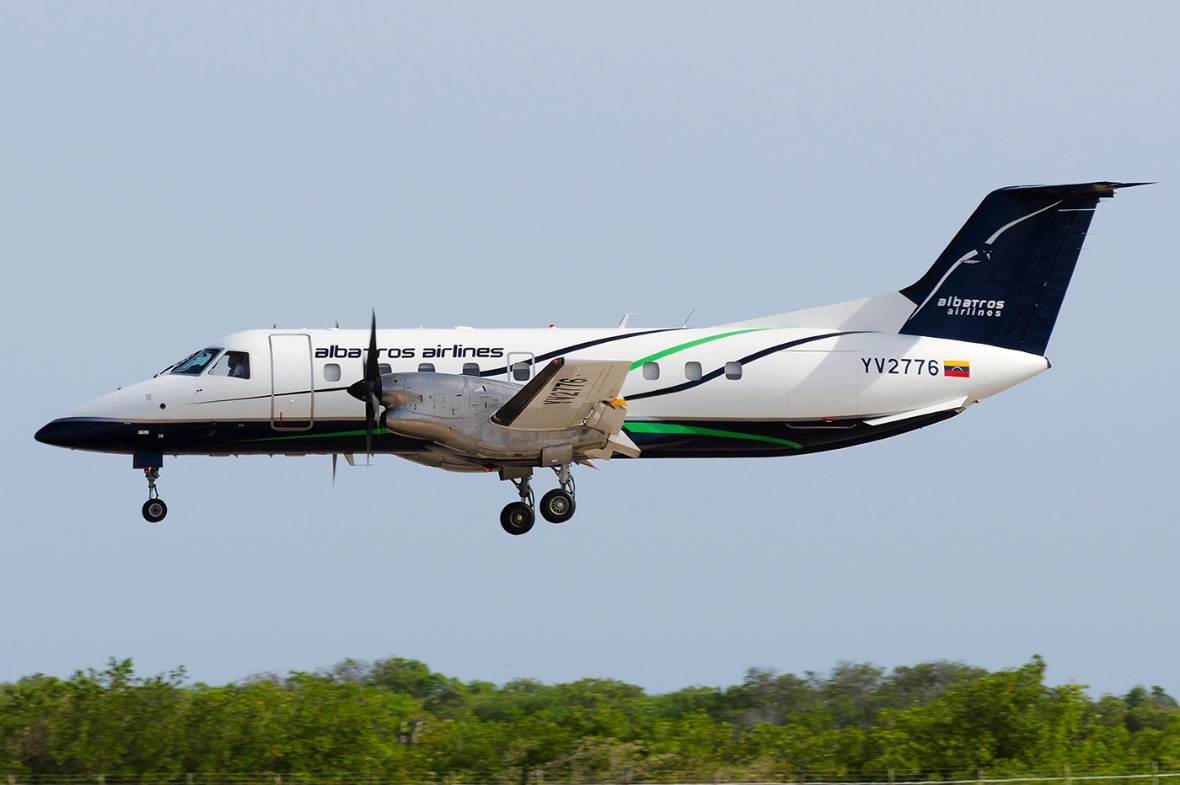
IATA	ICAO	Call sign
G0	GAL	ERRANTE
- Founded: December 27, 2007
- Commenced operations: May 20, 2010
- Operating bases: Mariscal Sucre Airport
- Headquarters: Sindoni Tower, Maracay, Venezuela
- Website: goalbatros.com

Albatros Airlines (registered as Alianza Glancelot, C.A.) is a Venezuelan charter airline with private capital, authorized to carry out flights for the transfer of passengers and cargo.

== History ==
Albatros Airlines was founded on December 27, 2007. It received its air operator's certificate on May 13, 2010, issued by the National Institute of Civil Aviation, and commercial flights began a week later to Porlamar and Carúpano.

As part of the company's expansion project, it acquired one Boeing 737-500 to increase its fleet and services. With it, it operated flights to San José, Costa Rica with two weekly frequencies, being the only direct flight between Maiquetía and San José.

On December 5, 2018, Albatros began commercial flights from Caracas to Barranquilla, on a 2-day frequency, flying non-stop direct.

On July 19, 2021, it was announced Brazilian start-up airline Nella Linhas Aéreas acquired Albatros Airlines.

After suspending operations in April 2020 due to the COVID-19 pandemic, Albatros Airlines resumed limited charter services on January 12, 2023, amid ongoing regulatory and economic challenges in Venezuela.

== Fleet ==
=== Former fleet ===
Albatros Airlines formerly operated the following aircraft:

Aircraft	Total	Introduced	Retired	Notes
Airbus A320-200	1	2019	2020	Leased from SmartLynx Airlines Estonia
Boeing 737-500	1	2015	2024	Seized in Curaçao due to unpaid debts
Embraer EMB 120 Brasilia	3	2012	2024	One damaged by an engine fire
McDonnell Douglas MD-82	1	2023	2024	Operated as Albatros by Nella

== See also ==
- List of airlines of Venezuela
