= Las Piedras, Venezuela =

Las Piedras
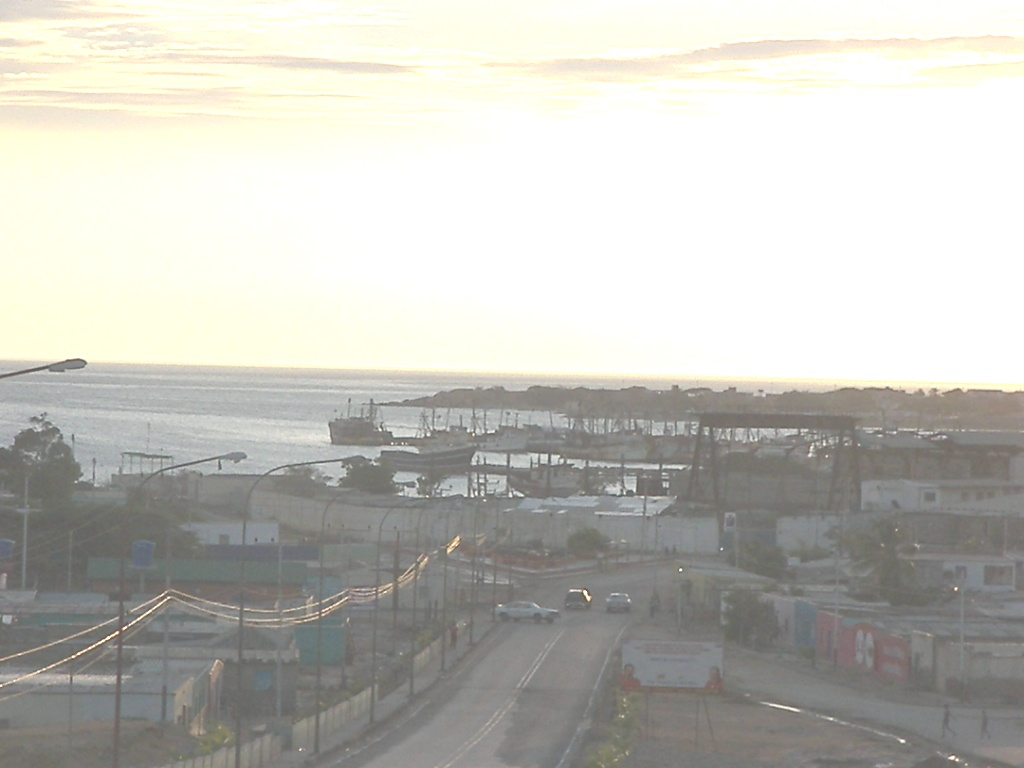
- Las Piedras

- Location within Venezuela
- Coordinates: 11°43′01″N 70°13′13″W
- country: Venezuela
- state: Falcón State

Las Piedras is a town and sea port in northwestern Venezuela, in the Punto Fijo metropolitan area.

== Transportation ==
The Punto Fijo metropolitan area is served by Josefa Camejo International Airport, with a number of commercial airlines flying there from Caracas and from Cuba and, formerly, from Aruba. Las Piedras also has a sea port.
