= Josefa Camejo International Airport =

Airport in Venezuela

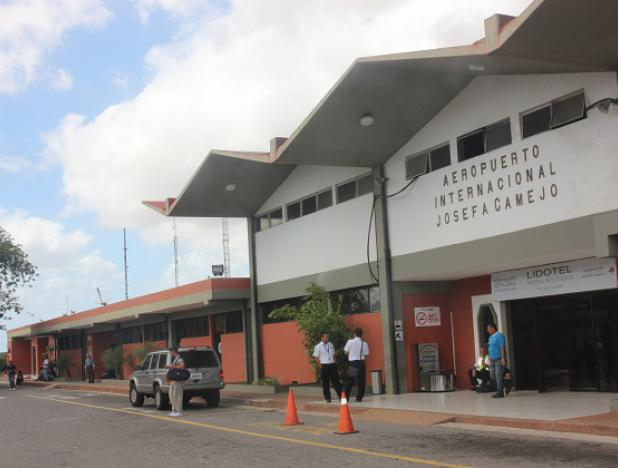
- IATA: LSP; ICAO: SVJC

Summary
- Airport type: Public
- Serves: Punto Fijo
- Location: Los Taques Municipality, Venezuela
- Elevation AMSL: 92 ft / 28 m
- Coordinates: 11°46′50″N 70°09′00″W

Map
- Location of airport in Venezuela

Runways
Direction	Length		Surface
Direction	m	ft	Surface
09/27	2,800	9,186	Asphalt
- Sources: GCM

Josefa Camejo International Airport (IATA: LSP, ICAO: SVJC) is an airport serving the Paraguaná Peninsula in Venezuela. The airport is named after Josefa Camejo, a heroine of the Venezuelan War of Independence.

On May 22, 2018, Aruba Airlines inaugurated what, according to Travel and Leisure Magazine was the world's shortest international flight. linking the airport with Aruba Airline's hub in Oranjestad, a flight that lasted approximately eight minutes each way.

== Airlines and destinations ==
Airlines	Destinations
Avior Airlines	Caracas
Albatros Airlines	Charter: Curaçao
Conviasa	Caracas
Venezolana	Caracas

== Accidents and incidents ==
- On 5 December 2011, a flight to Aruba by the company Tiara Air departing from Josefa Camejo International Airport was on the runway going at full speed to depart when a donkey appeared on the runway. The aircraft, a Shorts 360, hit the donkey with the right main gear; the pilots kept climbing and continued the flight to Aruba for an emergency landing, which was performed safely with no injury on board.

== See also ==
- Transport in Venezuela
- List of airports in Venezuela
