= Queen Beatrix International Airport =

Airport in Oranjestad, Aruba

Queen Beatrix International Airport Internationale luchthaven Koningin Beatrix Aeropuerto Internacional Reina Beatrix
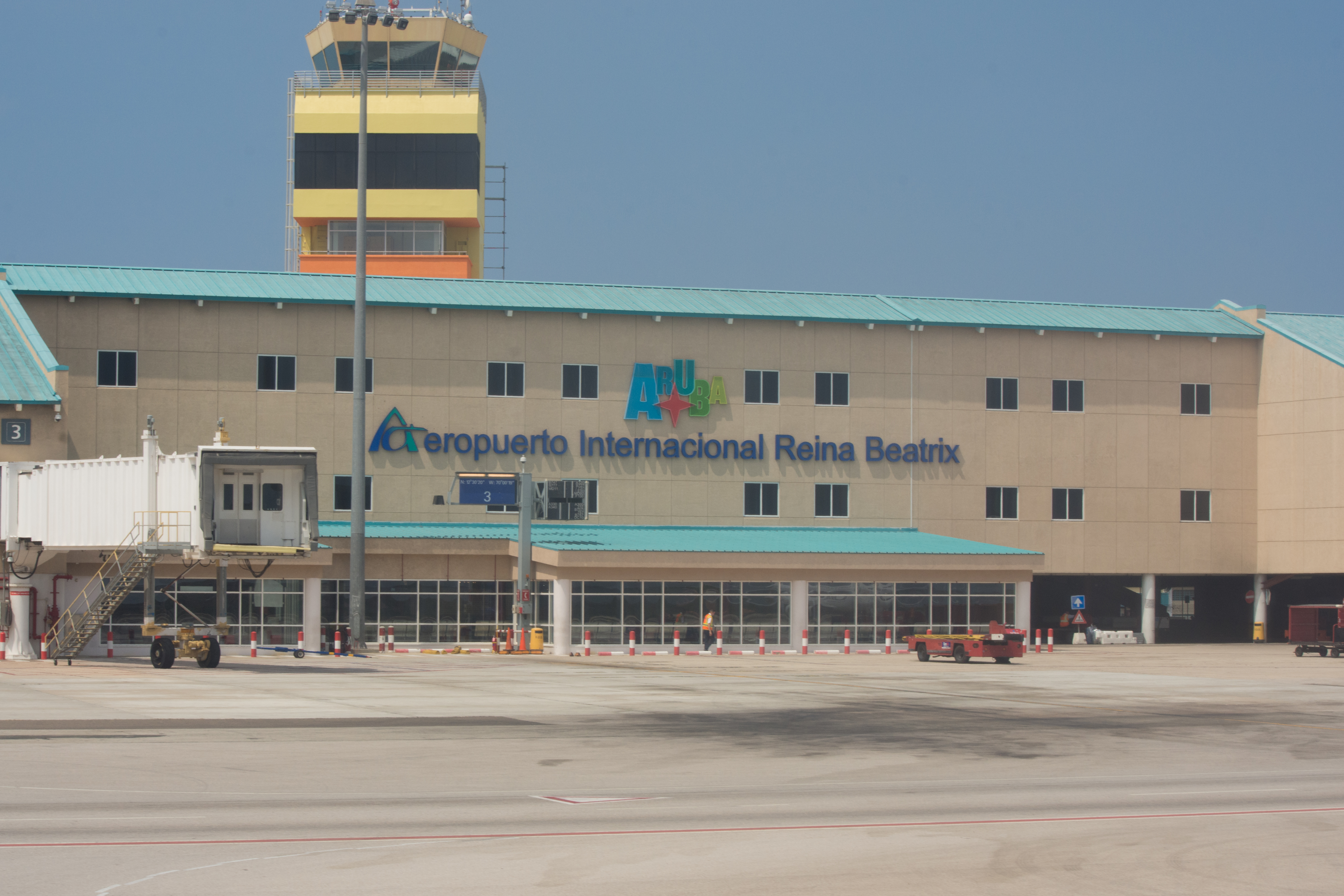
- IATA: AUA; ICAO: TNCA

Summary
- Airport type: Public
- Owner: Aruba Airport Authority N.V.
- Location: Oranjestad, Aruba
- Hub for: Aruba Airlines
- Focus city for: Aerosucre
- Elevation AMSL: 60 ft (18 m)
- Coordinates: 12°30′05″N 70°00′55″W
- Website: airportaruba.com

Map
- Location in Aruba

Runways
Direction	Length		Surface
Direction	m	ft	Surface
11/29	2,808	9,213	Asphalt
- Source: Aruba Airport

Queen Beatrix International Airport (IATA: AUA, ICAO: TNCA) (Dutch: Internationale luchthaven Koningin Beatrix; Papiamento: Aeropuerto Internacional Reina Beatrix) is an international airport located in the Dutch Caribbean island of Aruba. It has flight services to the United States, Canada, several countries in the Caribbean, the northern coastal countries of South America, as well as some parts of Europe, notably the Netherlands. It is named after Beatrix of the Netherlands, who reigned as Queen of the Netherlands from 1980 to 2013.

== Overview ==
The airport offers United States border preclearance facilities.

The airport originally served as main hub for Air Aruba until its bankruptcy in 2000. Before Aruba's separation from the Netherlands Antilles in 1986 it was also one of three hubs for ALM Antillean Airlines as well as home base for Tiara Air until 2016.

A terminal for private aircraft opened in 2007.

Since 2013 the airport is home to Aruba Airlines. The airline has three Airbus A320 family aircraft and two Bombardier CRJ200. The main focus of Aruba Airlines is connecting the region through its hub.

== History ==
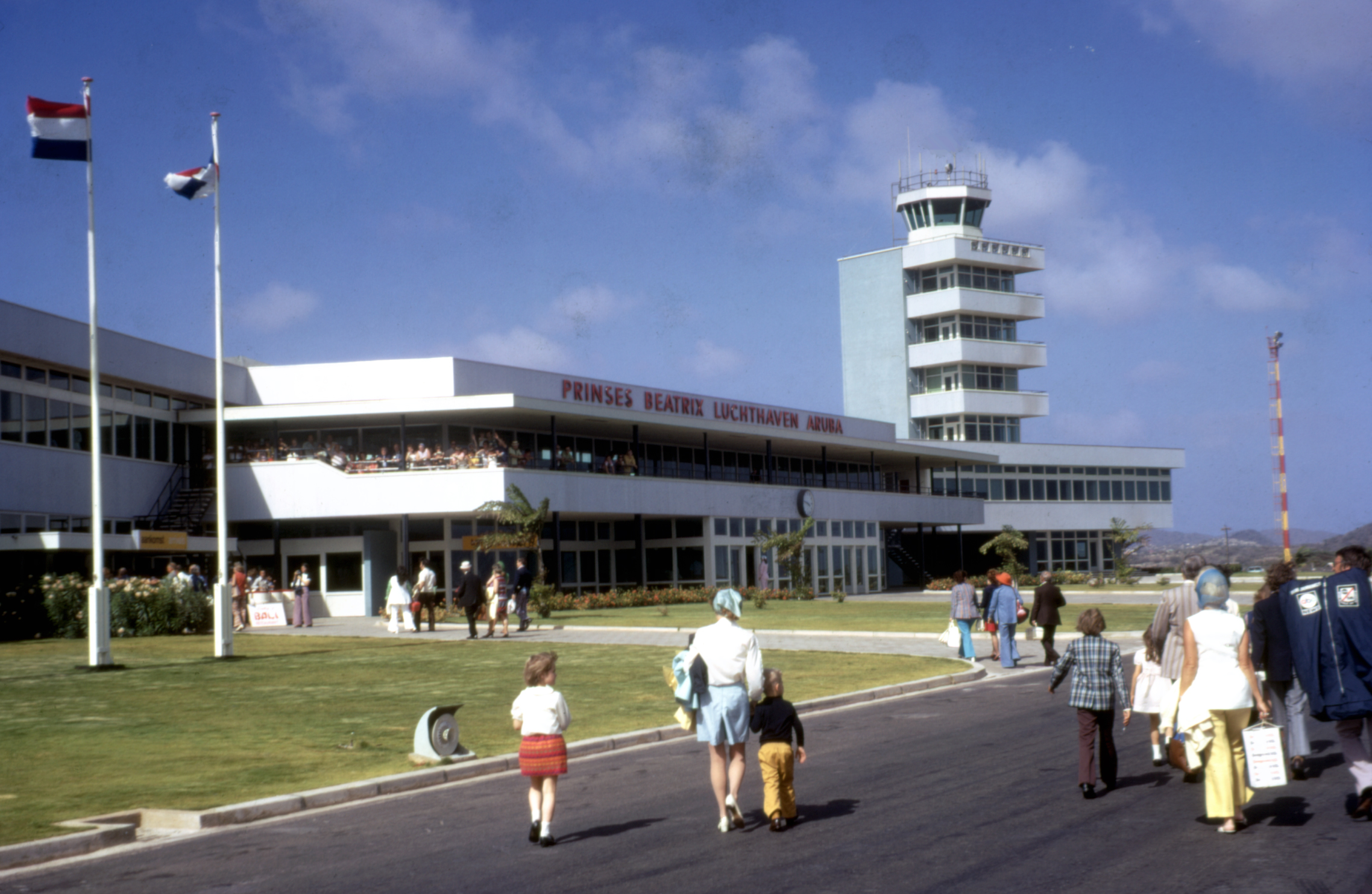
The airport in 1973

In 1934, Manuel Viana launched a weekly mail and passenger service between Aruba and Curaçao, with A.J. Viccellio piloting Loening C-2H Air Yacht PJ-ZAA from a mud-flat runway. Commercial services were taken over by KLM from 24 December 1934. Later they were transferred to a graded runway known as the KLM field. KLM's Snip, the PJ-AIS a Fokker tri-motor, ushered in the scheduled flying age in Aruba on 19 January 1935. Together with the KLM's "Oriol", the PJ-AIO, also a three-engine Fokker, they flew until 1946, after which they were scrapped. On its bi-weekly Aruba-Curaçao operations, KLM transported 2,695 passengers on 471 flights.

During World War II, the airport was used by the United States Army Air Forces Sixth Air Force defending Caribbean shipping and the Panama Canal against German submarines. The airfield was renamed Dakota Field; the terminal facilities became Dakota Airport. Flying units assigned to the airfield were:

- 59th Bombardment Squadron (9th Bombardment Group) 14 January-24 September 1942 (A-20 Havoc)
- 12th Bombardment Squadron (25th Bombardment Group) 10 October 1942 – 23 November 1943 (B-18 Bolo)
- 22d Fighter Squadron (36th Fighter Group) 2 September 1942 – April 1943 (P-40 Warhawk)
- 32d Fighter Squadron (Antilles Air Command) 9 March 1943 – March 1944 (P-40 Warhawk)

On 22 October 1955, the airport was named after Princess Beatrix of the Netherlands during a royal visit. It was renamed in 1980 after her accession to the throne.

On 3 March 2021, American Airlines celebrated its 50 years flying to and from Aruba.

As part of Phase 1A of Gateway 2030, a massive airport expansion project, the airport built a new U.S. Check-In Terminal with sufficiently advanced baggage handling equipment, thereby relieving U.S.-bound passengers of the burden of reclaiming baggage and undergoing another screening. The first flights began from the new terminal on April 8, 2025.

== Airlines and destinations ==
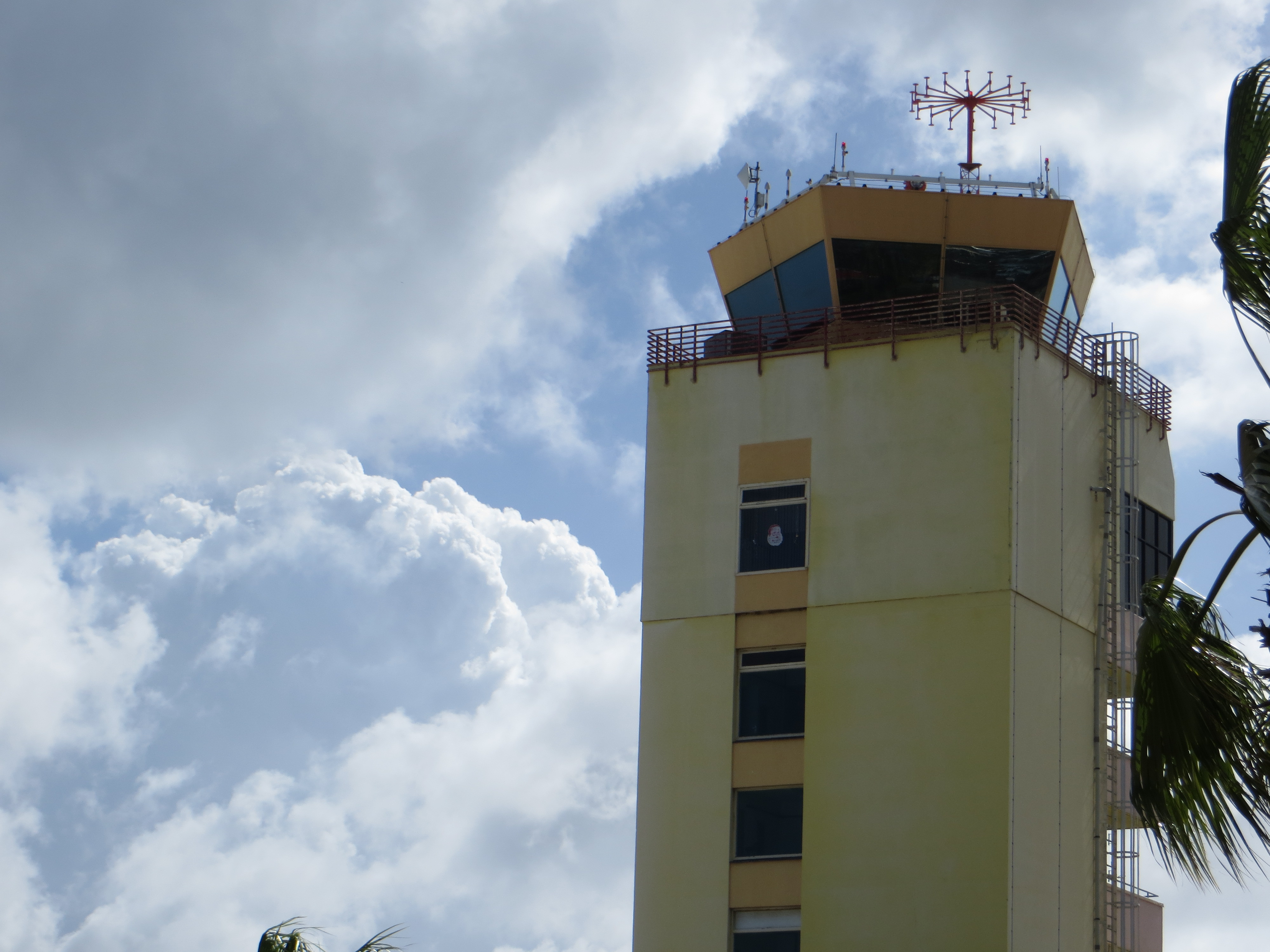
The air traffic control tower

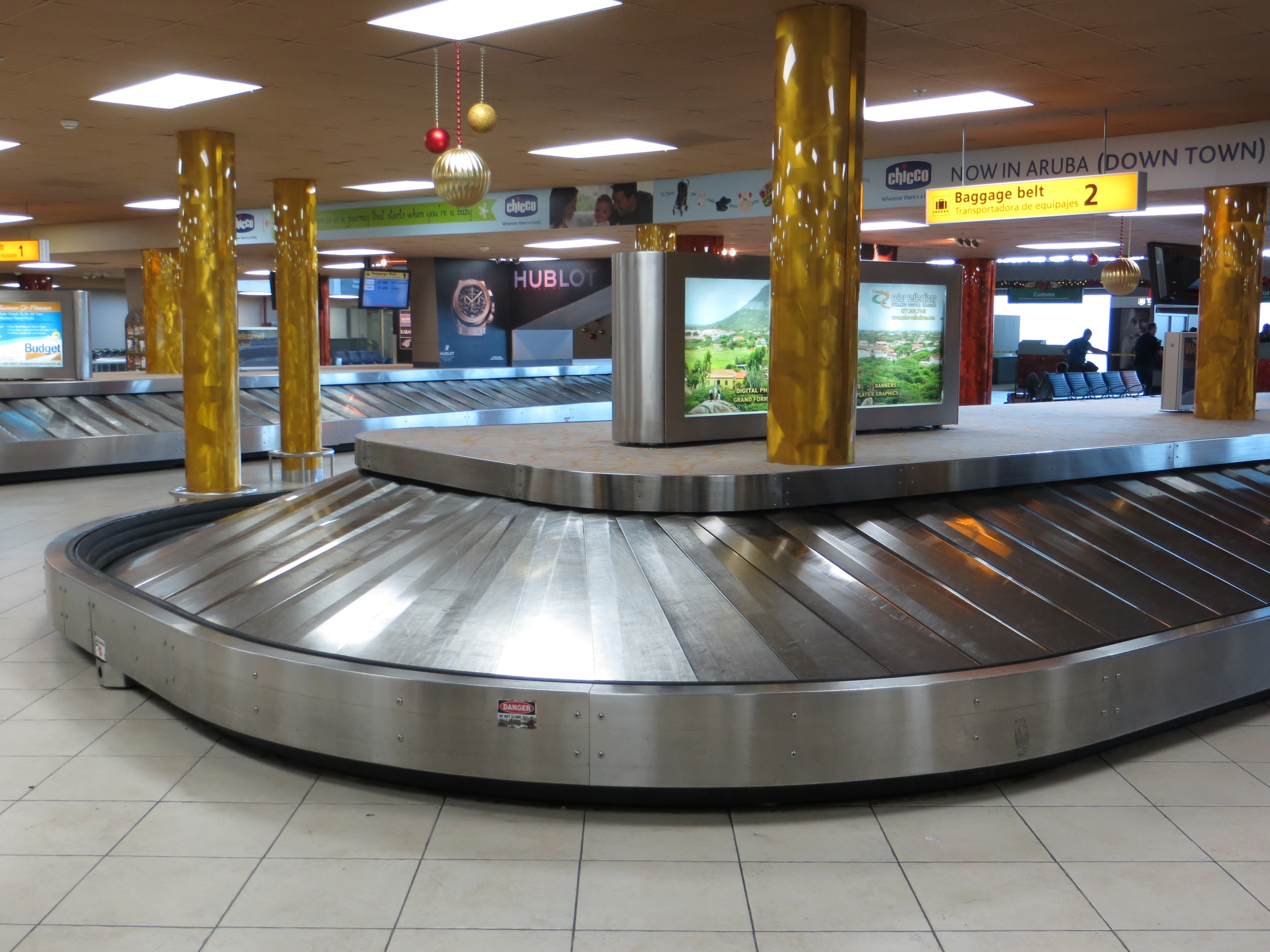
The baggage claim area

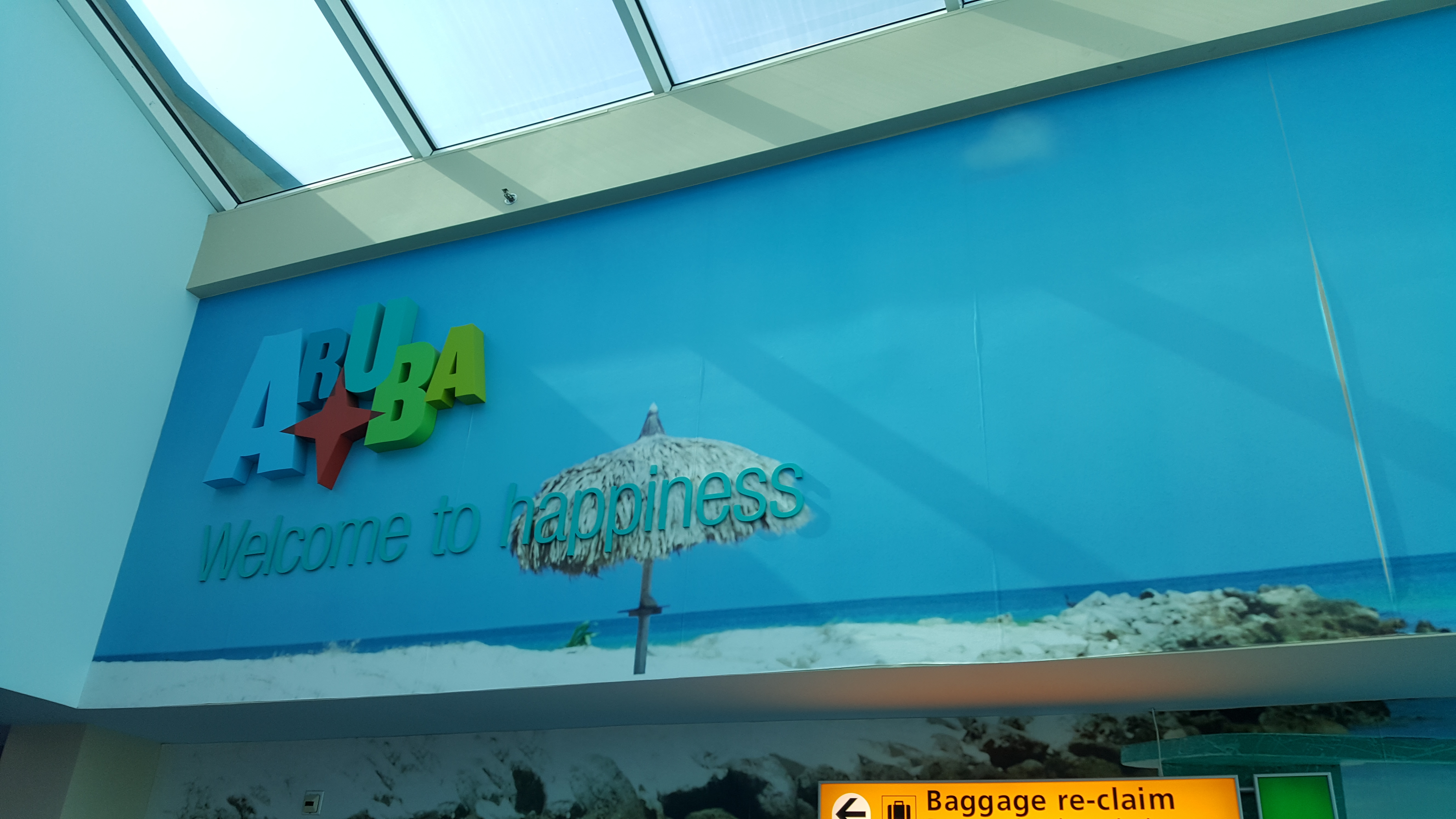
Welcome sign

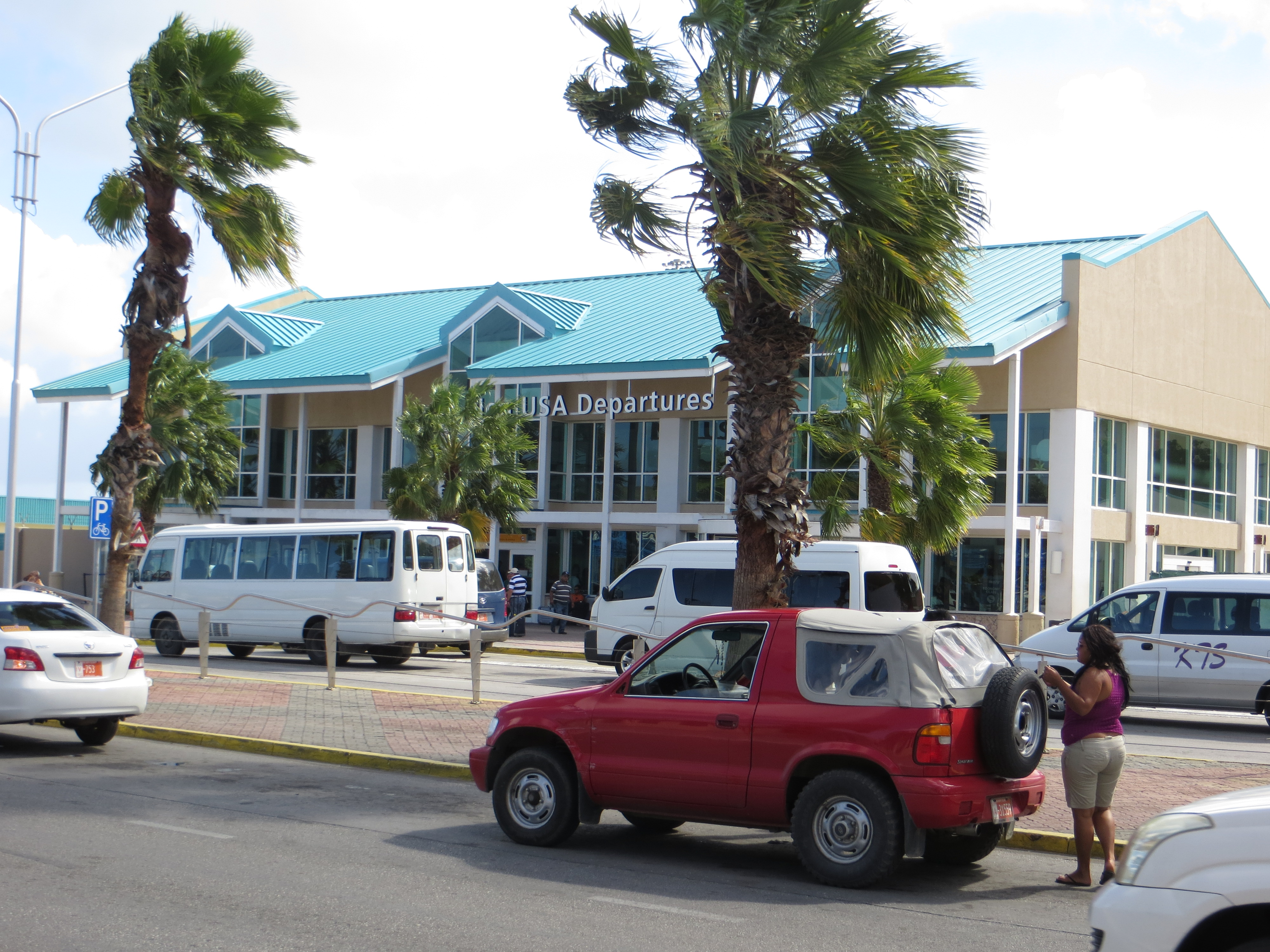
The non-USA departures building

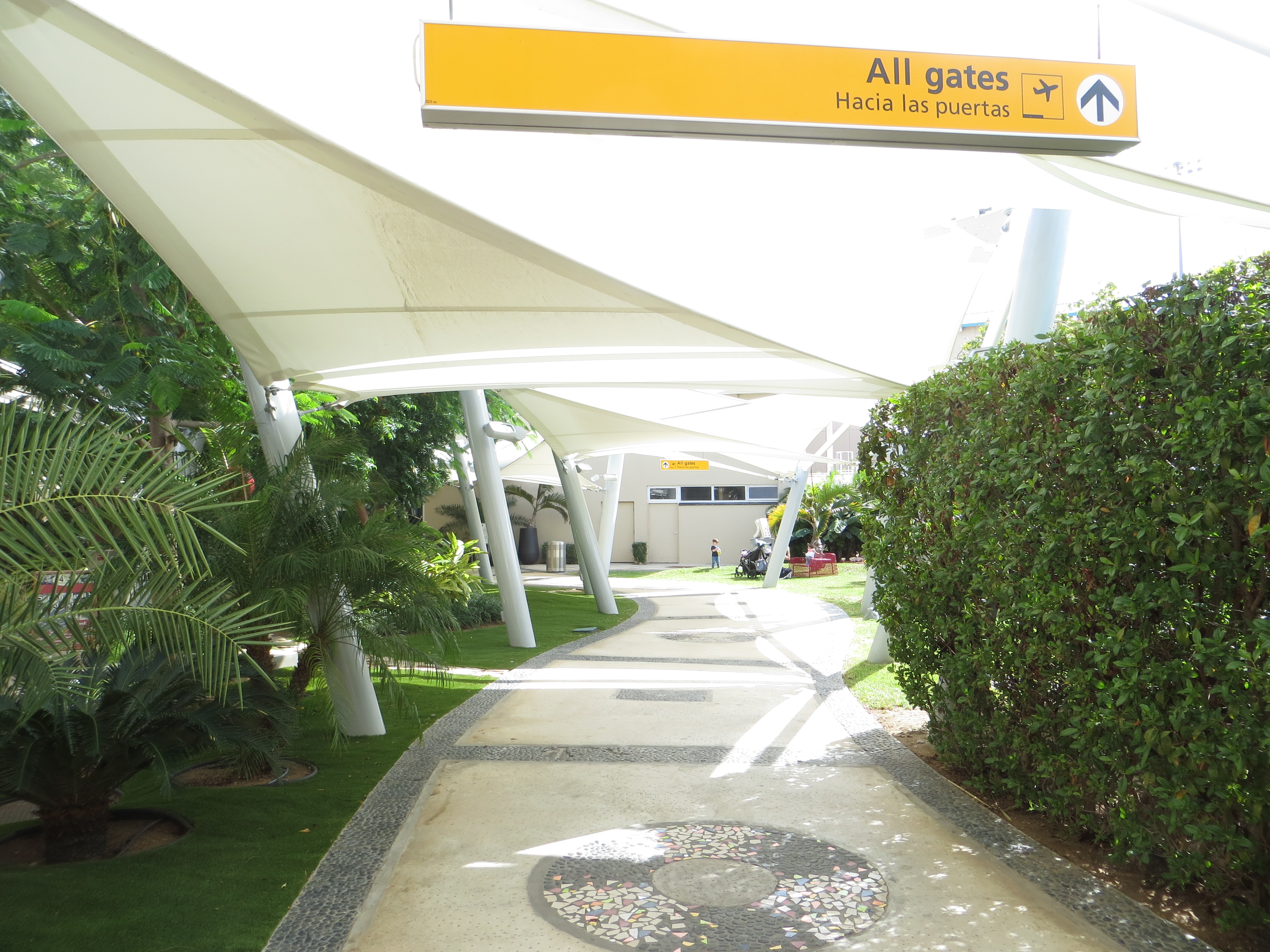
Walkway to security and US pre-clearance facilities

=== Passenger ===
Airlines	Destinations
Aerolíneas Argentinas	Buenos Aires–Ezeiza; Seasonal: Córdoba (AR), Mendoza
Air Canada	Seasonal: Montréal–Trudeau (begins 6 December 2026)
Air Canada Rouge	Toronto–Pearson
Air Century	Santo Domingo–La Isabela
Air Transat	Seasonal: Montréal–Trudeau (begins 12 December 2026)
American Airlines	Charlotte, Miami, Philadelphia; Seasonal: Chicago–O'Hare, Dallas/Fort Worth, New York–LaGuardia
Arajet	Santo Domingo–Las Américas
Avianca	Bogotá
Avianca Ecuador	Bogotá
Copa Airlines	Panama City–Tocumen
Delta Air Lines	Atlanta, New York–JFK; Seasonal: Boston, Detroit (begins 19 December 2026), Minneapolis/St. Paul
Divi Divi Air	Curaçao
JetBlue	Boston, Fort Lauderdale, New York–JFK
KLM	Amsterdam, Bonaire
LATAM Colombia	Seasonal: Bogotá
LATAM Perú	Lima
Porter Airlines	Seasonal: Ottawa, Toronto–Pearson
Southwest Airlines	Baltimore, Orlando; Seasonal: Nashville (begins 13 March 2027)
Sun Country Airlines	Seasonal: Minneapolis/St. Paul
Surinam Airways	Curaçao, Paramaribo
TUI fly Netherlands	Amsterdam
United Airlines	Chicago–O'Hare, Houston–Intercontinental, Newark, Washington–Dulles
WestJet	Toronto–Pearson
Winair	Curaçao, Sint Maarten
Wingo	Barranquilla, Bogotá, Medellín–JMC; Seasonal: Bucaramanga, Cali
Z Air	Bonaire, Curaçao

Notes

- ^1 KLM's flights operate to and from Bonaire on selected days.
- ^2 TUI Airlines Netherlands' flights operate between Aruba, Bonaire and Curaçao on selected days. However, the airline does not have fifth freedom rights to transport passengers solely between Aruba, Bonaire and Curaçao.
- ^3 Winair's flights operate between Aruba and Sint Maarten via Curaçao on selected days.

== Statistics ==
Busiest US routes from Aruba (2009–2010)
Rank	Airport	Passengers	Carriers
1	New York–JFK, New York	237,498	Delta, JetBlue
2	Miami, Florida	209,364	American
3	Newark, New Jersey	145,448	JetBlue, Continental/United
4	Atlanta, Georgia	139,547	Delta
5	Charlotte, North Carolina	120,362	US Airways/American
6	Boston, MA	113,910	JetBlue, Delta
7	Philadelphia, PA	67,993	US Airways/American
8	Washington–Dulles, VA	27,477	United
9	Chicago–O'Hare, Illinois	18,362	United, US Airways/American
10	Houston–Intercontinental, TX	15,727	Continental/United

== Accidents and incidents ==
- On 13 January 2010, an Arkefly Boeing 767-300 (registration PH-AHQ), operating Flight 361 from Amsterdam Schiphol Airport to Queen Beatrix International Airport, declared an emergency after a man claimed to have a bomb on board. A struggle with the flight crew ensued, and the aircraft made an emergency landing at Shannon Airport, Ireland. Gardaí stormed the plane and arrested the man; he was taken to Shannon Garda station. A passenger who had recently had surgery collapsed in the terminal while waiting for the continuation of the flight, and had to be taken to a local hospital. The replacement aircraft, PH-AHY, also a Boeing 767-300, continued the flight to Aruba.

== See also ==
- Trams in Oranjestad
