= Water landing =

Aircraft landing on a body of water

External videos
- Ditching of a B-24D into the James River in 1944 – Flight
- Ditching of a B-24D into the James River in 1944 – Preparations
- Ditching Procedures for a C-54

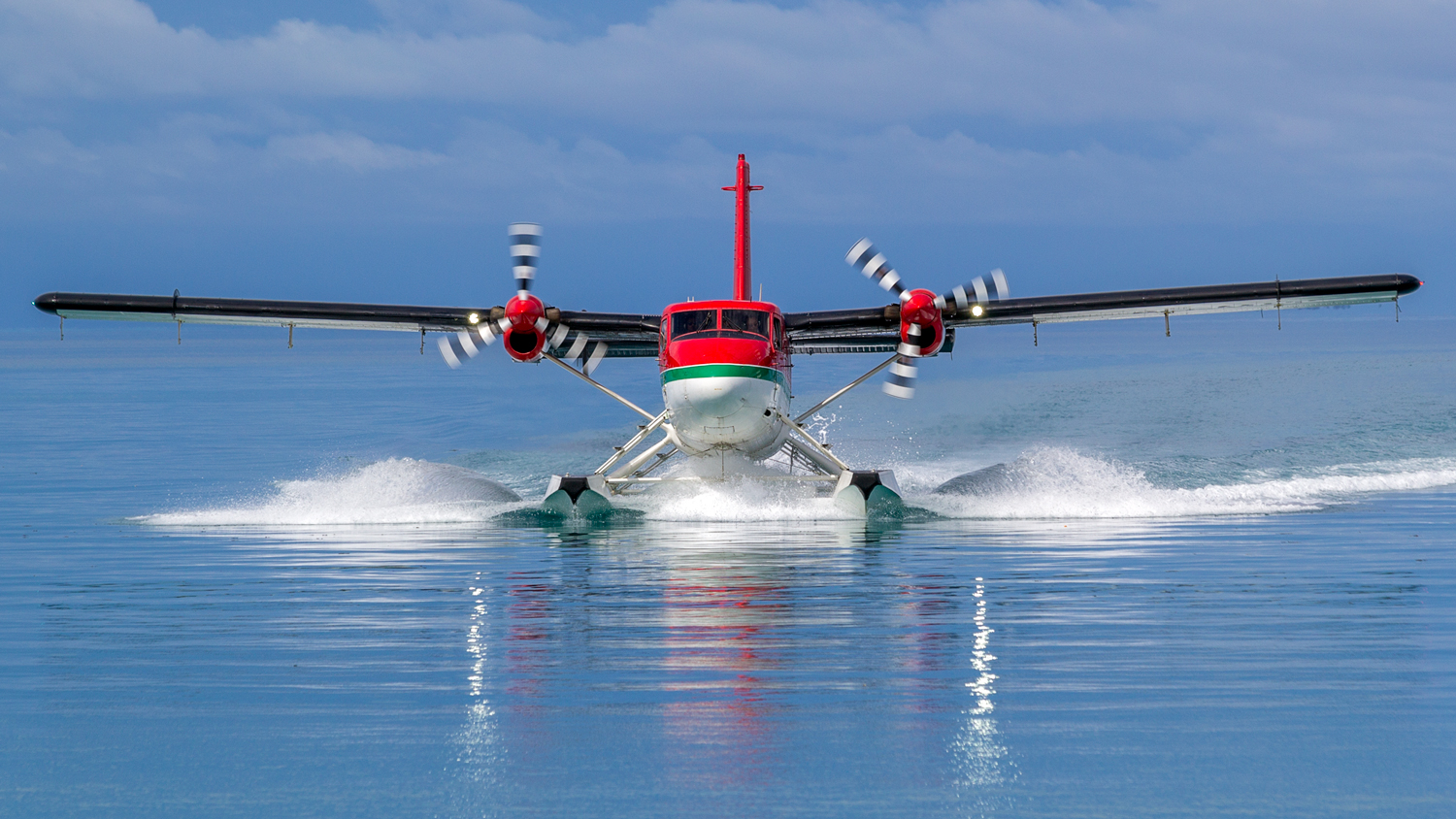
A Twin Otter float plane completing a water landing

In aviation, a water landing is, in the broadest sense, an aircraft landing on a body of water. Seaplanes, such as floatplanes and flying boats, land on water as a normal operation. Ditching is a controlled emergency landing on the water surface in an aircraft not designed for the purpose, and it is a very rare occurrence. Controlled flight into the surface and uncontrolled flight ending in a body of water (including a runway excursion into water) are generally not considered water landings or ditching, but are considered accidents. Most times, ditching results in aircraft structural failure.

== Aircraft water landings ==
=== By design ===
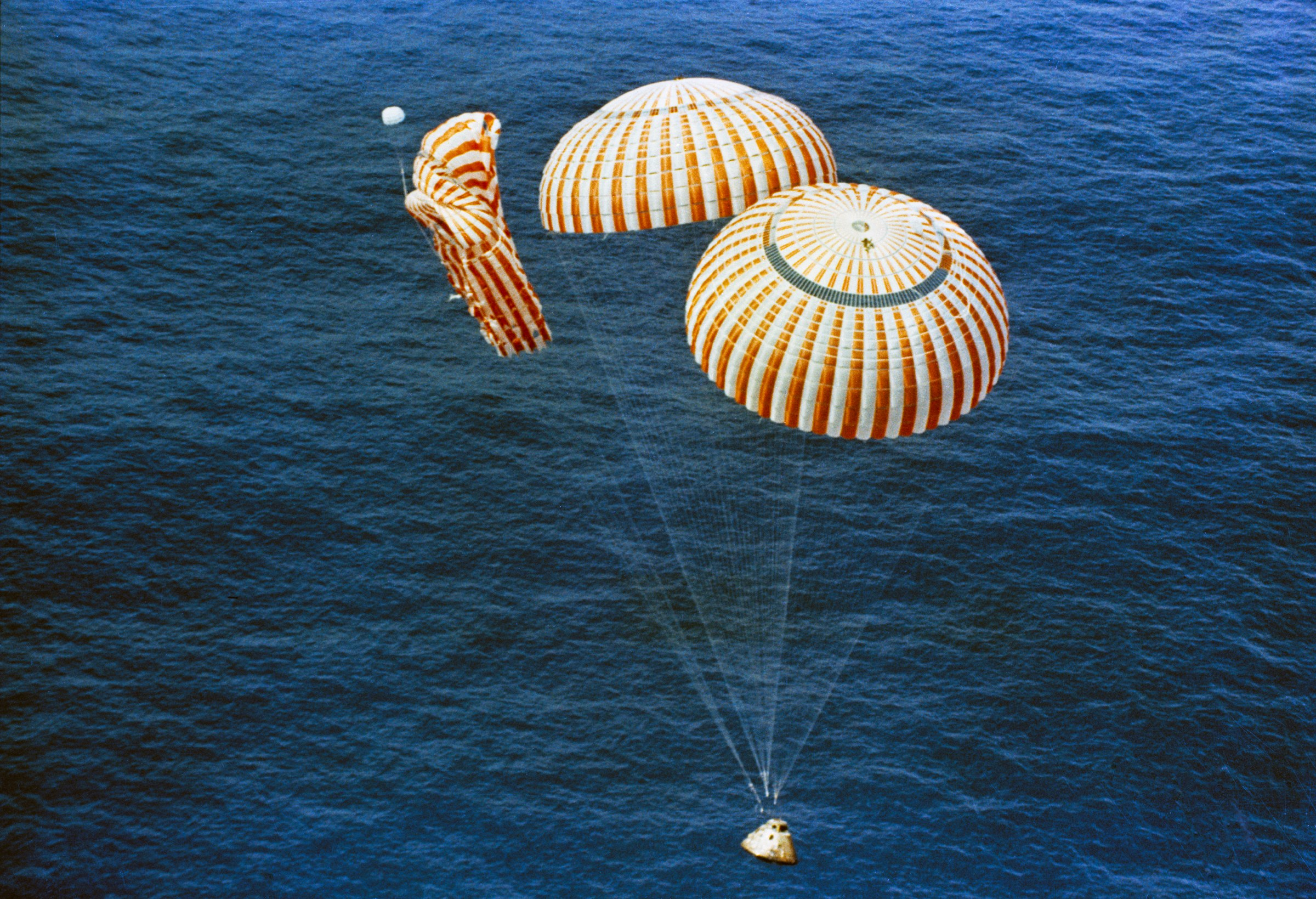
The Apollo 15 capsule descends under two of three parachutes.

Seaplanes, flying boats, and amphibious aircraft are designed to take off and land on water. Water-landing can be supported by a hull-shaped fuselage and/or pontoons. The availability of a long effective runway was historically important on lifting size restrictions on aircraft, and their freedom from constructed strips remains useful for transportation to lakes and other remote areas. The ability to loiter on water is also important for marine rescue operations and fire fighting. One disadvantage of water alighting is that it is dangerous in the presence of waves. Furthermore, the necessary equipment compromises the craft's aerodynamic efficiency and speed.

==== Spacecraft ====
Early crewed spacecraft launched by the United States were designed to alight on water by the splashdown method. The craft would parachute into the water, which acted as a cushion to bring the craft to a stop. Alighting over water rather than land made braking rockets unnecessary, but its disadvantages included difficult retrieval and the danger of drowning. The NASA Space Shuttle design was intended to land on a runway instead. The SpaceX Dragon uses water landings, and has carried crew since 2020.

=== In distress ===
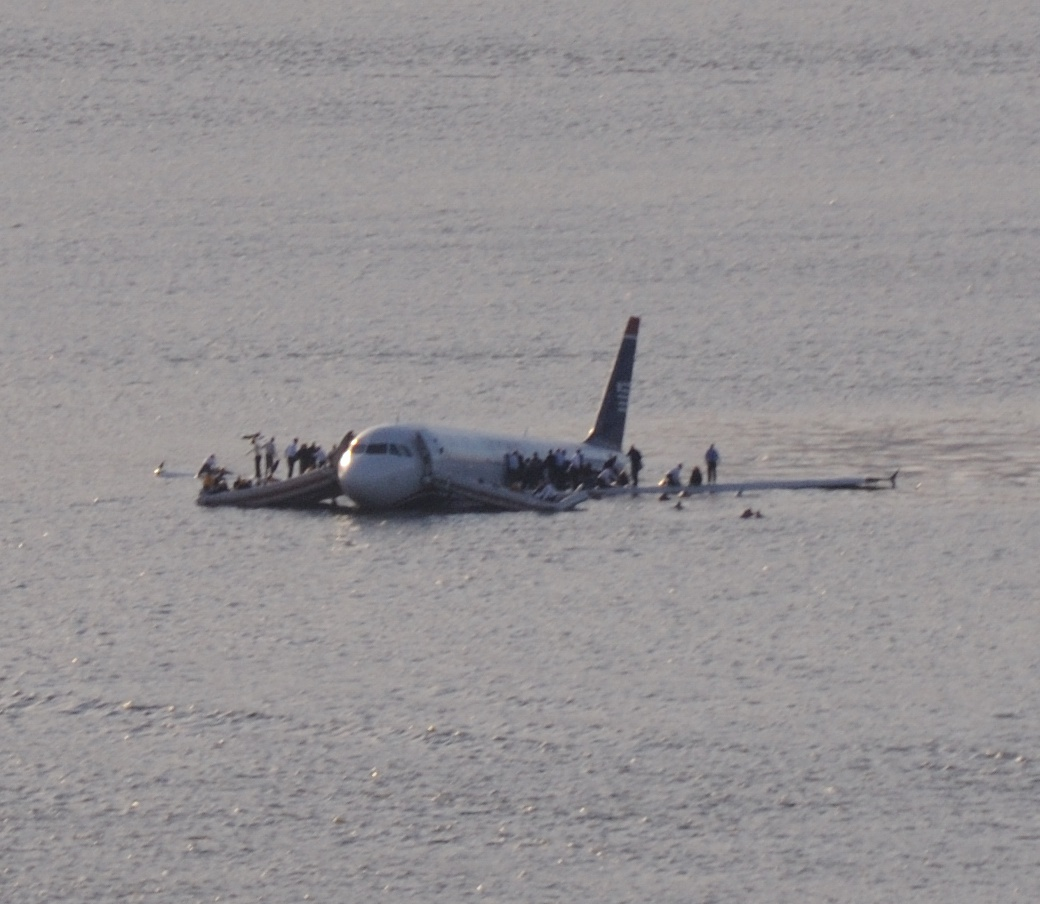
US Airways Flight 1549 ditched on the Hudson River in 2009 with all passengers surviving.

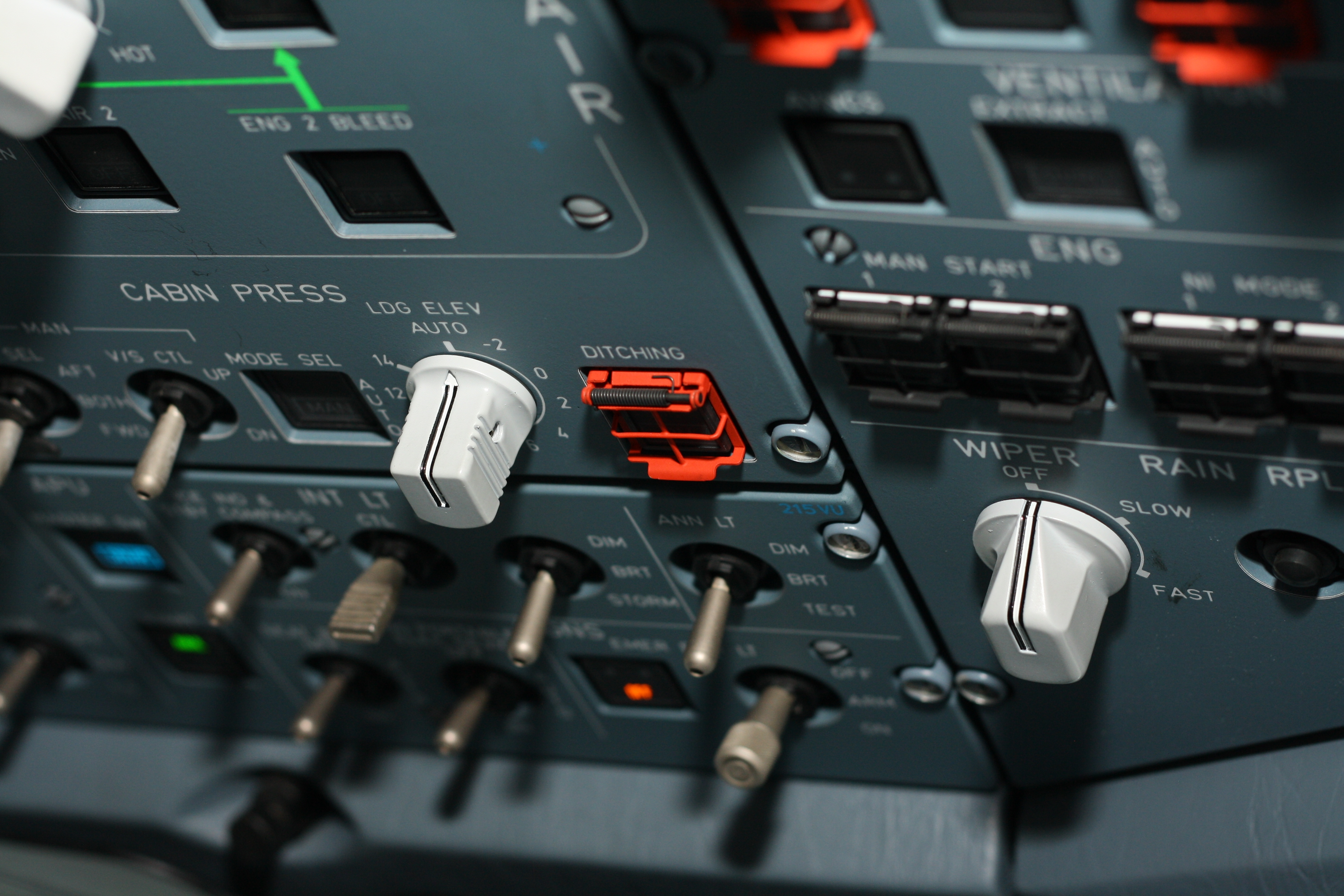
Ditching button on the overhead panel of an Airbus A330

While ditching is extremely uncommon in commercial passenger travel, small aircraft tend to ditch slightly more often because they usually have only one engine and their systems have fewer redundancies. According to the National Transportation Safety Board, there are about a dozen ditchings per year. Reasons for ditching vary, but the most common are engine failure, flat spin, and pilot error.

==== General aviation ====
General aviation includes all fields of aviation outside of military or scheduled (commercial) flights. This classification includes small aircraft, e.g., training aircraft, airships, gliders, helicopters, and corporate aircraft, including business jets and other for-hire operations. General aviation has the highest accident and incident rate in aviation, with 16 deaths per million flight hours, compared to 0.74 deaths per million flight hours for commercial flights (North America and Europe).

==== Commercial aircraft ====
In the United States, the FAA does not require commercial pilots to train to ditch but airline cabin personnel must train on the evacuation process. In addition, the FAA implemented rules under which circumstances (kind of operator, number of passengers, weight, route) an aircraft has to carry emergency equipment including floating devices such as life jackets and life rafts.

Some aircraft are designed with the possibility of a water landing in mind. Airbus aircraft, for example, feature a "ditching button" which, if pressed, closes valves and openings underneath the aircraft, including the outflow valve, the air inlet for the emergency RAT, the avionics inlet, the extract valve, and the flow control valve. It is meant to slow flooding in a water landing.

==== Airplane water ditchings ====
| Date | Aircraft | Occupants | Fatalities | Details |
|---|---|---|---|---|
| 13 January 1923 | Aeromarine 75 | 9 | 4 | An Aeromarine Airways Aeromarine 75 ditched into the Atlantic Ocean when the flying boat suffered engine issues. 5 of the 9 people on board survived. |
| 21 October 1926 | Handley Page W.10 | 12 | 0 | An Imperial Airways Handley Page W.10 (G-EBMS) ditched into the English Channel after suffering an engine failure. All 12 people on board survived. |
| 17 June 1929 | Handley Page W.10 | 13 | 7 | An Imperial Airways Handley Page W.10 (G-EBMT) ditched into the English Channel after suffering an engine failure. 6 of the 13 people on board the plane survived. |
| 21 January 1939 | Short S.23 Empire | 13 | 3 | An Imperial Airways Short S.23 Empire (G-ADUU) ditched into the Atlantic Ocean after suffering a loss of power to its engines. 10 of the 13 people on board survived. |
| 10 February 1945 | Douglas C-47 | 12 | 0 | A lost U.S. Air Force Douglas C-47 was attempting to make an emergency landing at a nearby airfield since it was running on low fuel. Unbeknownst to the crew, they were heading towards a Japanese airfield. A P-51, piloted by Louis Edward Curdes, conducting an air attack over the Japanese airfield spotted the C-47. He was unable to contact the crew of the C-47 as the radio on the C-47 had stopped working, so he shot down both engines of the C-47 to prevent the occupants of the C-47 from being captured by the Japanese upon landing at the airfield. The C-47 was then forced to ditch into the sea. All 12 people on board survived and were eventually rescued. |
| 11 April 1952 | Douglas DC-4 | 69 | 52 | Pan Am Flight 526A ditched 11.3 miles northwest of Puerto Rico due to engine failure after takeoff. Many survived the initial ditching but panicking passengers refused to leave the sinking wreck and drowned. 52 passengers were killed, and 17 passengers and crew members were rescued by the USCG. After the accident, the Civil Aeronautics Board recommended that pre-flight safety demonstrations be conducted during over-water flights. |
| 16 April 1952 | de Havilland Australia DHA-3 Drover | 3 | 0 | A de Havilland Australia DHA-3 Drover VH-DHA operated by the Australian Department of Civil Aviation with 3 occupants ditched in the Bismarck Sea between Wewak and Manus Island. The port propeller failed, a propeller blade penetrated the fuselage and the single pilot was rendered unconscious; a passenger performed the ditching. All 3 occupants survived. |
| 3 August 1953 | Lockheed L-749A Constellation | 42 | 4 | Air France Flight 152, a Lockheed L-749A Constellation, ditched into the Mediterranean Sea (1.5 miles offshore, and 6 miles from Fethiye Point, Turkey) on a flight between Rome, Italy and Beirut, Lebanon. The propeller had failed due to blade fracture. Due to violent vibrations, engine number three broke away and control of engine number four was lost. The crew of eight and all but 4 of the 34 passengers were rescued; the other 4 passengers died. |
| 8 May 1954 | Antonov An-2 | 5 | 0 | After mistakenly enabling reverse thrust, an Antonov An-2 registered CCCP-N140 sank after attempting to land on a chunk of floating ice. No occupants were injured and they were rescued by another aircraft. |
| 19 June 1954 | Convair CV-240 HB-IRW | 9 | 3 | Swissair Convair CV-240 (HB-IRW) ditched into the English Channel because of fuel starvation, which was attributed to pilot error. All three crew and five passengers survived the ditching and could escape the plane. However, three of the passengers could not swim and eventually drowned, because there were no life jackets on board, which was not prescribed at the time. |
| 23 July 1954 | Douglas C-54A-10-DC Skymaster | 18 | 10 | Cathay Pacific VR-HEU ditched into the South China Sea after being shot by two Lavochkin La-11 fighters of the 85th Fighter Regiment, People's Liberation Army Air Force (PLAAF). While ten passengers and crew were killed by bullets and the subsequent ditching, eight others survived and escaped from the sinking plane, including both pilots. |
| 26 March 1955 | Boeing 377 Stratocruiser | 23 | 4 | Pan Am Flight 845/26 ditched 35 miles from the Oregon coast after an engine tore loose. Despite the tail section breaking off during the impact the aircraft floated for twenty minutes before sinking. 4 died but 19 survivors were rescued after a further 90 minutes in the water. |
| 2 April 1956 | Boeing 377 | 38 | 5 | Northwest Orient Airlines Flight 2 (a Boeing 377) ditched into Puget Sound after severe buffeting and altitude loss that was later determined to have been caused by the failure of the crew to close the cowl flaps on the plane's engines. All aboard escaped the aircraft after a textbook landing, but four passengers and one flight attendant succumbed either to drowning or to hypothermia before being rescued. |
| 16 October 1956 | Boeing 377 | 31 | 0 | Pan Am Flight 6 (a Boeing 377) ditched northeast of Hawaii, after losing two of its four engines. The aircraft circled around USCGC Pontchartrain until daybreak, when it ditched; all 31 on board survived. |
| 14 July 1960 | DC-7C | 57 | 1 | Northwest Orient Airlines Flight 1-11 (a DC-7C) with 7 crew and 51 passengers made a successful ditching in shark-infested waters 11 miles from Magdalo Barrio, Polillo Island, about 80 miles from Manila, Philippines. Capt. David Hall was forced to make an emergency water landing after a fire broke out in the number 2 engine when it did not feather followed by its propeller spinning off. In darkness and rough seas, the crew were able to evacuate all passengers and get them aboard the life rafts as the aircraft sank nose-first into the Pacific Ocean. There was only 1 loss of life, caused by a heart attack. The 57 passengers and crew were rescued five hours later by Coast Guard Grumman amphibian and a US Navy PBM from Sangley Point Naval Base in Cavite, Philippines. |
| 23 September 1962 | Lockheed 1049H-82 Super Constellation | 76 | 28 | Flying Tiger Line Flight 923, a Lockheed 1049H-82 Super Constellation registered as N6923C, was a passenger aircraft on a military (MATS) charter flight, with a crew of 8 and 68 U.S. civilian and military (paratrooper) passengers. It ditched in the North Atlantic about 500 miles west of Shannon, Ireland, after losing three engines on a flight from Gander, Newfoundland, to Frankfurt, West Germany. All occupants evacuated the airplane; 45 of the passengers and 3 crew were rescued, but 23 passengers and 5 crew members were lost in the storm-swept seas. |
| 22 October 1962 | DC-7C | 58 | 0 | Northwest Airlines Flight 293, a DC-7C with 7 crew and 95 passengers, made a successful water landing in Sitka Sound. The military charter flight was en route to Elmendorf Air Force Base from McChord Air Force Base. Prior to the ditching, the crew struggled with a propeller problem for about 45 minutes. The plane stayed afloat for 24 minutes after coming to rest in the water, allowing the occupants to evacuate into life-rafts. Only 6 minor injuries were reported; all passengers and crew were quickly rescued by U.S. Coast Guard ships. The accident report called the ditching "an outstanding feat", citing several key factors in this water landing's success: pilots' skill, ideal conditions (calm seas, favorable weather, daylight), time to prepare for the ditching and the military passengers' ease with following orders. Pilots who flew over the scene also praised the Northwest crew, calling it the "finest ditching they had ever seen". |
| 21 August 1963 | Tupolev Tu-124 | 52 | 0 | Aeroflot Flight 366 ditched into the Neva River in Leningrad (now St. Petersburg) after running out of fuel. A nearby tugboat pulled the plane to shore where the passengers disembarked onto the tug; all 52 on board escaped without injuries. |
| 23 April 1966 | Ilyushin Il-14 | 33 | 33 | Aeroflot Flight 2723 (an Ilyushin Il-14 registered as CCCP-61772) suffered a dual-engine failure several minutes after taking off from Bina International Airport. The pilots were unable to return to Bina and ended up ditching into the Caspian Sea. The wreckage and occupants were not found until a few months later. All 33 people on board died. |
| 16 September 1966 | C-47A | 27 | 1 | Iberia Flight 261, operated by Spantax on a Douglas DC-3/C-47A-75-DL registered as EC-ACX, was forced to ditch in the Atlantic Ocean due to an engine problem 2 minutes after takeoff. This domestic flight was en route from Tenerife to La Palma in the Canary Islands, Spain. One passenger died during the evacuation. |
| 2 May 1970 | McDonnell Douglas DC-9-33CF | 63 | 23 | ALM Flight 980 (a McDonnell Douglas DC-9-33CF) ditched after running out of fuel during multiple attempts to land at Princess Juliana International Airport on Sint Maarten during low-visibility weather. Insufficient warning to the cabin resulted in several passengers and crew still either standing or with unfastened seat belts as the aircraft struck the water. Of 63 occupants, 40 survivors were recovered by U.S. military helicopters. |
| 17 July 1972 | Tupolev Tu-134 | 5 | 0 | A GosNIIAS Tupolev Tu-134 (CCCP-65607)[ru] was conducting a test flight when both of its engines shut down and the crew were unable to restart the engines. The plane was low on altitude and ditched on the Ikshinskoye reservoir. All 5 people on board survived with no injuries. |
| 11 September 1990 | Boeing 727 | 16 | 16 (presumed) | A Faucett Perú Boeing 727 (OB-1303) was running out of fuel and the pilots sent out a distress message that was picked up by TWA Flight 851 and American Airlines Flight 35, stating that they were preparing to ditch into the Atlantic Ocean. Nothing else was ever heard from the pilots again and the wreckage and occupants were never found. Officials from the Transportation Safety Board of Canada (TSB) believed the plane had in fact ditched into the Atlantic Ocean. |
| 24 April 1994 | Douglas DC-3 | 25 | 0 | A DC-3 (VH-EDC), operated by South Pacific Airmotive, suffered a failure of the left engine at approximately 200 ft (61 m) after taking off from Sydney Airport (Australia). The power of the right engine was insufficient to climb or maintain height, so the pilot carried out a successful ditching. All 25 on board survived with only one minor physical injury. |
| 25 March 1995 | Lockheed P-3 Orion | 11 | 0 | A US Navy Lockheed P-3 Orion ditched into the Arabian Sea 200 miles east of Oman when the Lockheed P-3 Orion suffered a catastrophic loss of the number 4 engine propeller. The catastrophic loss of the propeller resulted in propeller fragments passing through the aircraft fuselage and severing fuel lines and control cables for the remaining 3 engines resulting in a no power water landing. All onboard survived. |
| 23 November 1996 | Boeing 767-260ER | 175 | 125 | Ethiopian Airlines Flight 961 (a Boeing 767-260ER) ditched in the Indian Ocean near Comoros after being hijacked and running out of fuel, killing 125 of the 175 passengers and crew on board. Unable to operate flaps, it impacted at high speed, dragging its left wingtip before tumbling and breaking into three pieces. The panicking hijackers were fighting the pilots for the control of the plane at the time of the impact, which caused the plane to roll just before hitting the water, and the subsequent wingtip hitting the water and breakup are a result of this struggle in the cockpit. Some passengers were killed on impact or trapped in the cabin when they inflated their life vests before exiting. Most of the survivors were found hanging onto a section of the fuselage that remained floating. |
| 29 July 1998 | Embraer EMB-110P1 Bandeirante | 27 | 12 | A Selva Taxi Aéreo Embraer EMB-110P1 Bandeirante (PT-LGN)[de] had an oil pressure issue on the number 2 engine twenty minutes after taking off from Manaus-Eduardo Gomes International Airport and had to be shut down later on. Due to this, the crew decided to turn back to Manaus. The plane could not maintain flight with only one engine since the plane was severely overweight and thus unable to reach Manaus, so the plane ditched on the Manacapuru River. 12 out of the 27 people on board the plane were killed. |
| 13 January 2000 | Short 360 | 41 | 22 | An Avisto Short 360 (HB-AAM) suffered a dual-engine failure after the melting of ice accumulated in both engines. The plane ditched into the Mediterranean Sea, 5 km off Marsa Brega Airport. Out of the 41 people on board, 19 survived, 21 were killed and 1 was missing and is presumed dead. |
| 31 May 2000 | Piper PA-31 | 8 | 8 | A Piper PA-31 Chieftain operating Whyalla Airlines Flight 904 ditched in the Spencer Gulf in South Australia at night after both engines failed. The very dark conditions and lack of visual reference complicated the landing, and the pilot and all 7 passengers were killed. As a result of the accident, regulations in Australia now require that all aircraft carrying paying passengers over water carry life jackets and survival equipment. |
| 27 February 2001 | Shorts 360-100 | 2 | 2 | Loganair Flight 670A, a Shorts 360-100, took off from Edinburgh Airport, United Kingdom. Shortly thereafter, the plane suffered a dual engine failure from an accumulation of large volumes of snow or slush in both engines and ditched in the Firth of Forth. Both pilots, who were the only people on board, were killed. |
| 16 January 2002 | Boeing 737 | 60 | 1 | Garuda Indonesia Flight 421 (a Boeing 737) successfully ditched into the Bengawan Solo River near Yogyakarta, Java Island, after experiencing a twin engine flameout during heavy precipitation and hail. The pilots tried to restart the engines several times before making the decision to ditch the aircraft. Of the 60 occupants, one flight attendant was killed. |
| 21 May 2002 | Douglas DC-3 | 3 | 0 | A Douglas DC-3 registered as X-JBR operated by Aero JBR crashed after performing a regular maintenance flight. The crew had conducted multiple touch-and-go landings when both engines lost power. The crew successfully ditched the airplane in Lake Casa Blanca and were rescued by a boat. |
| 11 November 2002 | Fokker F27 Friendship | 34 | 19 | Laoag International Airlines Flight 585 took off from Manila runway 31 for a flight to Laoag and Basco Airport (BSO). Shortly after takeoff, engine trouble developed in the aircraft's left engine. The pilot declared an emergency and tried to land the plane but decided at the last minute to ditch into the sea. The aircraft broke up and sank in the water. 19 of the 34 occupants were killed. |
| 6 August 2005 | ATR 72 | 39 | 16 | Tuninter Flight 1153 (an ATR 72) ditched off the Sicilian coast after running out of fuel. Of 39 aboard, 23 survived with injuries. The plane's wreck was found in three pieces. |
| 15 January 2009 | Airbus A320 | 155 | 0 | US Airways Flight 1549 (an Airbus A320) successfully ditched into the Hudson River between New York City and New Jersey, after reports of multiple bird strikes. This event is sometimes referred to as "the miracle on the Hudson", as all of the 155 passengers and crew aboard escaped and were rescued by passenger ferries and day-cruise boats, despite freezing temperatures. The ditching occurred near the Circle Line Sightseeing Cruises and NY Waterway piers in midtown Manhattan. |
| 22 October 2009 | Britten-Norman Islander | 10 | 1 | A Divi Divi Air Britten-Norman Islander operating Divi Divi Air Flight 014 ditched off the coast of Bonaire after its starboard engine failed. All 9 passengers survived, but the captain was knocked unconscious; although some passengers attempted to free him, he drowned and was pulled down with the aircraft. |
| 18 November 2009 | Westwind II | 6 | 0 | A Pel-Air West conducting an air ambulance flight using a Westwind II (VH-NGA) ditched into the sea 3 km south-west of Norfolk Island due to the flight crew being unable to land at Norfolk Island in poor weather conditions and not having enough fuel to divert to another airport. All 6 people on board survived. |
| 6 June 2011 | Antonov An-26 | 3 | 0 | A Solenta Aviation Antonov An-26 freighter flying for DHL Aviation ditched in the Atlantic Ocean near Libreville, Gabon. All three crew and the one passenger were rescued with minor injuries. |
| 11 July 2011 | Antonov An-24 | 37 | 7 | Angara Airlines Flight 9007 (an Antonov An-24 turboprop) ditched in shallow water in the Ob River near Strezhevoy, Russia, after an in-flight engine fire. Upon water contact, the tail and one engine broke off, but the rest of the fuselage remained in one piece. Of the 37 people on board, 7 passengers were killed and 19 injured. |
| 11 December 2013 | Cessna 208B Grand Caravan | 9 | 1 | A Makani Kai Air Cessna 208B Grand Caravan (N687MA) ditched shortly after takeoff from Kalaupapa Airport, Hawaii, due to engine failure. The plane sustained substantial damage from the impact. Of the 9 people on board, one passenger was fatally injured, the pilot and two passengers were seriously injured, and five passengers received minor injuries. |
| 26 February 2016 | CASA/IPTN CN-235 | 8 | 0 | While performing routine training exercises, a Casa CN-235M operated by the Royal Malaysian Air Force had its left engine catch aflame. The aircraft subsequently crashed on the beaches of Taman Malawati Utama. 7 of the 8 occupants escaped unharmed with the only injured person being the copilot, who escaped with a broken arm. |
| 22 November 2017 | Grumman C-2 Greyhound | 11 | 3 | A Grumman C-2 Greyhound belonging to supercarrier Ronald Reagan (CVN-76) landed just short of the carrier deck after losing power in both engines. Three occupants were killed. |
| 21 June 2019 | Basler BT-67 | 2 | 0 | A North Star Air Basler BT-67 (C-FKGL) lost power to both engines after the pilot in the left seat, who was not flying the plane, accidentally moved the fuel condition levers while retracting the landing gear. The plane, flying in pitch-black conditions, ditched into Eabamet Lake, Ontario. Both pilots evacuated the plane without injuries. |
| 18 October 2019 | Douglas DC-3 | 2 | 0 | A Douglas DC-3 registered N437GB crashed 2.87 miles (4.61 km) short of runway 13 at Lynden Pindling International Airport in Nassau, Bahamas. The DC-3 was being operated by Atlantic Air Cargo and was on a flight to Lynden Pindling from Miami International Airport. According to the pilot, the aircraft lost power in the left engine 25–30 nautical miles from MYNN. The crew notified MYNN Air Traffic Control of their intent to ditch. The Royal Bahamas Defense Force was notified and landing rescue efforts were implemented. Both the co-pilot and pilot were rescued with no injuries. The aircraft was written off and a limited-scope investigation into the crash was initiated. |
| 2 July 2021 | Boeing 737 | 2 | 0 | On Transair Flight 810, one engine on the Boeing 737-200 cargo aircraft failed en route from Honolulu to the neighboring Hawaiian island of Maui. The crew attempted to turn back to Honolulu's Daniel K. Inouye International Airport, but the plane's second engine overheated, forcing the two pilots on board to ditch the airplane about 4 miles (6.4 km) off the southern coast of Oahu. Both pilots were rescued by the United States Coast Guard. |
| 15 December 2022 | Pilatus PC-6 Porter | 2 | 1 | PK-SNF (nicknamed "Franz"), the last Pilatus PC-6 Porter produced by Pilatus Aircraft, crashed in the water shortly after taking off from Heraklion International Airport after reporting electrical problems. The plane was on a delivery flight with 1 pilot and one passenger from Buochs Airport to Hurghada International Airport, with stops in Maribor Edvard Rusjan Airport and Podgorica Airport. After taking off from Heraklion International Airport, PK-SNF reported unspecified electrical problems. While on a turn back to Heraklion, the aircraft stalled and ditched in the water, killing the 68 year-old Indonesian passenger and slightly injuring the 28 year-old pilot. The aircraft floated upside down for an extended period of time before being recovered by emergency services. It was on delivery to its new owner, Smart Cakrawala Aviation based in Indonesia. |
| 27 January 2026 | Cessna 208B Grand Caravan | 13 | 0 | PK-SNS, a Cessna 208B Grand Caravan, operated by Smart Air on a commercial regional flight in Indonesia, suffered a loss of engine power shortly after takeoff from Douw Aturure Airport, headed to Utarom Airport. The pilots couldn't return to the airport and ditched off the coast of Nabire. All 13 people on board the aircraft survived. |

==== Aircraft landing on water for other reasons ====
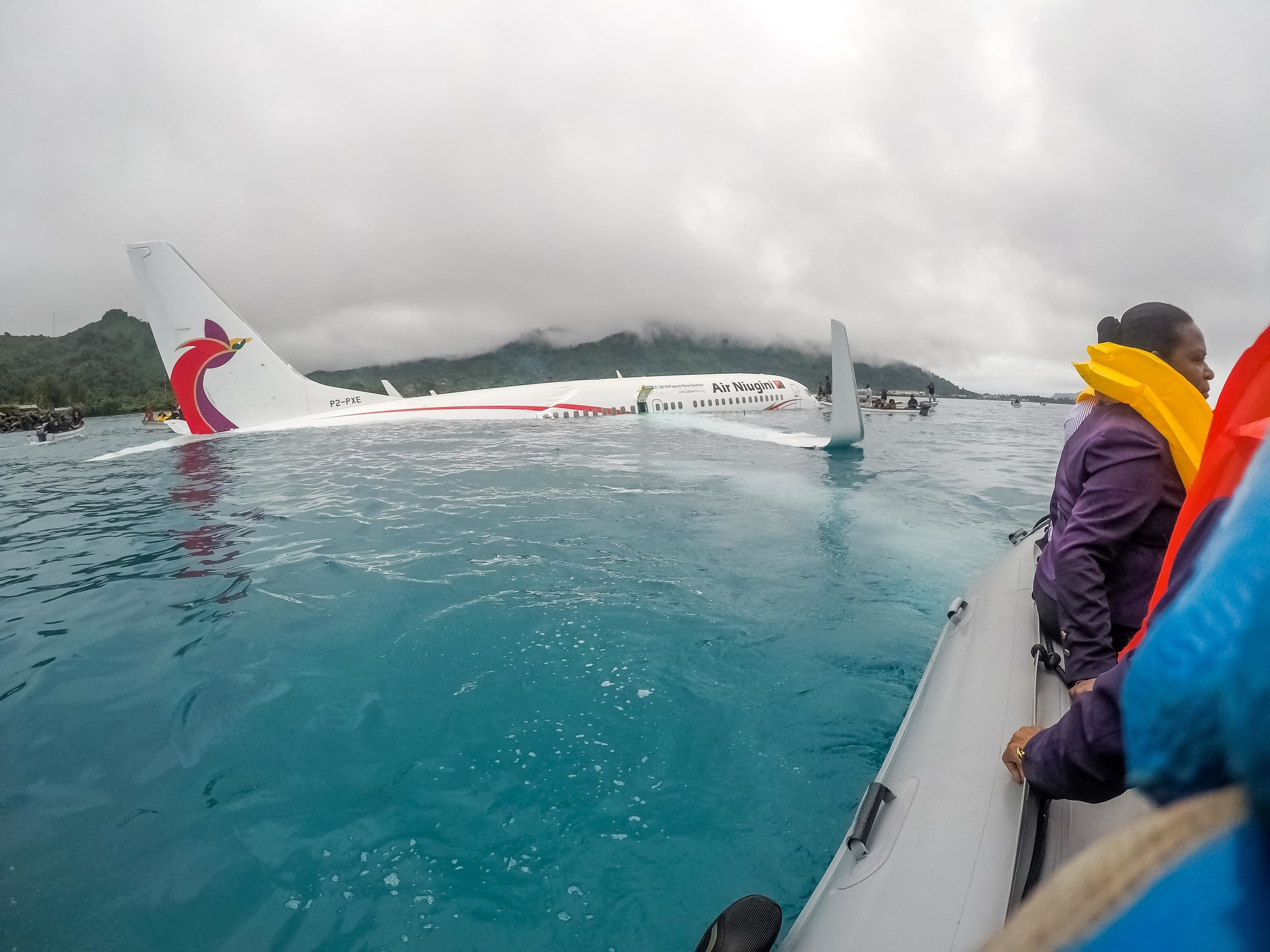
Passengers and crew being rescued by boats after Air Niugini Flight 73 landed in Chuuk Lagoon on 28 September 2018

Aircraft also sometimes end up in water by running off the ends of runways, landing in water short of the end of a runway, or even being forcibly flown into the water during suicidal/homicidal events. Twice at LaGuardia Airport, an aircraft has rolled into the East River (USAir Flight 5050 and USAir Flight 405).

- 5 September 1954: KLM Flight 633, a Lockheed L-1049C-55-81 Super Constellation, suffered a re-extension of the landing gear shortly after taking off from Shannon Airport, which the flight crew was not aware. This caused the plane to descend and ditch into the River Shannon. 28 of the 56 people on board survived.
- 22 November 1968: Japan Airlines Flight 2, a Douglas DC-8-62, landed short of the runway in San Francisco Bay on approach to San Francisco International Airport. There were no fatalities, and the aircraft itself was in good enough condition to be removed from the water, rebuilt, and flown again.
- 13 January 1969: Scandinavian Airlines System Flight 933, a McDonnell Douglas DC-8-62, ditched in Santa Monica Bay while on approach to runway 07R of Los Angeles International Airport, California. Out of the 45 people on board the plane, 4 drowned, 11 are missing and presumed dead, 17 were injured, and 13 sustained no injuries.
- 8 May 1978: National Airlines Flight 193, a Boeing 727 Trijet, unintentionally landed in the waters of Escambia Bay near Pensacola, Florida after coming down short of the runway during a foggy approach. There were 3 fatalities among 52 passengers and 6 crewmembers.
- 7 August 1980: a Tupolev Tu-154B-1 operated by Tarom Romanian Airlines ditched in the water, 300m short of the runway at Nouadhibou Airport (NDB/GQPP), Mauritania. 1 passenger out of 168 passengers and crew died.
- 13 January 1982: Air Florida Flight 90 went down in the icy Potomac river after taking off from Washington National Airport during a snowstorm without proper de-icing. Only 6 out of 79 passengers and crew survived the initial crash, with one of the survivors eventually drowning after helping others to safety. The plane also hit a bridge, killing four and injuring another four motorists.
- 23 January 1982: World Airways Flight 30, landing at Boston Logan International Airport after a flight from Newark, New Jersey, slid off the runway due to ice and landed in Boston Harbor. The cockpit area separated from the remainder of the fuselage at the first row of seats. Two passengers in the first row disappeared and were presumed dead, but the other 210 people aboard survived.
- 9 February 1982: Japan Airlines Flight 350 landed in shallow water in Tokyo Bay short of the runway on approach to Tokyo International Airport, after the captain engaged thrust-reversers due to mental illness. Crew members tried to stop him but were not fully successful. 24 of the 166 passengers and none of the eight crew members died. The captain was found not guilty of any crime due to insanity.
- 28 February 1984: Scandinavian Airlines System Flight 901, a McDonnell Douglas DC-10-30, overran the runway shortly after landing at John F. Kennedy International Airport and ended up with its nose in shallow water. All 177 occupants on board survived with 12 of them sustaining injuries.
- 27 June 1985: American Airlines flight 633 took off from Muñoz Marín Airport in Puerto Rico to Dallas/Fort Worth International Airport in Texas when it overran the runway and nosedived into a nearby lake. All 257 passengers and 13 crew members were evacuated from the DC-10, with at least 25 people injured.
- 31 August 1988: CAAC Flight 301, a Hawker Siddeley Trident, overran the runway at Kai Tak international Airport and ended up in Kowloon Bay, breaking into two pieces. 7 of the 89 occupants on board perished and 15 others sustained injuries.
- 26 September 1988: Aerolineas Argentinas Flight 648, a Boeing 737, landed hard and overran the runway at Ushuaia Airport and ended up in shallow water. All 62 people aboard survived.
- 20 September 1989: USAir 5050, a Boeing 737-401 with 63 people aboard, overran the runway while taking off from New York's La Guardia Airport, landing in the East River and breaking into three pieces, and sustained two deaths.
- 12 September 1993: while landing in poor weather conditions at Faa'a International Airport, Papeete, Tahiti, a Boeing 747 conducting Air France Flight 072 hydroplaned, overshot the runway and ended up with its nose in a lagoon. All 272 passengers and crew evacuated successfully, even though the engines were still running and there was a risk of ingestion.
- 4 November 1993: China Airlines Flight 605, a Boeing 747-409, ended up in water after it overran runway 13 at Kai Tak International Airport on landing during a typhoon with wind gusting to gale force. All of the 396 occupants donned life-vests, boarded the eight slide/rafts and no fatalities resulted. The airframe remained above water even after the aircraft was evacuated.
- 3 February 2000: Trans Arabian Air Transport Flight 310, a Boeing 707-351(C) carrying cargo, grossly overshot the landing strip at Mwanza Airport after a first attempt failed and eventually landed in the middle of Lake Victoria. The plane continued floating after the landing and all five crew survived, some with light injuries.
- 30 April 2000: DAS Air Cargo DC-10-30F freighter (N800WR) approached Entebbe, Uganda runway 35 following a flight from London-Gatwick carrying over 50 tons of cargo. The airplane landed long: 4000–5000 feet down the 12000-foot runway. The nosegear touched down 13 seconds after the main undercarriage. The DC-10 could not be brought to a halt and slid off the runway into Lake Victoria about 100 meters from the southern end of the runway. The DC-10 ended up with the no. 1 and 3 engines submerged and cockpit section separated from the fuselage. The crew members were rescued with a life raft within just 10 minutes of the accident.
- 13 April 2013: Lion Air Flight 904, a Boeing 737-800 (registration PK-LKS) from Bandung to Denpasar (Indonesia) with 108 people on board, undershot runway 09 and ditched into the sea while landing at Ngurah Rai International Airport. The aircraft's fuselage ruptured slightly near the wings. All passengers and crew were safely evacuated with only minor injuries.
- 28 September 2018: a Boeing 737-800 performing Air Niugini Flight 73 landed in a lagoon short of Chuuk International Airport. One of the passengers died, but the 46 other crew and passengers were evacuated by boats.
- 3 May 2019: Miami Air International Flight 293, a Boeing 737-800, hydroplaned and experienced a runway excursion upon landing at Naval Air Station Jacksonville. The airplane came to rest in the shallow waters of St. Johns River, sustaining substantial damage. All 143 passengers and crew on board the plane survived, although twenty-one people on board suffered minor injuries.

==== Military aircraft ====
A limited number of pre-World War II military aircraft, such as the Grumman F4F Wildcat and Douglas TBD Devastator, were equipped with flotation bags that kept them on the surface in the event of a ditching.

The "water bird" emergency landing is a technique developed by the Canadian Forces to safely land the Sikorsky CH-124 Sea King helicopter if one engine fails while flying over water. The emergency landing technique allows the boat-hull equipped aircraft to land on the water in a controlled fashion.

== Space launch vehicle water landings ==
Beginning in 2013 and continuing into 2014 and 2015, a series of ocean water landing tests were undertaken by SpaceX as a prelude to bringing booster rockets back to the launch pad in an effort to reuse launch vehicle booster stages. Seven test flights with controlled-descents have been conducted by April 2015.

Prior to 2013, successful water landings of launch vehicles were not attempted, while periodic water landings of space capsules have been accomplished since 1961. The vast majority of space launch vehicles take off vertically and are destroyed on falling back to earth. Exceptions include suborbital vertical-landing vehicles (e.g., Masten Xoie or the Armadillo Aerospace' Lunar Lander Challenge vehicle), and the spaceplanes that use the vertical takeoff, horizontal landing (VTHL) approach (e.g., the Space Shuttle, or the USAF X-37) which have landing gear to enable runway landings. Each vertical-takeoff spaceflight system to date has relied on expendable boosters to begin each ascent to orbital velocity. This is beginning to change.

Recent advances in private space transport, where new competition to governmental space initiatives has emerged, have included the explicit design of recoverable rocket technologies into orbital booster rockets. SpaceX has initiated and funded a multimillion-dollar program to pursue this objective, known as the reusable launch system development program.

The orbital-flight version of the SpaceX design was first successful at accomplishing a water landing (zero velocity and zero altitude) in April 2014 on a Falcon 9 rocket and was the first successful controlled ocean soft touchdown of a liquid-rocket-engine orbital booster. Seven test flights with controlled-descent test over-water landings, including two with failed attempts to land on a floating landing platform, have been conducted by April 2015.

In October 2024 the upper stage of SpaceX's Starship spacecraft performed a controlled, high accuracy water landing in the Indian Ocean near a pre-positioned buoy that captured footage of the splashdown.
