= Divi Divi Air =

Small regional airline in Curaçao

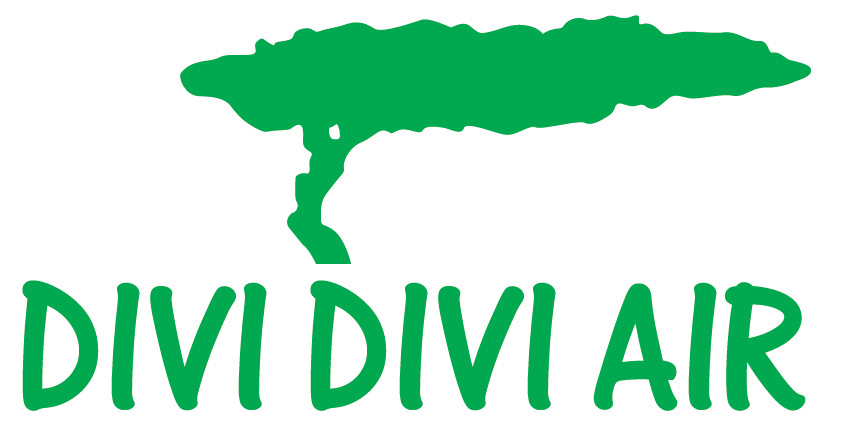
| IATA | ICAO | Call sign |
|---|---|---|
| 3R | DVR | DIVI AIR |
- Founded: 2000
- Commenced operations: 2001
- Hubs: Curaçao International Airport
- Secondary hubs: Flamingo International Airport
- Fleet size: 7
- Destinations: 3
- Parent company: Bai Bini Air Tours N.V.
- Headquarters: Curaçao
- Key people: Germaine N.F. Richie-Durand (CEO), Danielle Durand
- Website: Fly Divi Divi

Divi Divi Air N.V. is a small regional service airline in the southern Caribbean Sea, with headquarters on the island of Curaçao. The airline has been in service since 2001 and is named after the divi-divi trees which grow natively in the region.

== History ==
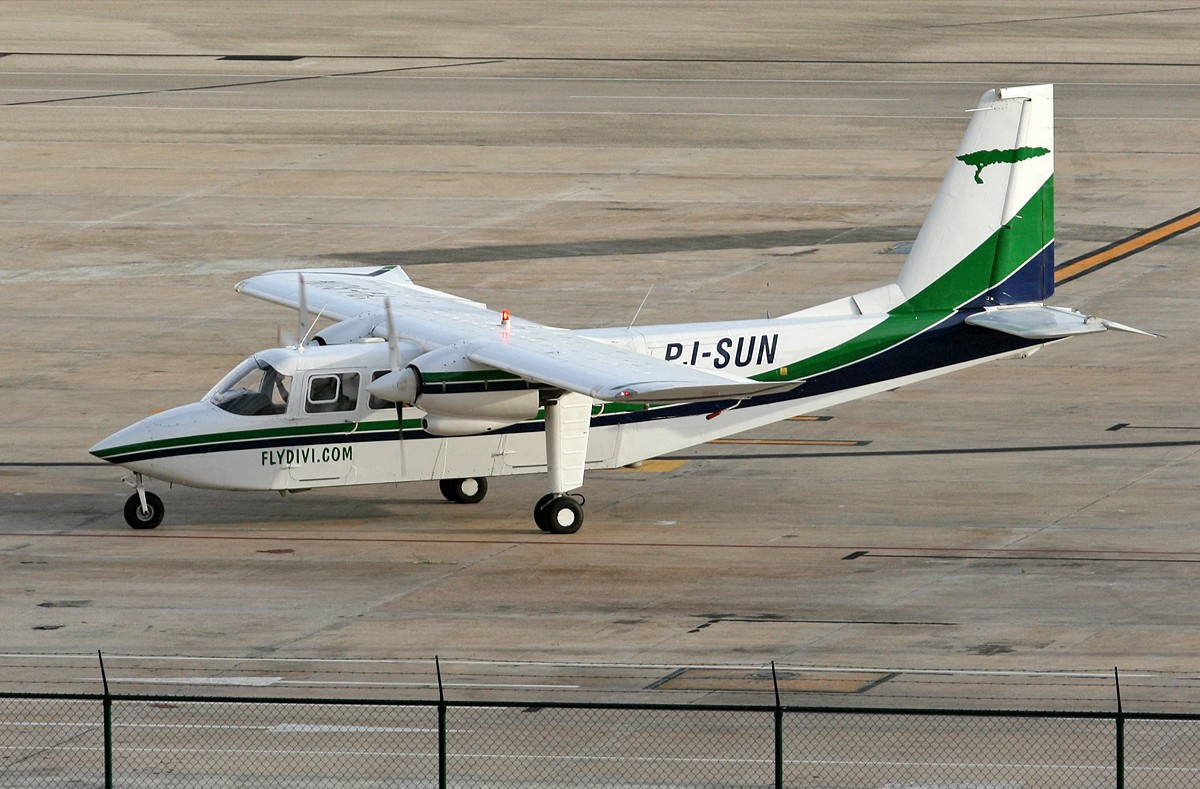
Divi Divi Air Britten-Norman BN-2 Islander PJ-SUN, 2007

Divi Divi Air was founded on July 28, 2000, and commenced operations in 2001 with a fleet of Britten-Norman BN-2 Islanders, with service between Curaçao and Bonaire. Aruba was added as a destination by the airline in February 2018.

Divi Divi Air operates the Curaçao-Aruba service at least twice daily, the Curaçao-Bonaire service approximately ten times a day, and flights out of Bonaire to Aruba are scheduled once a week. Flight equipment for scheduled travel is either Twin Otter or Britten-Norman Islander aircraft.

In October 2018, it was announced that Divi Divi Air, in collaboration with Corendon Dutch Airlines, would commence flights to Sint Maarten and Brazil for the winter season.

In April 2020, Divi Divi Air acquired its third Britten-Norman BN-2 Islander.

== Destinations ==
As of 2025, Divi Divi Air flies to three destinations all of which are on the ABC islands.

| Territory | City | Airport | Notes | Refs |
|---|---|---|---|---|
| Aruba | Oranjestad | Queen Beatrix International Airport | | |
| Bonaire | Kralendijk | Flamingo International Airport | | |
| Curaçao | Willemstad | Curaçao International Airport | Hub | |

== Fleet ==
=== Current fleet ===
As of April 2026, the Divi Divi Air passenger fleet consists of the following aircraft:

| Aircraft | In service | Orders | Passengers | Notes |
|---|---|---|---|---|
| Britten-Norman BN-2 Islander | 2 | — | 48 | |
| De Havilland Canada DHC-6 Twin Otter | 5 (as of July 2026) | — | 19 | |
| Total | 7 | — | | |

=== Former fleet ===
Over the years, Divi Divi Air has operated the following aircraft types:

| Aircraft | Total | Passenger capacity | Notes |
|---|---|---|---|
| Britten-Norman BN-2 Islander | 1 | 9 | Crash landed in 2009 |
| Cessna 402B | 1 | 7 | Disassembled |
| Dornier 228 | 1 | 19 | Sold |
| Total | 3 | | |

== Accidents ==
On October 22, 2009, a Britten-Norman BN-2A Islander operating as Divi Divi Air Flight 014 (PJ-SUN) suffered an engine failure and ditched into the ocean five minutes from the Flamingo Tower at the airport in Bonaire. The pilot was knocked unconscious on impact; passengers could not undo his safety harness and the pilot went down with the aircraft. Rescue vessels picked up all nine passengers. The final accident investigation report stated many mistakes and errors made by the pilot as reasons for the outcome of the flight.
