= Loganair Flight 670A =

2001 aviation accident in Scotland

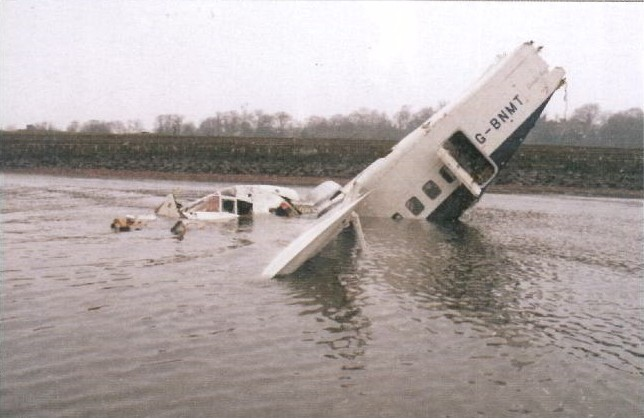
- Wreckage of the aircraft in the Firth of Forth

Accident
- Date: 27 February 2001
- Summary: Ditched following dual engine failure
- Site: Firth of Forth, Scotland

Aircraft
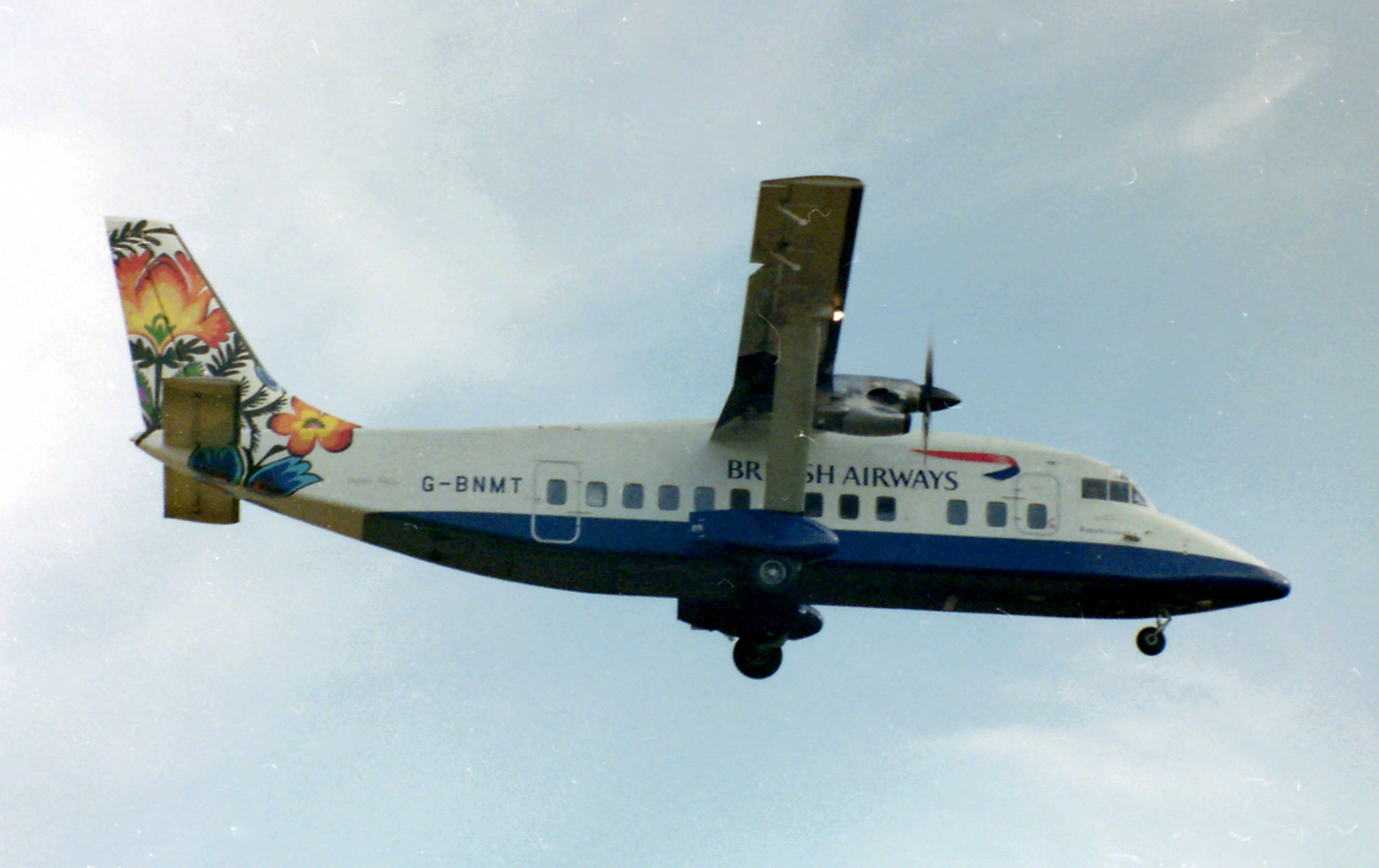
- G-BNMT, the aircraft involved in the accident, pictured in 2000
- Aircraft type: Short 360-100
- Operator: Loganair on behalf of British Airways
- IATA flight No.: LM670A
- ICAO flight No.: LOG670A
- Call sign: LOGAN 670 ALPHA
- Registration: G-BNMT
- Flight origin: Edinburgh Airport
- Destination: Belfast International Airport
- Occupants: 2
- Passengers: 0
- Crew: 2
- Fatalities: 2
- Survivors: 0

Loganair Flight 670A (LC670A) was a scheduled cargo flight for Royal Mail from Edinburgh-Turnhouse Airport, Scotland to Belfast International Airport. On 27 February 2001, the Short 360 operating the flight ditched in the Firth of Forth off Edinburgh at around 17:30 local time; the two crewmembers' bodies were found in the wreckage a few hours after the accident.

== Aircraft and crew ==
The accident aircraft was a Short 360-100 turboprop airliner manufactured by Short Brothers Limited in 1987, registered G-BNMT. It was powered by two Pratt & Whitney Canada PT6A-67R engines. Its passenger seats had been removed for use as a freighter and its Certificate of Airworthiness was valid until 15 October 2001. The aircraft was loaded with 1,360 kg (3,000 lb) of fuel and carried 1,040 kg (2,293 lb) of cargo with a total weight at takeoff of 10,149 kg (22,375 lb). Maximum certified takeoff weight of the Short 360 is 12,292 kg (27,099 lb). The aircraft bore a livery inspired by Polish folk art called Kogutki Łowickie / Cockerel of Lowicz as part of British Airways' "Worldtail" scheme.

The crew consisted of 58-year-old Carl Mason from Ayr, holding a valid Airline Transport Pilot's licence and with 13,569 hours' flying experience, as the captain. The first officer was 29-year-old Russell Dixon, from Oxfordshire, with a valid licence and 438 total flight hours.

== Accident ==
At 17:10 local time the first officer requested clearance and, after a short delay, the crew taxied to depart from runway 06. With the pilot flying, a normal takeoff was followed by a normal reduction in power at 1,200 feet amsl. At 2,200 feet the co-pilot selected the anti-icing systems on while the pilot changed to a new radio frequency. Four seconds later the torque indicators for both engines rapidly fell to zero and the aircraft suffered a complete loss of propeller thrust. As the first officer radioed a Mayday call on the Air traffic control frequency, the pilot initiated a descent with a reduced airspeed of 110 kn (200 km/h; 130 mph) while turning right towards the coast. Realising they could not reach shore, the crew prepared for ditching. At an airspeed of 86 kn (159 km/h; 99 mph) with a 6.8 degree nose up and 3.6 degree left wing down attitude the aircraft impacted the water heading 109 degrees magnetic.

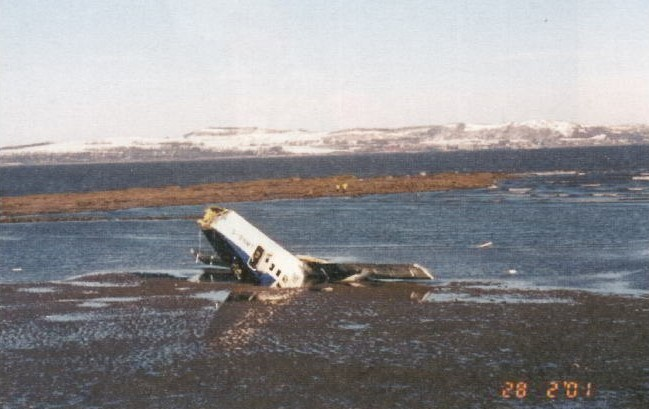
Another view of the wreckage

== Aftermath ==
The aircraft was found 65 m (213 ft) off shore in a 45 degree nose down attitude, with the forward half of the fuselage submerged in a water depth of approximately 6 m (20 ft). The flight deck was almost completely destroyed and the fuselage was firmly embedded in the sand. The empennage had separated and was found floating 100 m (330 ft) to the east of the main wreckage. Both crew seats remained attached to the flight deck floor with no failure of the safety harnesses. The cockpit voice recorder (CVR) and flight data recorder (FDR) were both recovered intact. The Short 360 was eventually salvaged with some difficulty, and was dismantled before it was transported to Air Accidents Investigation Branch (AAIB) headquarters at Farnborough for a detailed examination.

== Cause ==
Upon investigation, it was concluded that the accident had been caused primarily by the lack of an established practical procedure for flight crews to install engine air intake covers in adverse weather conditions.

The aircraft landed at Edinburgh Airport, Scotland, at midnight in snow conditions and was then parked heading directly into moderate to strong surface winds for approximately 17 hours. Because no protecting plugs were put inside the engine intakes, the wind drove a significant amount of snow into the intakes. The intake plugs were not carried as part of the aircraft's onboard equipment and they were not readily available at Edinburgh Airport. Information concerning freezing weather conditions in the aircraft manufacturer's maintenance manual had not been included in the airline's Short 360 Operations Manual and was therefore not complied with. The AAIB discovered that large volumes of snow or slush could have accumulated where it would not have been readily visible to the crew during a pre-flight inspection (the engine intakes on a Short 360 are about 2.8 m (9 ft 2 in) above the ground). On takeoff this snow changed the engine intake air flow, causing both engines to flame out after both engines' anti-ice vanes were simultaneously opened as per the standard operating procedure. It was noted by the investigators that selecting engine anti-ice 'on' sequentially with a time interval between would have prevented a simultaneous dual engine flameout.

== Similar occurrence ==
During the course of the investigation the AAIB was made aware of a similar incident approximately one year before the loss of G-BNMT. A Short 360 operated by the company Avisto for Sirte Oil Company suffered a dual engine power loss while on its takeoff run. The source of the problem was found to be the accumulation of ice and snow during operation in sub-zero temperatures.

== Recommendations ==
As a result of this incident several recommendations were released by the AAIB and the aircraft manufacturer suggested changes to current operations of Short 360 aircraft in near-zero or sub-zero temperature conditions, including:

- Flight Operation Department Communication 17/2001 published on 20 October 2001 by the AAIB.
- All Operator Message SD002/02 released by Short Brothers on 4 March 2002.
- Recommendations 2002-39, 2002–40 and 2002–41 based on findings of the investigation, issued by the AAIB.

== In popular culture ==
The crash was featured in season 25, episode 5 of the Canadian documentary series Mayday, also known as Air Crash Investigation, titled "Powerless Plunge".
