= Divi Divi Air Flight 014 =

2009 aviation accident near Bonaire, Leeward Antilles

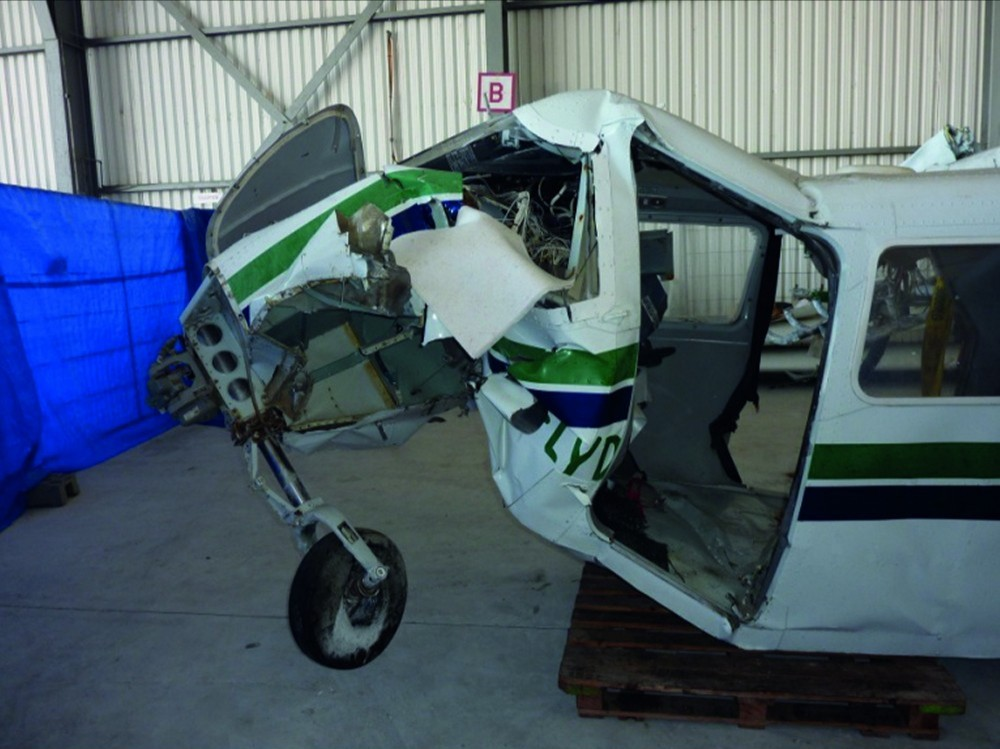
- The wreckage of the aircraft retrieved after the crash

Occurrence
- Date: 22 October 2009
- Summary: Engine failure, ditching at sea
- Site: Off the Coast of Bonaire; 12°14′30.96″N 68°32′49.40″W

Aircraft
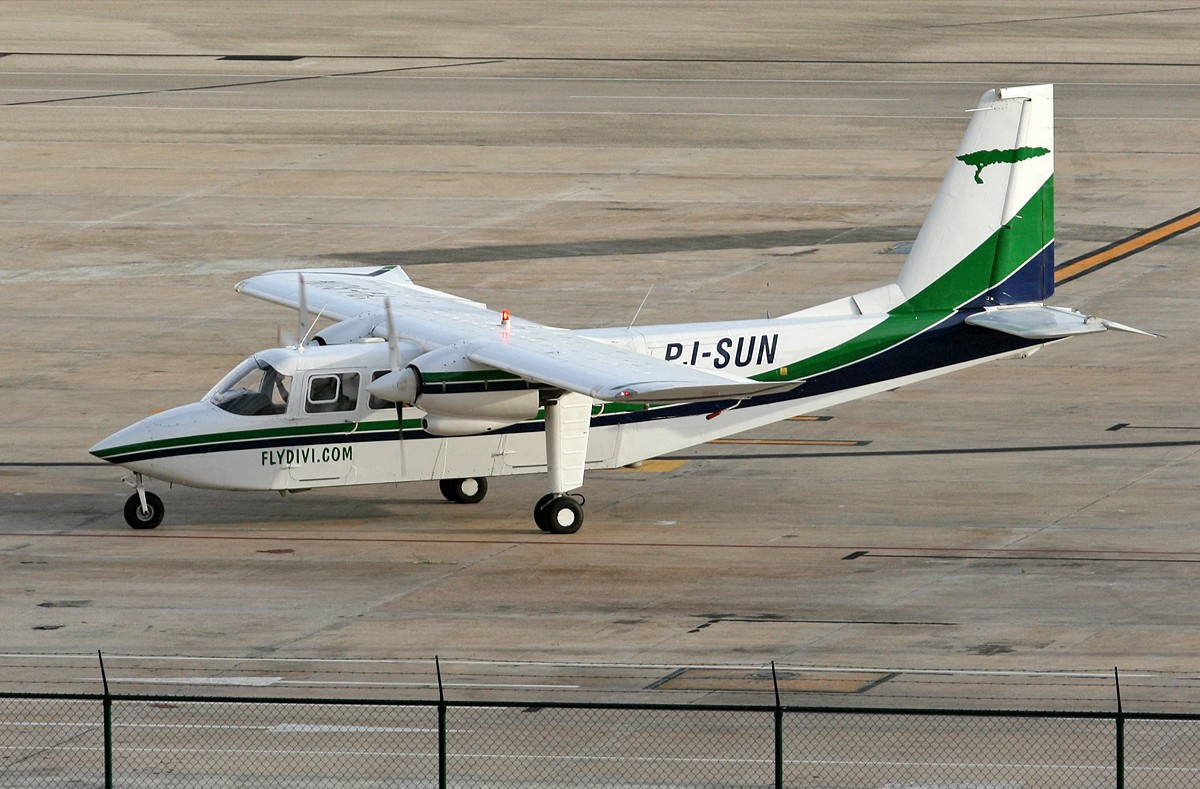
- PJ-SUN, the Britten-Norman BN-2A-8 Islander aircraft involved in the accident, seen at Curaçao International Airport
- Aircraft type: Britten-Norman BN-2A Islander
- Operator: Divi Divi Air
- IATA flight No.: 3R014
- ICAO flight No.: DVR014
- Call sign: DIVI AIR 014
- Registration: PJ-SUN
- Flight origin: Hato International Airport, Willemstad, Netherlands Antilles, Curaçao, Netherlands Antilles
- Destination: Flamingo International Airport, Kralendijk, Bonaire, Netherlands Antilles
- Occupants: 10
- Passengers: 9
- Crew: 1
- Fatalities: 1
- Survivors: 9

Divi Divi Air Flight 014 (some sources refer to it as Flight 016) was a scheduled commuter flight from Hato International Airport in Curaçao to Flamingo International Airport in Bonaire carrying a single pilot and nine passengers, which on 22 October 2009 crashed in the Caribbean Sea off the coast of Bonaire due to an engine failure.

== Aircraft ==
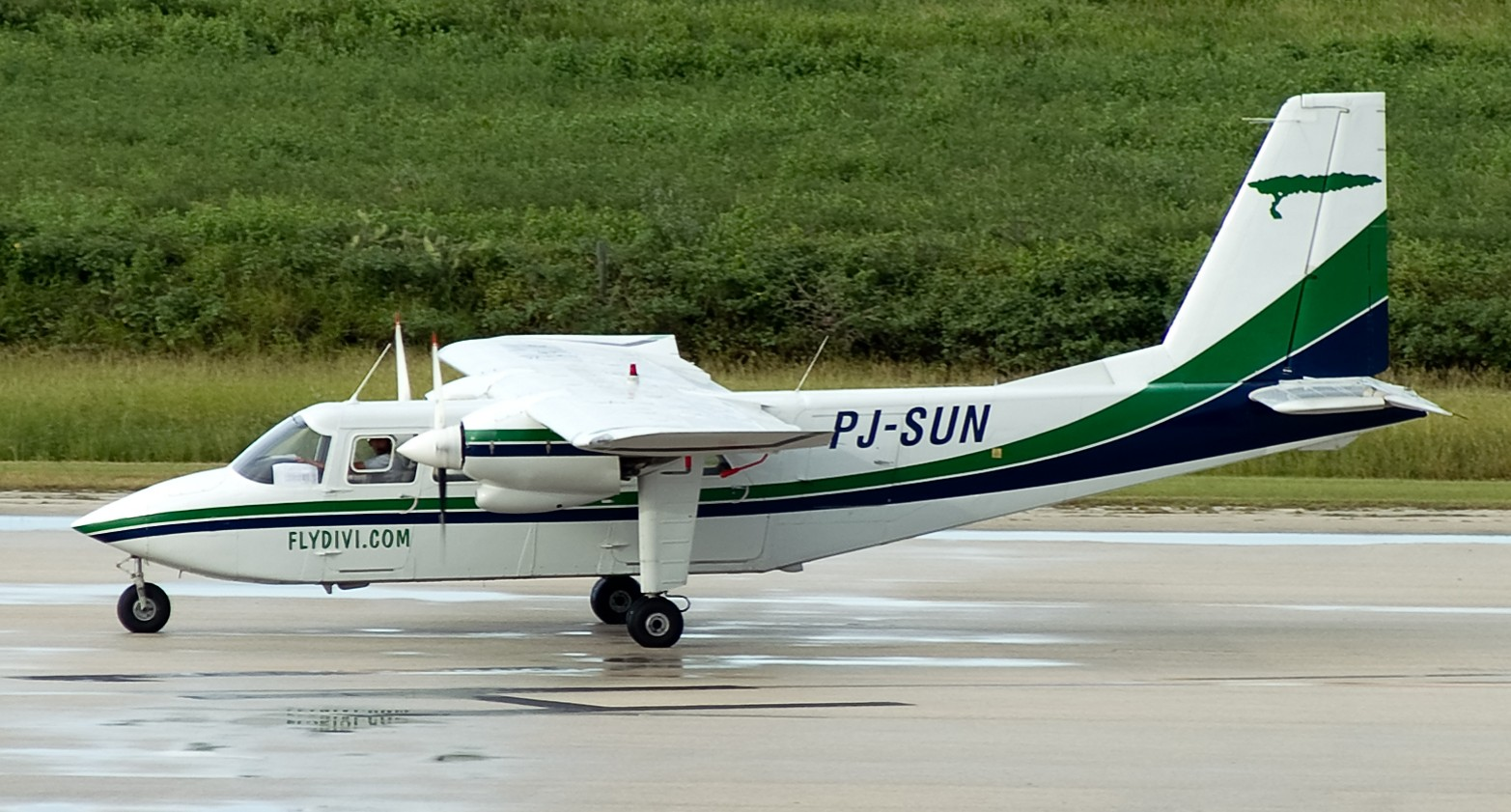
PJ-SUN, the Britten-Norman BN-2A-8 Islander aircraft involved in the accident, seen at Daly River Airport

The aircraft involved was a Britten-Norman BN-2A Islander, registration PJ-SUN. The aircraft made its first flight on 12 December 1973, and was therefore almost 36 years old at the time of the accident.

== Accident ==
The flight originated from Hato International Airport in Curaçao en route to the Flamingo International Airport on the sister island of Bonaire. The aircraft departed from Curaçao at 09:48 with an estimated landing time of 10:13 at Bonaire. Approximately 10 minutes after departure the starboard engine failed in flight. The pilot, Robert Mansell, elected to continue the flight to Bonaire on the remaining engine and contacted Flamingo Tower at approximately 24 nautical miles (44 km) west of Bonaire. He informed the controller that he was flying on one engine. Following the engine failure, the aircraft started to lose altitude at a rate of about 200 feet per minute until it impacted the water at a position approximately 0.5 nmi (930 m) south of Klein Bonaire and 3 nmi (5.6 km) west of the main island at time 10:17.

Moments before the ditching Mansell looked into the cabin and gave the thumbs up to the passengers, checking that their life vests were on.

During the ditching, at impact with the water surface, the cockpit door and left main landing gear were detached from the aircraft. All nine passengers survived the ditching and were rescued by a nearby diver's boat. The passengers reported that after the ditching, the pilot was injured and appeared to be unconscious as he did not try to remove himself from the aeroplane. The pilot actually went down with the aircraft despite the efforts of some passengers who tried to remove him from his seat while the aeroplane was sinking.
