= Marsa Brega Airport =

- IATA: LMQ; ICAO: HLMB

Summary
- Airport type: Public
- Serves: Brega, Libya
- Elevation AMSL: 50 ft (15 m)
- Coordinates: 30°22′41″N 19°34′35″E

Map
- Location of airport in Libya

Runways
Direction	Length		Surface
Direction	m	ft	Surface
15/33	2,205	7,234	Asphalt
- Source: WAD GCM SkyVector

Marsa Brega Airport (IATA: LMQ, ICAO: HLMB) is an airport serving Brega, a Mediterranean coastal port in the Al Wahat District of Libya. The airport is 3 kilometres (1.9 mi) south of the town.

== Facilities ==
The airport resides at an elevation of 50 feet (15 m) above mean sea level. It has one runway designated 15/33 with an asphalt surface measuring 2,205 by 30 metres (7,234 ft × 98 ft). The runway length includes a 190 metres (620 ft) displaced threshold on Runway 33.

The Marsa Brega non-directional beacon (Ident: MB) is located on the coastline 2.4 nautical miles (4.4 km) north of the airport.

== Accidents and incidents ==
- On 13 January 2000, a Short 360 took off from Tripoli International Airport at 09:29 UTC with two flight crew, one cabin crew and 38 passengers to Marsa Brega, a city known for its oil refinery. The aircraft was leased from Avisto Air Service, a firm based in Zurich, Switzerland, which focused on aircraft maintenance and repair, to Sirte Oil Company. The crew had noticed a fuel imbalance prior to the flight, making a log entry and cross-feeding fuel before the flight. The aircraft started its descent at 11:25 UTC. At 11:36 UTC the left engine flamed out then, The aircraft plunged into the sea 5 kilometres (3.1 mi; 2.7 nmi) off of Marsa Brega. The front part of the aircraft was totally destroyed. The tail of the aircraft detached from the fuselage on impact, in a 10° nose up position. As the aircraft began to sink, water started to fill into the cabin. One British survivor escaped after kicking out an aircraft window as the aircraft began to sink.

== See also ==
- Transport in Libya
- List of airports in Libya
