= 2000 Marsa Brega Short 360 crash =

2000 aviation accident in Libya

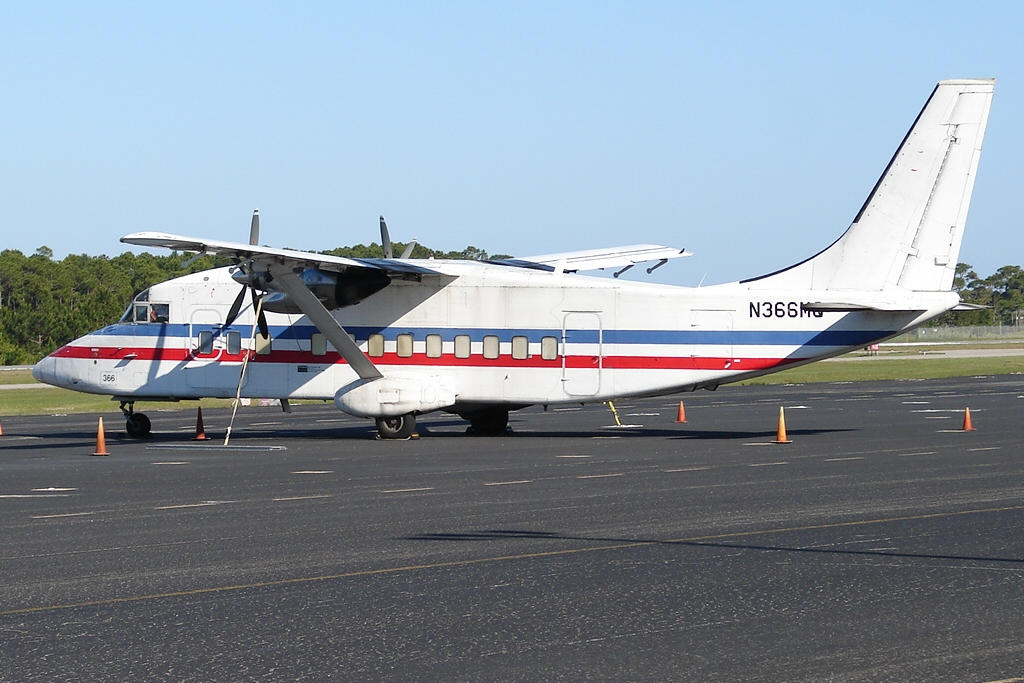
- A Short 360 similar to the aircraft involved in the crash

Accident
- Date: 13 January 2000
- Summary: Ditching caused by icing
- Site: Mediterranean Sea, 5 km (3.1 mi; 2.7 nmi) off Marsa Brega Airport, Marsa Brega, Libya; 30°23′45.7″N 019°28′9.53″E

Aircraft
- Aircraft type: Short 360
- Operator: Avisto for Sirte Oil Company
- Registration: HB-AAM
- Flight origin: Tripoli International Airport, Tripoli, Libya
- Destination: Marsa Brega Airport, Marsa Brega, Libya
- Occupants: 41
- Passengers: 38
- Crew: 3
- Fatalities: 22
- Injuries: 17
- Survivors: 19

The 2000 Marsa Brega Short 360 crash occurred on 13 January 2000 when a Swiss-registered Short 360 leased by Avisto ditched into the sea near Marsa Brega in Libya. The aircraft was chartered by Sirte Oil Company to transport oil workers to the city. It was carrying 41 people (38 passengers and three crew). Most of the passengers were foreigners. As both engines failed in mid-flight, the crew chose to ditch the aircraft. A total of 22 people died in the crash.

An official investigation concluded that the de-icing device on the aircraft was not activated. The aircraft flew into an adverse weather condition and an icing condition occurred in mid-flight. The ice melted and flooded the engine, causing both engines to fail. The pilots were distracted by conversations unrelated to the flight and were not aware of the condition of the aircraft until it was already too late.

== Background ==
To transport its employees and their families between facilities, Sirte Oil Company operates a number of aircraft. The company normally operates Fokker F28 for flights to and from Tripoli, while Short 360 and DHC-6 Twin Otter are used for short routes and desert airstrips, even though Short 360s are occasionally used for flights between Marsa Brega and Tripoli due to high volumes of passengers. Flights with Short 360s are usually operated by two captains rather than a captain and a first officer. This is due to the lack of first officers in the company. That being said, the flight crew are conditioned with this issue.

The aircraft's short range of travel and the unpressurized condition of the flight makes it an unsuitable choice for high altitude flights. The flight crew usually choose to fly a shortcut route to Marsa Brega to avoid a long trip and the aircraft sometimes fly up to 10 nautical miles (12 mi; 19 km) from the coast line. The minimum altitude for flying to Marsa Brega is at 13,000 feet (4,000 m) and the area near and around Marsa Brega typically does not have heavy traffic.

== Passengers and crew ==
At least 38 passengers and 3 crew were on board the flight, including three children and one infant. The British ambassador in Tripoli, Richard Dalton, confirmed that there were 13 Britons on board. Other nationalities on board included 14 Libyans, three Indians, two Canadians, two Croatians, three Filipinos, and one person each from Tunisia and Pakistan.

| Nationality | Passengers | Crew | Total |
|---|---|---|---|
| Canada | 2 | 0 | 2 |
| Croatia | 2 | 0 | 2 |
| India | 3 | 0 | 3 |
| Libya | 14 | 2 | 16 |
| Pakistan | 1 | 0 | 1 |
| Philippines | 3 | 0 | 3 |
| Tunisia | 0 | 1 | 1 |
| United Kingdom | 13 | 0 | 13 |
| Total | 38 | 3 | 41 |

The captain was 42-year-old Abdul-Hafeez al-Abbar, a Libyan national with a total flying experience of 8,814 hours, 3,840 of which were on the Short 360. The first officer was a 49-year-old Libyan national, identified only as Bashir, with a total flying experience of 10,422 hours, 1,950 of which were on the type. The Swiss firm Avisto, which owned the aircraft, said that both pilots were "senior and very experienced".

== Aircraft ==
The aircraft involved in the crash was a Short 360, a commuter turbo-prop airliner that was manufactured in Belfast, United Kingdom. The aircraft was registered in Switzerland as HB-AAM. The Short 360 has a good safety record as a commuter aircraft. The aircraft had 7,138 flying hours. It was equipped with two engines from Pratt & Whitney Canada and two propellers from Hartzell Propeller.

== Flight ==
The aircraft took off from Tripoli International Airport at 09:29 UTC with two flight crew, one cabin crew and 38 passengers to Marsa Brega, a city known for its oil refinery. The aircraft was leased from Avisto Air Service, a firm based in Zürich, Switzerland, which focused on aircraft maintenance and repair, to Sirte Oil Company. The crew had noticed a fuel imbalance prior to the flight, making a log entry and cross-feeding fuel before the flight. The aircraft started its descent at 11:25 UTC. At 11:36 UTC the left engine flamed out. The Captain then told the First Officer: "We just had an engine failure". The First Officer then stated that the oil pressure decreased. The Captain then ordered the first officer to raise the landing gear and flaps, then asked him to confirm if they just had an engine failure. He later ordered to shut down the engine:

- 11:36:58 Captain : "We just had an engine failure"
- 11:37:00 First Officer: "You are not kidding"
- 11:37:01 First Officer: "Oil pressure going low"
- 11:37:03 Captain : "Power"
- 11:37:04 First Officer: "OK"
- 11:37:05 Captain : "Ok, power on the right engine"
- 11:37:11 First Officer: "OK, checked"
- 11:37:12 [Warning sound]
- 11:37:21 Captain : "OK gears and, flaps are up"
- 11:37:23 First Officer: "Yes"
- 11:37:25 Captain : "Confirm left engine failure"
- 11:37:26 First Officer: "Confirmed"
- 11:37:27 Captain : "Shut down left engine"

After the First Officer shut down the left engine, the right engine flamed out. The Captain then told the First Officer that they had lost both engines. The Captain then ordered the First Officer to contact Marsa Brega for an emergency landing.

- 11:37:29 Captain : "Oh, oh, my god!"
- 11:37:33 First Officer : "What happened?"
- 11:37:34 First Officer : "Right generator."
- 11:37:35 Captain : "Both failures, two engine failures!"
- 11:37:38 First Officer : "Yes."
- 11:37:39 Captain : "Just call Marsa Brega!"

The crew then contacted Marsa Brega Tower, requesting an emergency landing. The Captain asked the First Officer to restart the engine. As they prepared for an emergency landing (ditching), multiple warnings sounded in the cockpit. The Captain then ordered the First Officer to open the emergency hatch. The ATC asked the crew to confirm the emergency. As the First Officer confirmed the emergency, the aircraft impacted water.

- 11:38:30 First Officer : "Oh Lord!"
- 11:38:32 ATC : "Confirm emergency"
- 11:38:34 First Officer : "Emergency at sea!"
- 11:38:34 [Sound of impact and end of recording]

The aircraft plunged into the sea 5 kilometres (3.1 mi; 2.7 nmi) off of Marsa Brega. The front part of the aircraft was totally destroyed. The tail of the aircraft detached from the fuselage on impact, in a 10° nose up position. As the aircraft began to sink, water started to fill into the cabin. One British survivor escaped after kicking out an aircraft window as the aircraft began to sink.

Search and rescue team were immediately deployed by authorities. At least 19 people were rescued and evacuated from the sea. Among them were 10 Libyans, seven Britons and two Indians. The rescue effort was hampered by bad weather. Swiss Transportation Ministry spokesman Hugo Schiltenhelm received reports that 15 people had died in the crash. Local fishing boats also joined the search and rescue effort. Both the captain and the first officer survived the crash, but the cabin crew member did not.

== Investigation ==
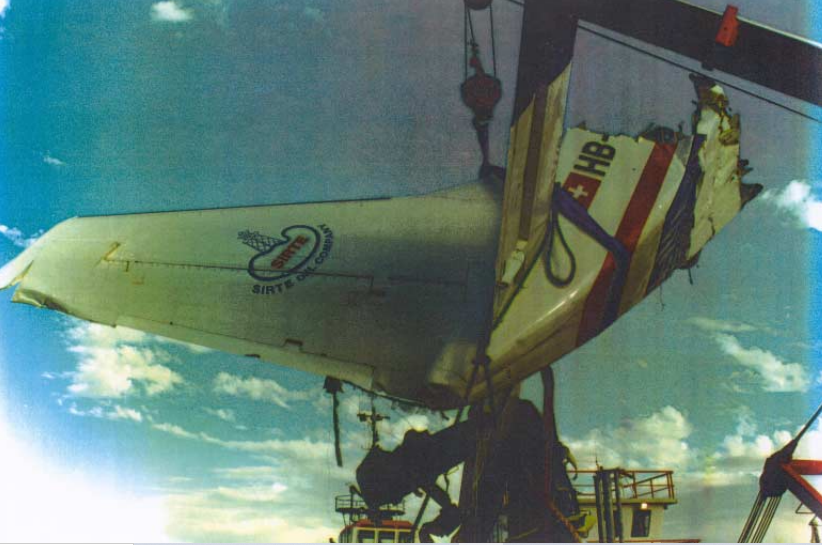
Recovered tail section of HB-AAM

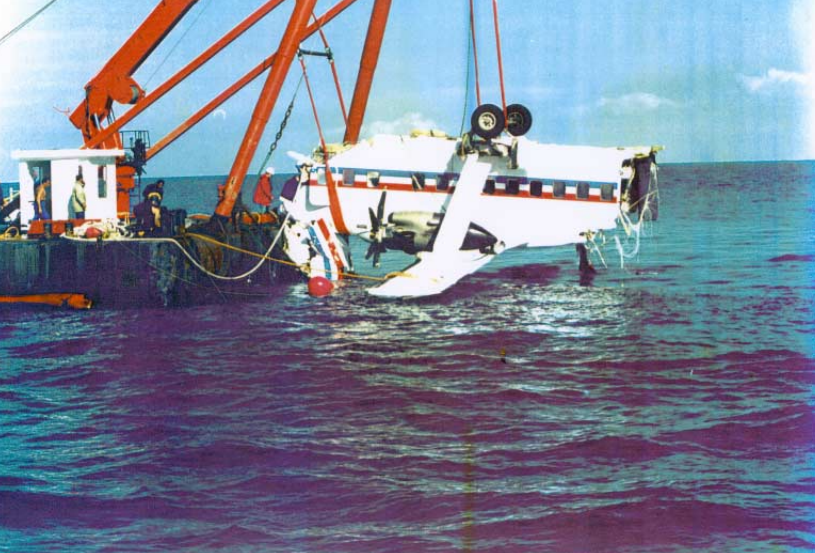
Main fuselage of the involved Short 360

Salvage workers were deployed to the crash site to retrieve the flight data recorder (FDR) and cockpit voice recorder (CVR), and were eventually able to recover the wreckage of the Short 360 within nine days of the accident. The Swiss Transportation Safety Investigation Board (STSIB), British Air Accidents Investigation Branch (AAIB), and American National Transportation Safety Board (NTSB) joined with the Libyan Civil Aviation Authority (LCAA) to investigate the cause of the crash. The AAIB had offered their facility of Farnborough in Hampshire to analyse the content of the black boxes.

=== Engine failure ===
Everyone on board the aircraft agreed that both engines had failed in mid-flight. There was no unusual sound from either engine and so metal or mechanical failure were ruled out from the possible causes of the crash. Investigators also ruled out fuel contamination following close examination on the fuel samples that had been collected from the crash site. Fuel exhaustion was also ruled out as the amount of fuel was sufficient for the aircraft to continue the flight to Marsa Brega. Crew mismanagement and fuel supply cut off were also considered as unlikely due to lack of evidence.

The investigation finally concluded that the source of the engine failure was from flooding of the engines. The aircraft had been exposed to moisture from clouds and the decrease in outside temperature to −6 degrees Celsius (21 degrees Fahrenheit) would make a favorable condition for icing. The aircraft later descended into lower altitude, melting the ice and causing the engines to be flooded.

=== Flight crew error ===
Tripoli International Airport provides weather reports for each flight. According to the investigation, in most of his flights the captain did not care much on the weather report and did not care enough to ask the weather personnel to "explain any outstanding points" due to the weather in Libya which "tends to be mild" with no significant weather changes throughout the year. Post-crash interview with the captain revealed that he thought that Tripoli Airport had not provided the weather briefing on the route. The provided weather report indicated that the aircraft would likely fly into significant cloud formation along the route to Marsa Brega.

As the aircraft was flown into clouds, the engines were exposed to moisture. The outside temperature was at −6 °C (21 °F) and provided a suitable condition for icing. To prevent ice from forming on the aircraft, the flight crew should have turned on the aircraft's anti-icing system. However, during the majority of the flight the flight crew were engaged in a conversation about the operating system of Fokker F28, causing the crew to be distracted from the ice formation on the wind shield. The cockpit voice recorder later confirmed that the flight crew eventually became aware on the icing condition as ice began to form on the wind shield. The flight crew then elected to turn on the ice detection and anti-icing system on the Short's pitot static and wind shield but the engine's anti-icing system remained in the off position.

The decision to not turn on the anti-icing system on both engines led to ice formation on both engines. Formation of ice on the aircraft's engines intake would lead to a rise in temperature and both crews should have been aware of this since this information would have been displayed on the primary flight display. However, rather than paying attention to the abnormal condition on both engines the crew were still busy engaging in conversation on the system of Fokker F28. The aircraft then began its descent to 2,000 feet (610 m) and lower. The freezing altitude at the time was at 5,200 feet (1,600 m) and the decision to decrease the aircraft's altitude outside from the freezing altitude caused the ice to melt and flood both engines, resulting in both the left and right engines flaming out.

In accordance with the written procedure, the flight crew should have attempted to relight the malfunctioning left engine. The procedure, however, was viewed as impractical by investigators due to the time required, in this case could take as long as 30 seconds, which would only give the crew a mere six seconds before impact. Further investigation, however, concluded that had the crew opted to turn on the engine's ignition system to relight both engines then the aircraft would have generated power until a safe landing was achieved. The crew never attempted to relight the engines and the loss of power from both engines caused the aircraft to descend rapidly.

=== Deaths due to drowning ===
The Tunisian cabin crew did not inform the passengers that the seat cushions of the aircraft could be used as a flotation device, an alternative to life jackets. The aircraft was not equipped with life jackets even though each allocated seats were provided with safety cards that read "Life vest under your seat" at the back. In the absence of life jackets, passengers would have needed an alternative for a flotation device. By not informing passengers on the use of seat cushions as an alternative, many of the passengers might have drowned due to exhaustion. The presence of flotation device could benefit passengers in case search and rescue team did not manage to find survivors in a timely manner.

Avisto and representatives from Switzerland stated that flotation devices are not required for flights flying at less than 50 miles (43 nmi; 80 km) or more from land, explaining why the aircraft was not equipped with life vests.

=== Conclusion ===
Investigators concluded that the crash was caused by melting of the ice that had been formed at both engines following the failure of the flight crew to turn on the engine's anti-icing system, resulting in the flooding of both engines and causing both engines to fail. The crew failed to monitor the condition of their aircraft as they were being engaged in conversations unrelated to the flight.

Subsequently, a total of 6 recommendations were issued by investigators, among those were the inclusion of the correct ditching technique in zero flaps condition following total loss of power.

== See also ==
- Eastern Air Lines Flight 212, a crash which was caused by the flight crew's irrelevant conversation during a critical phase of the flight
- Air Florida Flight 90, similar crash in which cockpit idle chatter led to icing due to crew's failure to monitor ice formation
- Loganair Flight 670A, a similar crash which happened in the Firth of Forth near Edinburgh Airport, in Scotland, United Kingdom in 2001
