= Falcon Air Express =

Airline of the United States (1995–2015)

IATA	ICAO	Call sign
F2	FAO	PANTHER
- Founded: 1995
- Commenced operations: March 1996
- Ceased operations: June 5, 2015
- Secondary hubs: Mesa Gateway Airport, Arizona
- Fleet size: 7
- Headquarters: Miami, Florida
- Website: www.flyfalconair.com

Falcon Air Express was a charter airline which was based in Miami, Florida, United States. Falcon Air turned in its certificate to the FAA on June 5, 2015, following the loss of a contract with the US Department of Justice and mounting debt. Falcon Air Express also provided scheduled service from Miami to Curaçao under the banner Dutch Antilles Express, which also ceased service abruptly. Their remaining aircraft are currently at the Lakeland Linder International Airport.

== Fleet ==
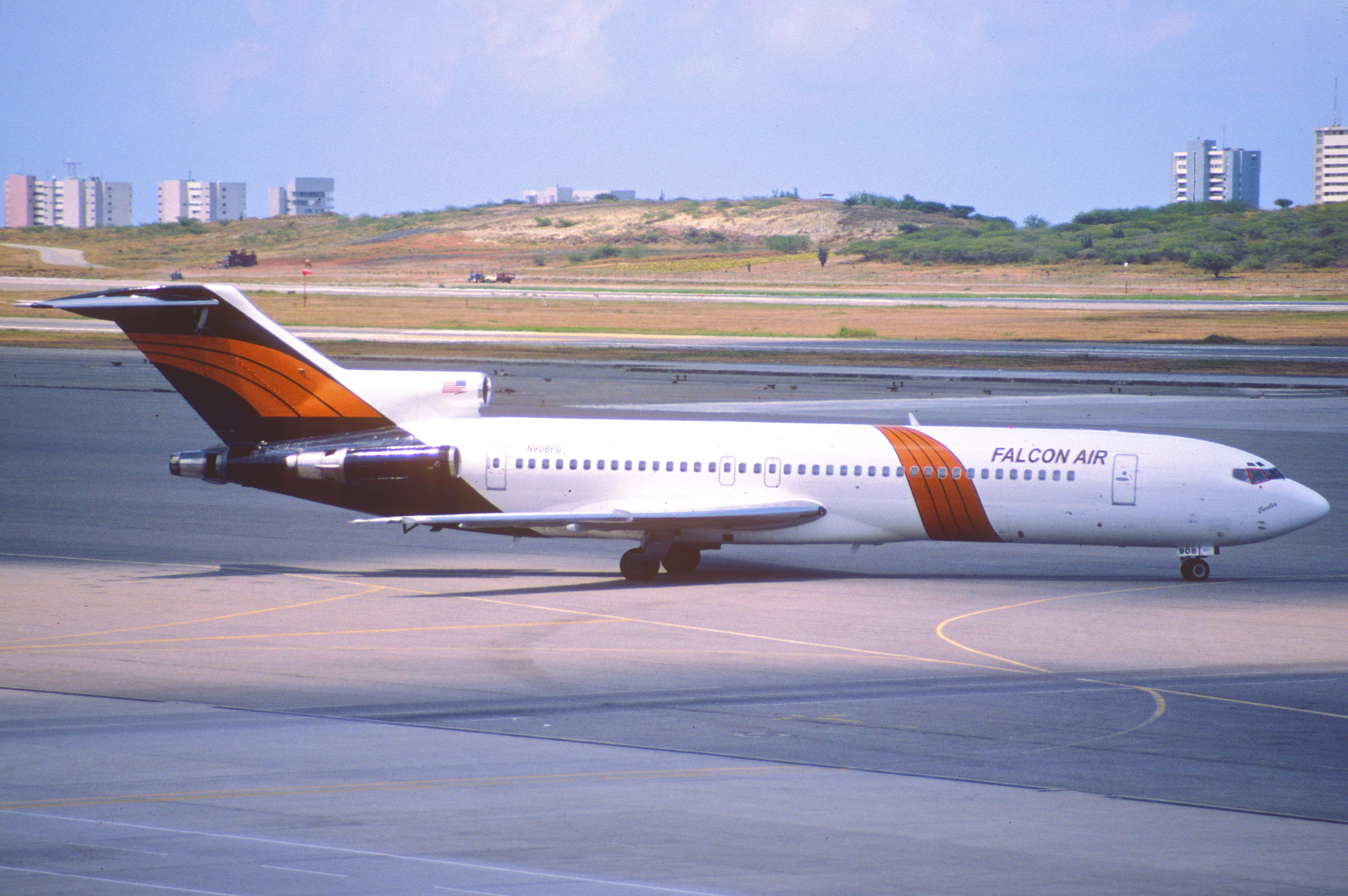
Falcon Air Express Boeing 727-200

The Falcon Air Express fleet included the following aircraft:

Falcon Air Express Fleet
Aircraft	Total	Introduced	Retired	Notes
ATR 72-200	2	2013	2013	
Boeing 727-200	4	1998	2007	
Boeing 737-300	2	2004	2006	
McDonnell Douglas MD-82	1	2008	2009	
McDonnell Douglas MD-83	9	2009	2015	

== See also ==
- List of defunct airlines of the United States
