= Dutch Antilles Express =

Netherlands Antillean airline

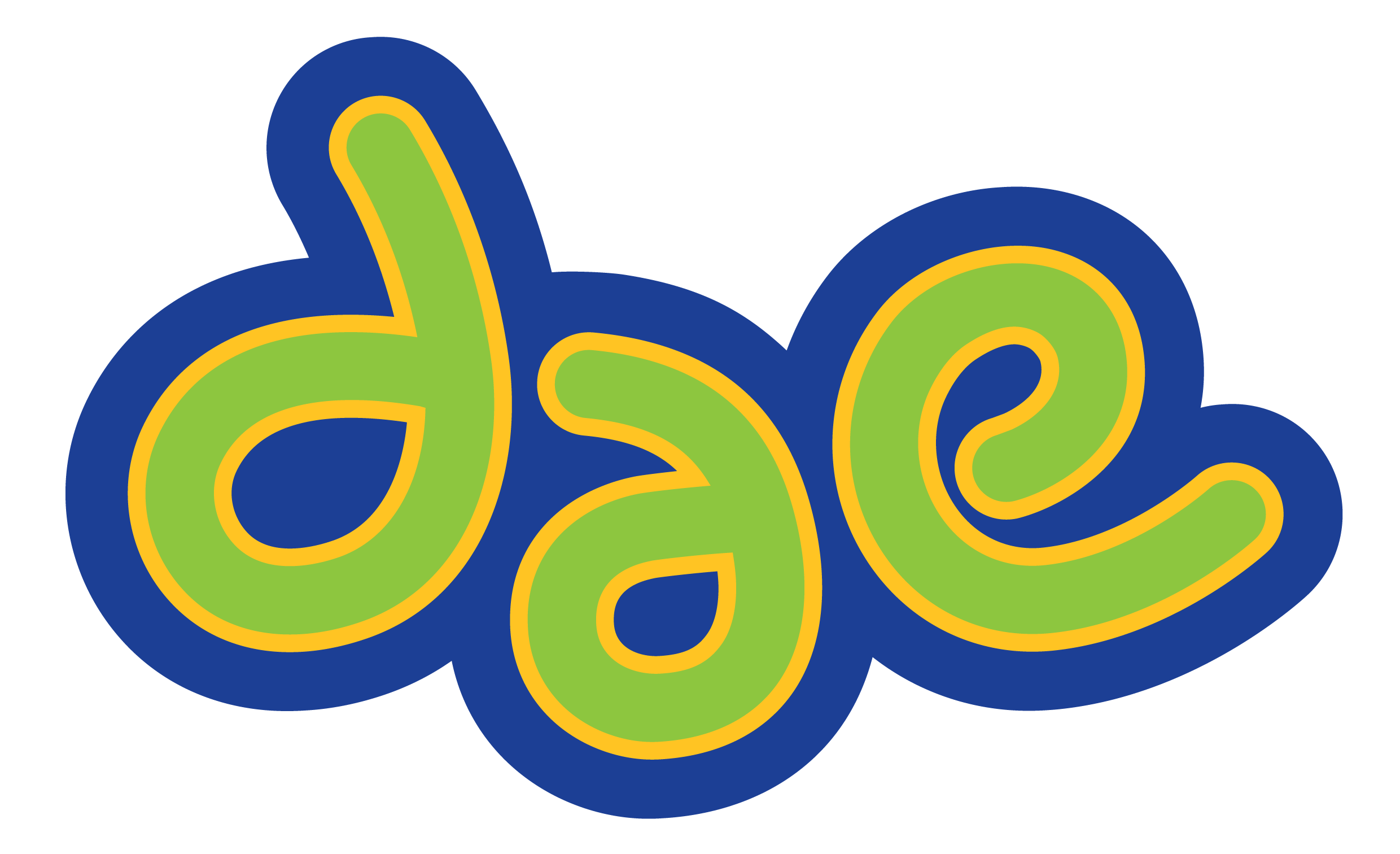

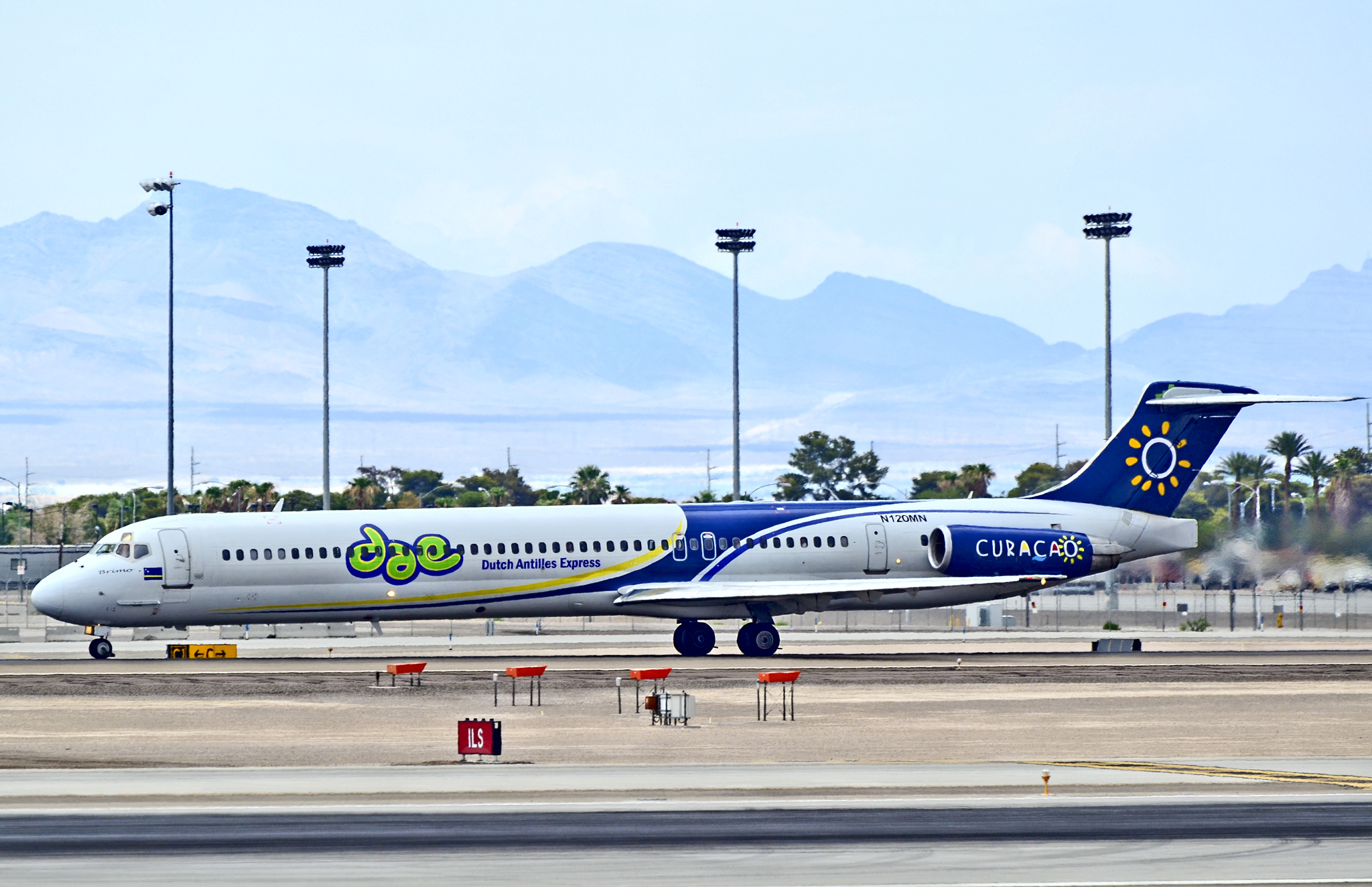
- A Dutch Antilles Express Brimo McDonnell Douglas MD-83
IATA	ICAO	Call sign
9H	DNL	DUTCH ANTILLES
- Founded: 2005
- Commenced operations: April 30, 2005
- Ceased operations: September 19, 2013
- Hubs: Curaçao International Airport
- Focus cities: Queen Beatrix International Airport; Flamingo International Airport; Princess Juliana International Airport; Miami International Airport
- Fleet size: 8
- Destinations: 8
- Headquarters: Willemstad, Curaçao
- Key people: Steve Frederick Sloop (CEO); Aldrich Hermelijn (public relations director)
- Website: www.flydae.com

Dutch Antilles Express B.V. was an airline of the Dutch country of Curaçao in the southern Caribbean Sea, specifically the Dutch Caribbean region. It operated high-frequency scheduled services in the Dutch Caribbean to United States, Dominican Republic, Colombia, Haiti, and Suriname. Its main base was at Curaçao International Airport.

Due to an escalating debt from poor market conditions, the government of Curaçao stepped in on May 31, 2011, to keep the airline in the air. The airline has been purchased from Arnold Leonora by the Curaçao government for a cash injection sum of two injections of 1.5m Guilders (approx US$838,000 each). The company slogan was Your Caribbean Wings.

In August 2013, the company's management and employees approached the Curacao government through various departments for a new loan of 5m Guilders (approx. US$2.8 million) to, among other items, pay employee salaries outstanding from July 2013. The appeal for the loan was denied by the Curacao Parliament on August 16, 2013. The Court of First Instance of Curaçao declared DAE bankrupt on August 30, 2013.

== History ==
=== Original operations ===
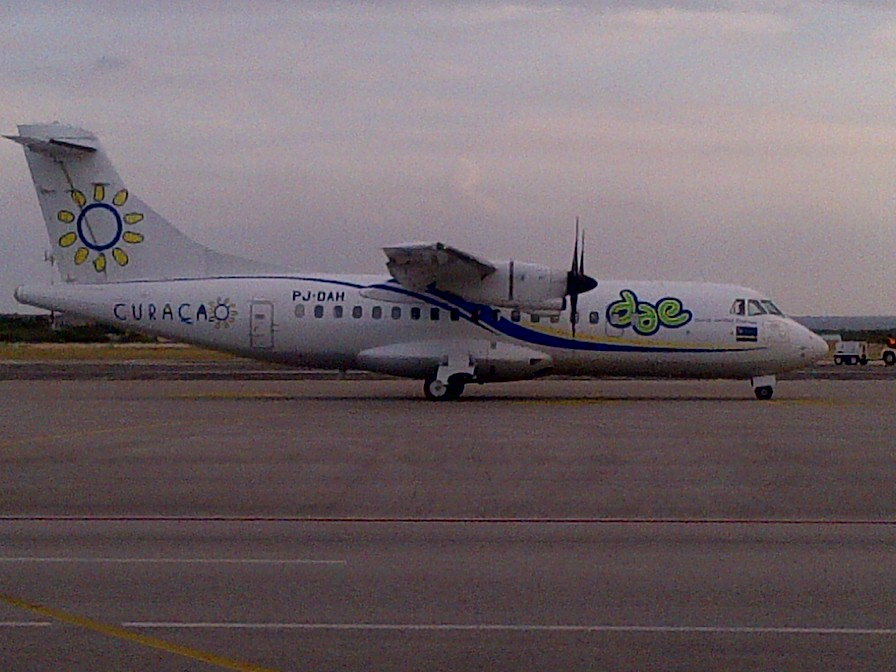
A DAE ATR 42-320 departing Queen Beatrix International Airport in 2012

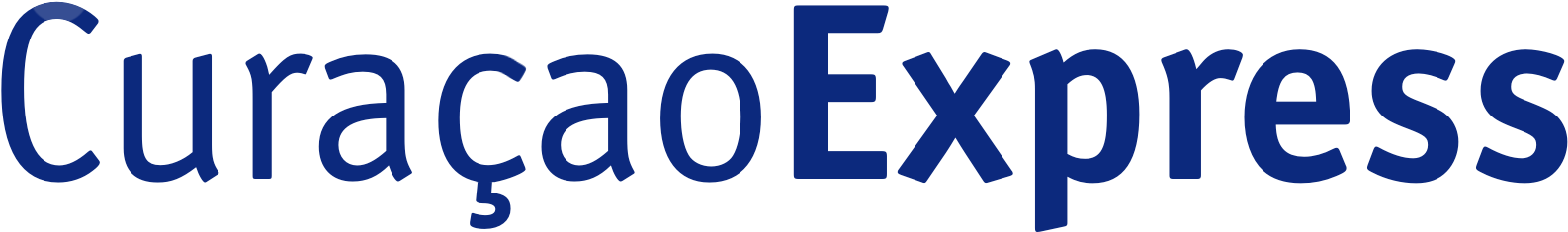
Curaçao Express logo

The airline started operations with three ATR 42s in 2003 as BonairExel (part of the ExelAviation Group) and soon expanded to encompass most of the Dutch Antilles and Aruba. Although an Embraer ERJ 145 was used on the Bonaire-Aruba flights, the aircraft was soon disposed of again, returning to Air Exel. Although it flew its aircraft in the Exel color scheme; operated with Air Exel aircraft; and flew with Air Exel cabin staff; the airline was wholly owned by a Dutch millionaire residing on Bonaire, and operated simply as a franchise carrier. As the local market was rather small, a subsidiary was formed on Curaçao, named CuraçaoExel. CuraçaoExel planned to expand with new aircraft types and destinations in the United States and South America. Dutch Caribbean Airlines (DCA) declared bankruptcy not long after. ExelAviation noticed that the Caribbean airlines were very profitable, and set up its own ArubaExel, causing distress amongst the other franchise carriers.

With ExelAviation expanding too rapidly in Europe and the Caribbean, a lawsuit against Nick Sandman (owner of the BonairExel and CuraçaoExel) demanded back the invested amount, and confiscated back its ATR 42.This link dissolved both ExelAviation Group and the Caribbean franchised airlines. With minimal funds, the airline made an attempt to distance itself from its partner, changing their names to Bonair Express and Curaçao Express. This move permanently broke up the alliance, causing no more profits to go to the ailing ExelAviation Group.

Previously the airline's head office was in the Plasa Medardo SV Thielman in Kralendijk, Bonaire. In April 2007 the airline moved its head office from Bonaire to Curaçao, where the airline's flight operations have been based. The airline's call centre and its revenue accounting and handling departments remained in Bonaire.

After numerous lawsuits, Bonair Express and Curaçao Express merged to form Dutch Antilles Express, which started operations on April 30, 2005 with flights between the Netherlands Antilles and Aruba. On December 9, 2005, its first international services to Valencia, Venezuela, were launched.

=== Bankruptcy and cessation of flights ===
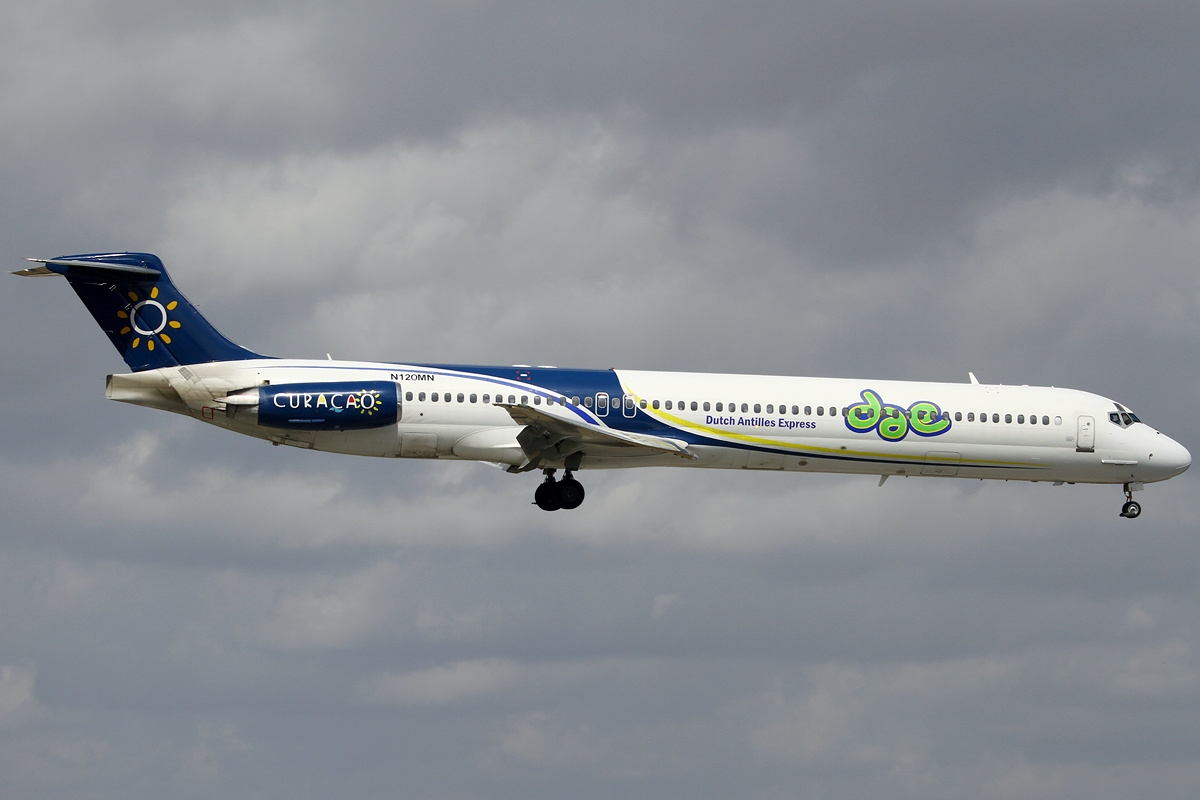
A DAE McDonnell Douglas MD-83 landing at Miami International Airport in 2013

In March 2013, the National Institute of Civil Aviation (INAC) suspended the landing rights of DAE to Maracaibo based on failure to provide adequate service and accommodation to passengers. During this period, DAE had several aircraft that were undergoing required heavy maintenance, resulting in unavailability to perform some scheduled routes. While it is stated in the documents released by INAC that the suspension was temporary until scheduling issues could be resolved, DAE never restarted operations to Maracaibo.

In May 2013, INAC released an order suspending DAE's operating rights within the whole of Venezuela, claiming safety and security violations. These findings were publicly disputed by DAE in the media, particularly by Nelson Ramiz, who was a consultant to DAE, as well as the owner and CEO of Falcon Air Express, which provided wet-leased aircraft to Dutch Antilles Express.

In June 2013, the first ground stop due to non-payment of services occurred in Suriname. This was resolved through the court system by implementing a cash basis payment agreement and services resumed within days. The employees approached former Curaçao Prime Minister Gerrit Schotte to negotiate the lifting of the suspension by the Venezuela government and allow DAE to once again operate to Venezuelan cities. Shortly after, the Venezuelan government issued a revocation of all operating permits for DAE aircraft in Venezuela as of June 16, 2013.

In July 2013, management of Dutch Antilles Express approached the Curaçao Airport Holdings group regarding a capital loan of 5m Guilders. It became public that DAE's main competitor, Insel Air, had sent correspondence through the government proposing to purchase the government shares of DAE and take over the operations of the company, which was not pursued by the government. At this point, it also became public that DAE had received permission from the Curaçao government to develop nine new destinations as compensation for the loss of the Venezuelan markets. Curacao Airport Holdings declined to provide assistance; however, the Curaçao Parliament took up the question of providing additional public funds to the airline in August, when it became public that employee salaries had not yet been paid for July.

During the first week of August, the St. Maartin airport issued a "ground hold" for all DAE aircraft landing at the airport. Since St. Maarten and Curaçao share a common Civil Aviation department, and since DAE held a valid air operator's certificate issued by Civil Aviation, St. Maarten could not legally prevent any DAE aircraft from landing; however, it could hold that aircraft on the ground as collateral against the arrears. The airport and the airline agreed to enter negotiations and the airport allowed DAE aircraft to depart for several days as "relief" flights. By August 6, 2013, DAE had stopped operating to St. Maarten and was unable to come to an agreement with the airport, it would not service since.

On August 12, 2013, it was reported that one of Dutch Antilles Express's largest creditors, Girobank, had placed liens against their accounts, effectively stopping any cash flow from the business accounts. The following day, DAE employees assembled at the government offices in Curaçao to appeal for the council to reconsider its decision regarding the company.

By August 16, the airline was experiencing significant cash flow issues and had to cancel and consolidate flights to minimize fuel expenses. The Curacao Parliament discussed the ramifications of Dutch Antilles Express falling into bankruptcy and the economic impact that such an event would have on Curaçao. The reviewed finances of the company were reviewed in a closed session and the Parliament decided to decline further assistance to the airline by a vote of 9-9, with 3 absences (simple majority required to pass). The next day, DAE was prevented from using the check-in services of Curaçao Airport for a short time and admitted that services to Bonaire had been canceled as of the week before due to non-payment of navigation charges.

On August 24 at 00:01, the Curaçao Airport placed a departure restriction on all Dutch Antilles Express flights. As all of their flights either originated or arrived at Curaçao, this effectively stopped all operations. Over the next days, all DAE aircraft were returned to their lessors and all flights throughout the network were canceled. Shortly thereafter, IATA withdrew the airline from the Billing and Settlement Plan (BSP), preventing travel agents from selling or refunding tickets of the airline.

Two groups of employees petitioned the Curaçao Court of First Instance to declare the airline bankrupt. At a closed hearing on August 30, 2013, a judge issued a preliminary ruling that the company was indeed bankrupt and could not continue. On September 11, the company appealed the ruling of the bankruptcy judgement.

On September 19, shortly before the scheduled hearing regarding the bankruptcy judgement, DAE withdrew its objection to the ruling, which reaffirmed the bankruptcy of the company. The Curaçao Civil Aviation suspended their air operator's certificate for a period of 60 days until final judgement and disposition of the company can be determined by the court. This action likely marked to end of Dutch Antilles Express.

== Livery ==
There were several differences in the liveries of Dutch Antilles Express aircraft.

One Fokker 100 was using the newer livery. The other two had the old DAE livery. It is all white and on the tail section it has the DAE logo. The fuselage had the DAE website on it. The planes were planned to be updated with the new livery at the next C-Check.

The McDonnell Douglas MD-83 operated by Falcon Air Express had a newer livery, the fuselage had blue and yellow stripes which represents the waters of the Caribbean from which Curacao forms a part of and the sun, typical of standard Caribbean weather. The engines have Curacao's official logo on it and the aircraft's tail features the O representing the sun from Curaçao's logo.

== Destinations ==
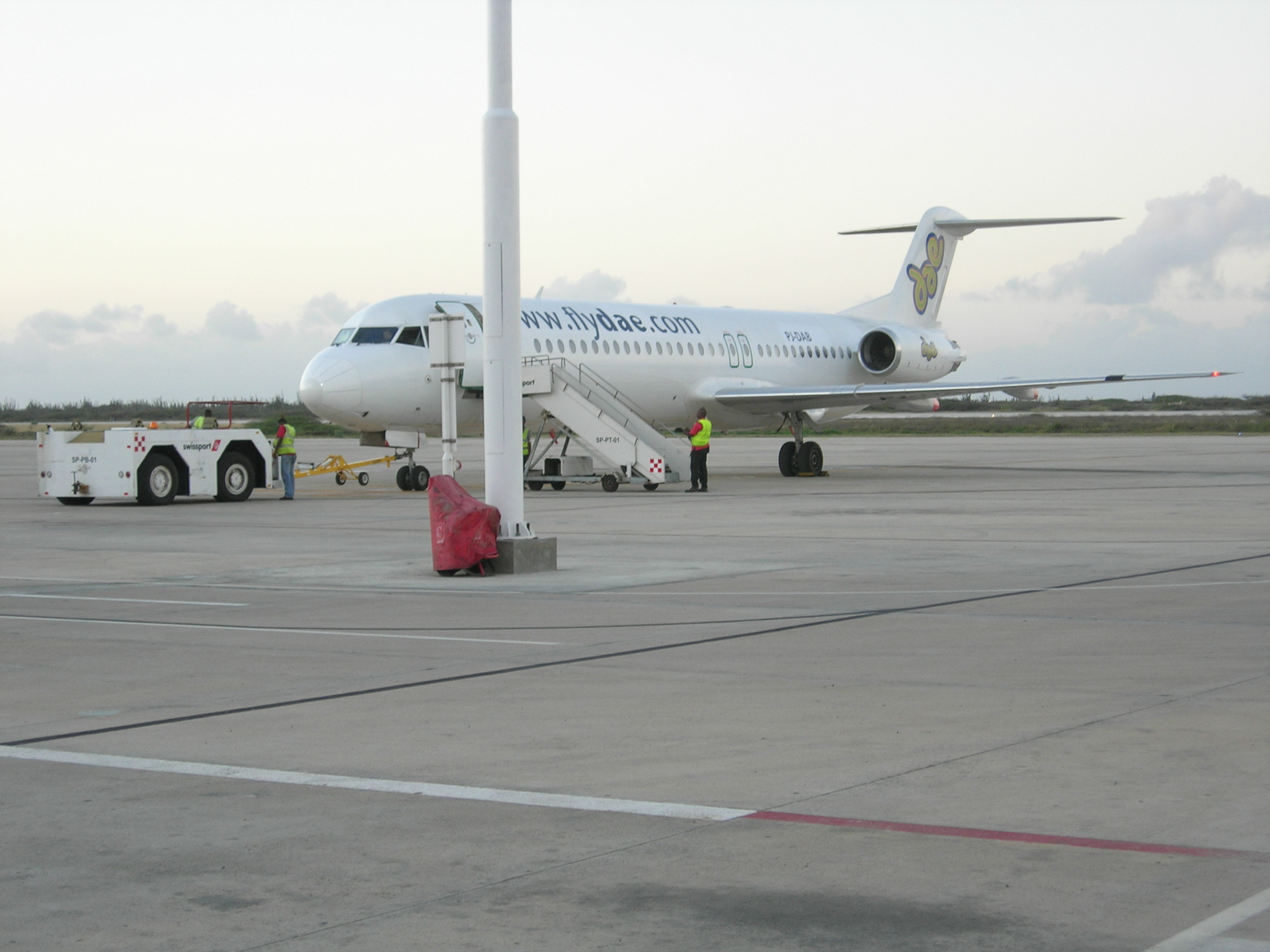
A DAE Fokker 100 parked at Curaçao International Airport in 2007

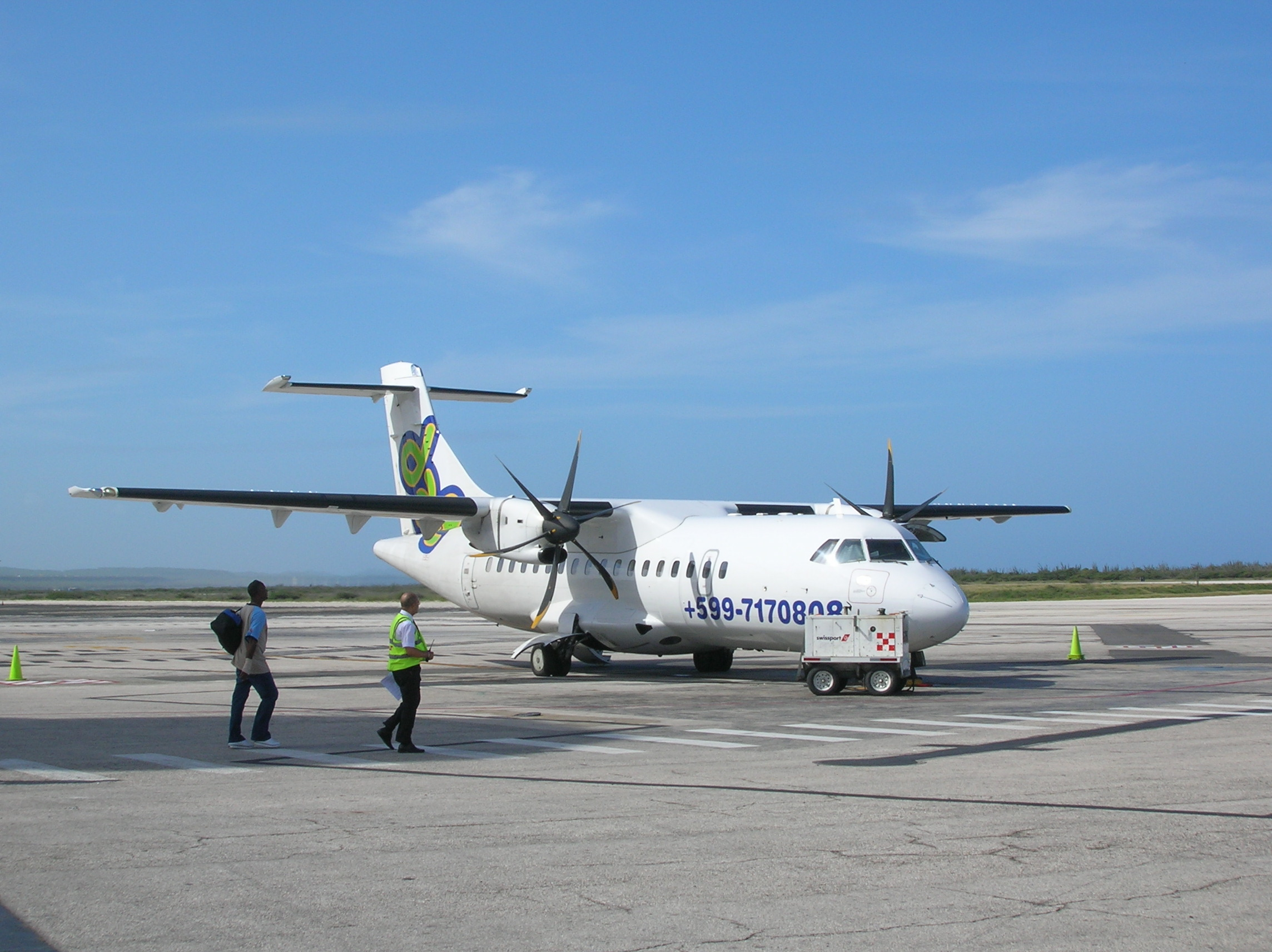
A DAE ATR 42-500 parked at Curaçao International Airport in 2006

Dutch Antilles Express served the following destinations, as of July 2013:

Country	City	Airport	Notes	Refs
Aruba	Oranjestad	Queen Beatrix International Airport	Focus city	
Bonaire	Kralendijk	Flamingo International Airport	Focus city Suspended	
Colombia	Bogotá	El Dorado International Airport		
Curaçao	Willemstad	Curaçao International Airport	Hub	
Dominican Republic	Santo Domingo	Las Américas International Airport		
Haiti	Port-au-Prince	Toussaint Louverture International Airport		
Suriname	Paramaribo	Johan Adolf Pengel International Airport		
Sint Maarten	Philipsburg	Princess Juliana International Airport	Focus city Suspended	
United States	Miami	Miami International Airport	Focus city	
United States	Orlando	Orlando International Airport		
Venezuela	Caracas	Simón Bolívar International Airport	Suspended	
Venezuela	Maracaibo	La Chinita International Airport	Suspended	
Venezuela	Valencia	Arturo Michelena International Airport	Suspended	

== Fleet ==
The Dutch Antilles Express fleet consisted of the following aircraft as of April 2013:

Dutch Antilles Express fleet
Aircraft	In service	Orders	Passengers	Notes
ATR 42-300	1	—	42	
ATR 72-200	1	5	64	Leased from Falcon Air Express
Fokker 100	3	—	100	One under C-Check
McDonnell Douglas MD-83	3	—	152	Operated by Falcon Air Express
Total	8	5		

There were plans to eventually replace their Fokker 100s with newer Airbus A319s and Airbus A320s.

=== Historical fleet ===
Past aircraft of The Dutch Antilles Express consisted of the following:

Dutch Antilles Express retired fleet
Aircraft	Total	Introduced	Retired	Notes
ATR 42-320	3	2005	2012	
ATR 42-500	1	2006	2011	Returned to its lessor

== See also ==
- List of defunct airlines of the Netherlands Antilles
