= BonairExpress =

Dutch Antillean airline

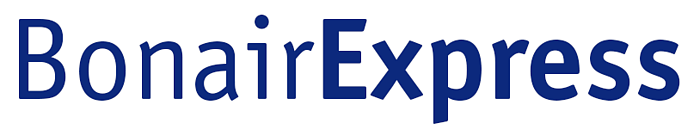
IATA	ICAO	Call sign
9H	BXL	BON EXPRESS
- Founded: April 2003
- Commenced operations: 18 August 2003
- Ceased operations: 30 April 2005
- Hubs: Flamingo International Airport
- Focus cities: Queen Beatrix International Airport; Curaçao International Airport
- Fleet size: 3
- Destinations: 4
- Parent company: Bonair Bellegings Participatie Maatschappij
- Headquarters: Kralendijk, Bonaire
- Website: bonairexel.com

BonairExpress (legally Dutch Eagle Express N.V) was an airline based in Bonaire, a Caribbean island that is a special municipality of the Netherlands. It was the regional airline for the Netherlands Antilles and also acted as a feeder for DutchCaribbeanExel while under the BonairExel brand and part of the ExelAviation Group and later for KLM for its long-haul services to Europe. Its main base was in Bonaire, with focus cities in Aruba and Curaçao. It was merged into Dutch Antilles Express in 2005.

== History ==
The airline was established in 2003 and started operations on 18 August 2003.

The airline was established as a shuttle service by Air Exel Netherlands, a KLM regional partner. It was formerly known as BonairExel and was wholly owned by Bonair Bellegings Participatie Maatschappij. BonairExel formed part of the ExelAviation Group as the initial feeder between the islands of the Netherlands Antilles. In 2005, Bonair Express merged with Curaçao Express and formed Dutch Antilles Express.

Initially, regarding aircraft, those flying under the BonairExel brand were used interisland between Aruba, Bonaire and Curaçao. The one under CuraçaoExel was used on the Bonaire-Curaçao-Sint Maarten route and the one under ArubaExel was planned to be used on the Aruba-Venezuela routes connecting to and from Bonaire/Curaçao but never commenced due to the dismantling of the ExelAviation Group. The Embraer 145 was planned to be used to fly to the United States but was considered too small in size and baggage space.

== Destinations ==
Bonair Express operated the following services (by January 2005):

Country	City	Airport	Notes
Aruba	Oranjestad	Queen Beatrix International Airport	Focus city
Bonaire	Kralendijk	Flamingo International Airport	Hub
Curaçao	Willemstad	Curaçao International Airport	Focus city
Sint Maarten	Philipsburg	Princess Juliana International Airport	

== Fleet ==
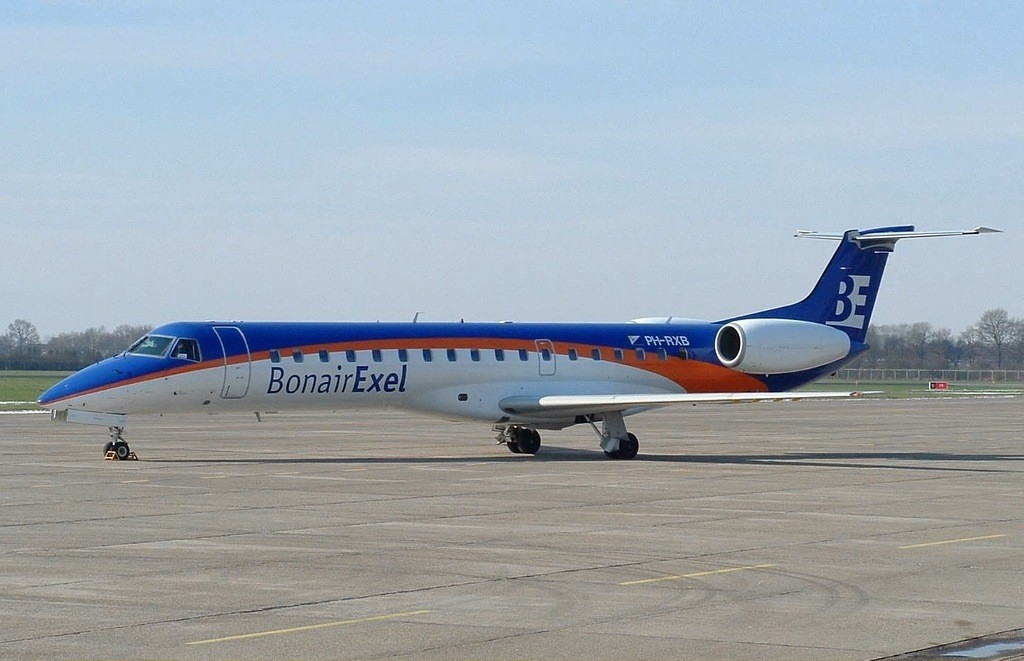
A BonairExel Embraer ERJ 145MP at Dublin Airport in 2004

The Bonaire Express fleet consisted of the following aircraft (at January 2005):

Bonair Express fleet
Aircraft	In service	Orders	Passengers	Notes
ATR 42-320	2	—	46	
Embraer ERJ 145MP	1	—	49	Leased from Air Exel Netherlands
Total	3	—		

== Accidents and incidents ==
- In September 2004, an ATR 42-320 (registered PJ-XLM) had to make an emergency landing due to a small fire that started in the number 2 engine. The plane was flying from Bonaire to Curaçao when the passengers sitting on the left side of the aircraft noticed that smoke was coming out of the engine. The aircraft landed safely at Curaçao International Airport and no one was hurt. A few weeks later, the aircraft was restored and continued flying with DAE until its bankruptcy.

== See also ==
- Curaçao Express
- List of defunct airlines of the Netherlands Antilles
