= List of companies of the Dominican Republic =

Location of the Dominican Republic

The Dominican Republic is a sovereign state occupying the eastern five-eighths of the island of Hispaniola, in the Greater Antilles archipelago in the Caribbean region. The country has the ninth-largest economy in Latin America and is the largest economy in the Caribbean and Central American region. Though long known for agriculture and mining, the economy is now dominated by services. Over the last two decades, the Dominican Republic have been standing out as one of the fastest-growing economies in the Americas - with an average real GDP growth rate of 5.4% between 1992 and 2014. GDP growth in 2014 and 2015 reached 7.3 and 7.0%, respectively, the highest in the Western Hemisphere. In the first half of 2016 the Dominican economy grew 7.4% continuing its trend of rapid economic growth.

For further information on the types of business entities in this country and their abbreviations, see "Business entities in the Dominican Republic".

== Notable firms ==
This list includes notable companies with primary headquarters located in the country. The industry and sector follow the Industry Classification Benchmark taxonomy. Organizations which have ceased operations are included and noted as defunct.

Notable companies Status: P=Private, S=State; A=Active, D=Defunct
| Name | Industry | Sector | Headquarters | Founded | Notes | Status | |
|---|---|---|---|---|---|---|---|
| Aerolíneas Mas | Consumer services | Airlines | Santo Domingo | 2005 | Airline, defunct 2015 | P | D |
| Aeromar Líneas Aéreas Dominicanas | Consumer services | Airlines | Santo Domingo | 1998 | Airline, defunct 2003 | P | D |
| Aeronaves Dominicanas | Consumer services | Airlines | Santo Domingo | 1980 | Charter airline | P | A |
| Air Century | Consumer services | Airlines | Santo Domingo | 1992 | Charter airline | P | A |
| Air Inter Island | Consumer services | Airlines | Punta Cana | 2003 | Charter airline | P | A |
| Banco Intercontinental | Financials | Banks | Santo Domingo | 1986 | Bank, defunct 2003 | P | D |
| Banco León | Financials | Banks | Santo Domingo | 2003 | Bank | P | A |
| Barceló Export Import | Consumer goods | Distillers & vintners | Santo Domingo | 1930 | Distilled beverages | P | A |
| J. Armando Bermúdez & Co. | Consumer goods | Distillers & vintners | Santiago de los Caballeros | 1852 | Distilled beverages | P | A |
| Brugal & Cía. | Consumer goods | Distillers & vintners | Puerto Plata | 1888 | Distilled beverages | P | A |
| Central Bank of the Dominican Republic | Financials | Banks | Santo Domingo | 1962 | Central bank | S | A |
| Cervecería Nacional Dominicana | Consumer goods | Brewers | Santo Domingo | 1929 | Brewery | P | A |
| Claro República Dominicana | Telecommunications | Fixed line telecommunications | Santo Domingo | 1930 | Wireline and wireless | P | A |
| Dominicana de Aviación | Consumer services | Airlines | Santo Domingo | 1944 | Airline, defunct 1999 | P | D |
| Grupo Corripio | Conglomerates | - | Santo Domingo | 1917 | Media, industrials, financials | P | A |
| Grupo León Jimenes | Consumer goods | Brewers | Santo Domingo | 1903 | Brewing | P | A |
| Grupo Vimenca | Financials | Banks | Santo Domingo | 1950 | Banking, financial services | P | A |
| Metaldom | Industrials | Steel | Santo Domingo | 1968 | Steel | P | A |
| MATASA | Consumer goods | Tobacco | Santiago de los Caballeros | 1974 | Cigars | P | A |
| Royal Lavanderia | Consumer services | Specialized consumer services | Santo Domingo | 1995 | Dry cleaning | P | A |
| Servicios Aéreos Profesionales | Consumer services | Airlines | Santo Domingo | 1981 | Airline | P | A |
| Tricom S.A. | Telecommunications | Fixed line telecommunications | Santo Domingo | 1988 | Landlines | P | A |
| Trilogy Dominicana (Viva) | Telecommunications | Mobile telecommunications | Santo Domingo | 1883 | Mobile network | P | A |

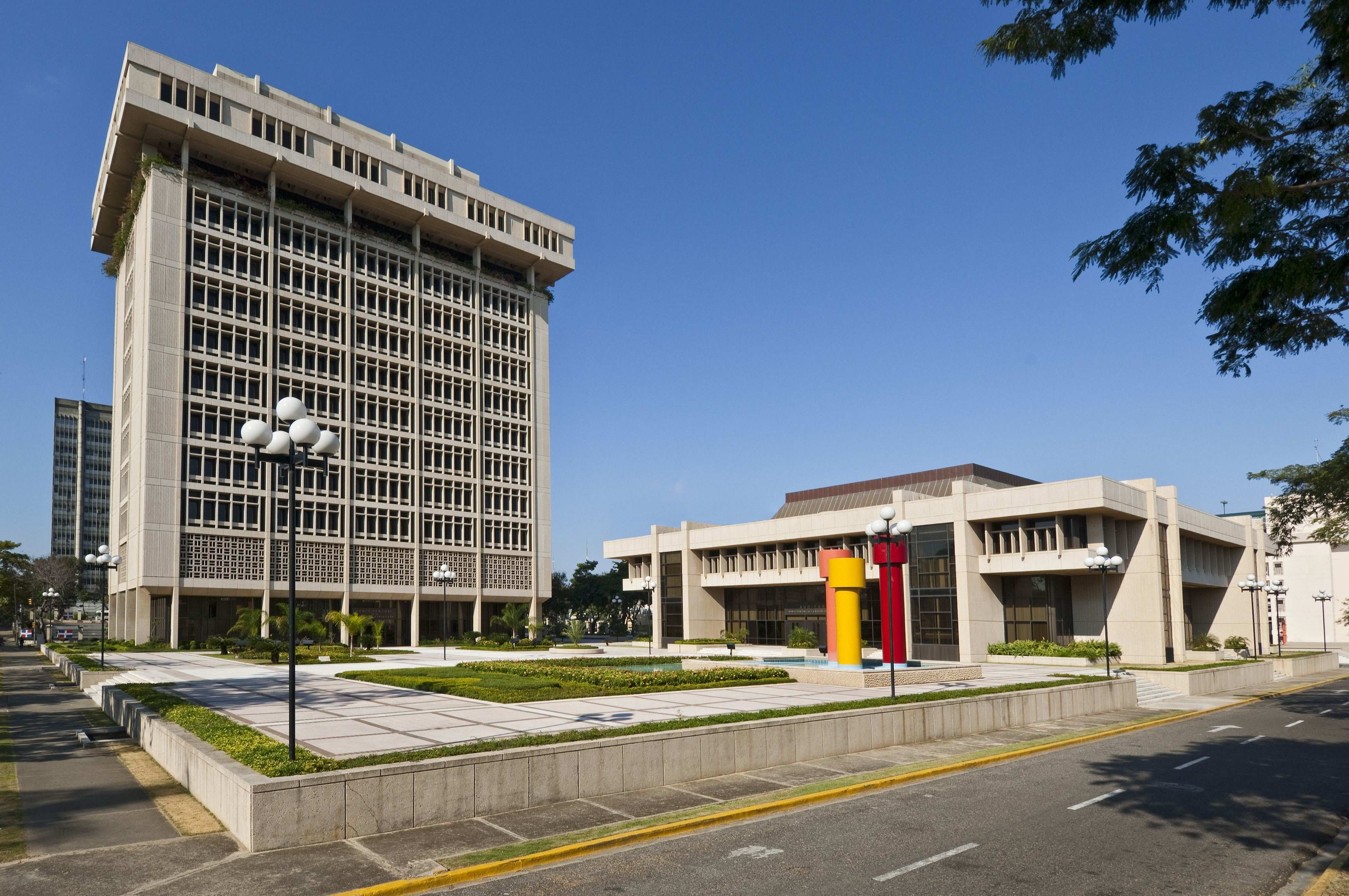
The Central Bank of the Dominican Republic in Santo Domingo.

Brugal bottling plant in Puerto Plata.

== See also ==
- List of airlines of the Dominican Republic
- List of banks in the Dominican Republic
