= List of airline codes (H) =

This is a list of all airline codes. The table lists the IATA airline designators, the ICAO airline designators and the airline call signs (telephony designator). Historical assignments are also included for completeness.

== Codes ==
Airline codes
IATA	ICAO	Airline	Call sign	Country	Comments
H4		Héli Sécurité Helicopter Airlines		France	
EO	ALX	Hewa Bora Airways	ALLCONGO	Democratic Republic of the Congo	
	AHT	HTA Helicopteros	HELIAPRA	Portugal	
	ETI	H-Bird Aviation Services AB	JETHAWK	Sweden	
	HSN	H.S.AVIATION CO., LTD.	H.S.AVIATION	Thailand	
	HAY	Hamburg Airways	HAMBURG AIRWAYS	Germany	defunct
	HCK	Heli-Charter	HELI-CHARTER	United Kingdom	
	HTB	Helix-Craft Aviation	HELIX-CRAFT	Panama	2014
	HAF	Hellenic Air Force	HELLENIC AIR FORCE	Greece	
	HRN	Heron Luftfahrt	HERONAIR	Germany	
	HYP	Hyperion Aviation	HYPERION	Malta	
	HFM	Hi Fly Malta	MOONRAKER	Malta	
A5	HOP	Hop!	AIR HOP	France	
	HLA	HC Airlines	HEAVYLIFT	United Kingdom	
	HWD	HPM Investments	FLITEWISE	United Kingdom	
	KTR	HT Helikoptertransport	COPTER TRANS	Sweden	
		Hacienda Airlines		United States	defunct - 1957 to July 10, 1962
	FMS	Hadison Aviation	HADI	United States	
H6	HAG	Hageland Aviation Services	HAGELAND	United States	
	POW	Hagondale Limited	AIRNET	United Kingdom	
HR	HHN	Hahn Air	ROOSTER	Germany	
H1		Hahn Air Systems		Germany	
HU	CHH	Hainan Airlines	HAINAN	China	
1R		Hainan Phoenix Information Systems		China	
	HLS	Haiti Air Freight		Haiti	
2T	HAM	Haiti Ambassador Airlines		Haiti	
	HTI	Haiti International Air	HAITI INTERNATIONAL	Haiti	
	HRB	Haiti International Airline	HAITI AIRLINE	Haiti	
	HNR	Haiti National Airlines (HANA)	HANAIR	Haiti	
	HTN	Haiti North Airline		Haiti	
	HTC	Haiti Trans Air	HAITI TRANSAIR	Haiti	
	HBC	Haitian Aviation Line	HALISA	Haiti	
	HAJ	Hajvairy Airlines	HAJVAIRY	Pakistan	
	HKL	Hak Air	HAK AIRLINE	Nigeria	
	HLH	Hala Air	HALA AIR	Sudan	
	HCV	Halcyonair	CREOLE	Cape Verde	
4R	HHI	Hamburg International	HAMBURG JET	Germany	
	HJL	Hamlin Jet	BIZJET	United Kingdom	
	HMM	Hamra Air	HAMRA	United Arab Emirates	
	WVA	Hand D Aviation	WABASH VALLEY	United States	
	HGR	Hangar 8	HANG	United Kingdom	
	HGD	Hangard Aviation	HANGARD	Mongolia	
	HAN	Hansung Airlines	HANSUNG AIR	Republic of Korea	
X3	HLX	Hapag-Lloyd Express	YELLOW CAB	Germany	Became TUI fly Deutschland in 2007
HF	HLF	Hapagfly	HAPAG LLOYD	Germany	Became TUI fly Deutschland in 2007
HB	HAR	Harbor Airlines	HARBOR	United States	
HQ	HMY	Harmony Airways	HARMONY	Canada	
	NBR	Haughey Air	NORBROOK	United Kingdom	
	PYN	Haverfordwest Air Charter Services	POYSTON	United Kingdom	
	HAV	Havilah Air Services	HAVILAH	Nigeria	
HA	HAL	Hawaiian Airlines	HAWAIIAN	United States	
HP		Hawaiian Pacific Airlines		United States	defunct
	HKR	Hawk Air	AIR HAW	Argentina	
	HMX	Hawk De Mexico	HAWK MEXICO	Mexico	
BH		Hawkair		Canada	defunct since 2016
	HKI	Hawkaire	HAWKEYE	United States	
	HZL	Hazelton Airlines	HAZELTON	Australia	Defunct.
HN	HVY	Heavylift Cargo Airlines	HEAVY CARGO	Australia	
	HVL	Heavylift International	HEAVYLIFT INTERNATIONAL	United Arab Emirates	
NS	HBH	Hebei Airlines	HEBEI AIR	China	
	HDC	Helcopteros De Cataluna	HELICATALUNA	Spain	
	HCB	Helenair (Barbados)	HELEN	Barbados	
	HCL	Helenair Corporation	HELENCORP	Saint Lucia	
	HHP	Helenia Helicopter Service	HELENIA	Denmark	
	HLR	Heli Air Services	HELI BULGARIA	Bulgaria	
	ALJ	Heli Ambulance Team	ALPIN HELI	Austria	
	HEB	Heli Bernina	HELIBERNINA	Switzerland	
	HFR	Heli France	HELIFRANCE	France	
	HYH	Heli Hungary	HELIHUNGARY	Hungary	
	HLM	Heli Medwest De Mexico	HELIMIDWEST	Mexico	
	HLI	Heli Securite	HELI SAINT-TROPEZ	France	
	HTP	Heli Trip	HELI TRIP	Mexico	
	HLU	Heli Union Heli Prestations	HELI UNION	France	
	MCM	Heli-Air-Monaco	HELI AIR	Monaco	
	HHE	Heli-Holland	HELI HOLLAND	Netherlands	
	HRA	Heli-Iberica	ERICA	Spain	
	HIF	Heli-Iberica Fotogrametria	HIFSA	Spain	
	HIG	Heli-Inter Guyane	INTER GUYANNE	France	
	HLK	Heli-Link	HELI-LINK	Switzerland	
	HMC	Heliamerica De Mexico	HELIAMERICA	Mexico	
	HEA	Heliavia-Transporte Aéreo	HELIAVIA	Portugal	
	CDY	Heliaviation Limited	CADDY	United Kingdom	
	HIB	Helibravo Aviacao	HELIBRAVO	Portugal	
	HLC	Helicap	HELICAP	France	
	COV	Helicentre Coventry	HELICENTRE	United Kingdom	
	HEL	Helicol	HELICOL	Colombia	
	HCP	Helicopter	HELI CZECH	Czech Republic	
	JKY	Helicopter & Aviation Services	JOCKEY	United Kingdom	
	MVK	Helicopter Training & Hire	MAVRIK	United Kingdom	
	HAP	Helicopteros Aero Personal	HELIPERSONAL	Mexico	
	HAA	Helicopteros Agroforestal	AGROFORESTAL	Chile	
	HNT	Helicopteros Internacionales	HELICOP INTER	Mexico	
	HEN	Helicópteros Y Vehículos Nacionales Aéreos	HELINAC	Mexico	
	HHH	Helicsa	HELICSA	Spain	
JB	JBA	Helijet	HELIJET	Canada	
	HDR	Helikopterdrift	HELIDRIFT	Norway	
	SCO	Helikopterservice Euro Air	SWEDCOPTER	Sweden	
	OCE	Heliocean	HELIOCEAN	France	
ZU	HCY	Helios Airways	HELIOS	Cyprus	defunct since 7 November 2006
	HLP	Helipistas	HELIPISTAS	Spain	
	HPL	Heliportugal	HELIPORTUGAL	Portugal	
	HEC	Heliservicio Campeche	HELICAMPECHE	Mexico	
	HSU	Helisul	HELIS	Portugal	
	HSI	Heliswiss	HELISWISS	Switzerland	
	HLT	Helitafe	HELITAFE	Mexico	
	HIT	Helitalia	HELITALIA	Italy	
	OFA	Helitaxi Ofavi	OFAVI	Mexico	
	HLT	Helitours	HELITOURS	Sri Lanka	
9I	HTA	Helitrans	SCANBIRD	Norway	
	HTS	Helitrans Air Service	HELITRANS	United States	
	HLW	Heliworks	HELIWORKS	Chile	
HJ	HEJ	Hellas Jet	HELLAS JET	Greece	ceased operation in 2010
HW	FHE	Hello	FLYHELLO	Switzerland	
	HLG	Helog	HELOG	Switzerland	
2L	OAW	Helvetic Airways	HELVETIC	Switzerland	
	HMS	Hemus Air	HEMUS AIR	Bulgaria	
	HAC	Henebury Aviation		Australia	
	SSH	Heritage Flight (Valley Air Services)	SNOWSHOE	United States	
	MRX	Herman's Markair Express	SPEEDMARK	United States	
	HED	Heritage Aviation Developments	FLAPJACK	United Kingdom	
UD	HER	Hex'Air	HEX AIRLINE	France	
	HHS	Hi-Jet Helicopter Services	HIJET	Suriname	
5K	HFY	Hi Fly	SKY FLYER	Portugal	
	HLB	High-Line Airways	HIGH-LINE	Canada	
	HWY	Highland Airways	HIWAY	United Kingdom	
H9	HIM	Himalaya Airlines	HIMALAYA	Nepal	
H7	HYM	HiSky	SKY MOLDOVA	Moldova	
H4	HYS	HiSky Europe	SKY EUROPE	Romania	
	HSH	Hispánica de Aviación	HASA	Spain	
	HIS	Hispaniola Airways	HISPANIOLA	Dominican Republic	
VM	VMS	His Majesty King Maha Vajiralongkorn	VICTOR MIKE	Thailand	holding airline, renamed on his accession.
	HGA	Hogan Air	HOGAN AIR	United States	
	NTH	Hokkaido Air System	NORTH AIR	Japan	
	ABH	Hokuriki-Koukuu Company		Japan	
H5	HOA	Hola Airlines	HOLA	Spain	
	HIN	Holding International Group	HOLDING GROUP	Mexico	
	HOL	Holiday Airlines (US Airline)	HOLIDAY	United States	
HC	HCC	Holidays Czech Airlines	CZECH HOLIDAYS	Czech Republic	
	HTR	Holstenair Lubeck	HOLSTEN	Germany	
	HMV	Homac Aviation	HOMAC	Luxembourg	
	HAS	Honduras Airlines	HONDURAS AIR	Honduras	
HX	CRK	Hong Kong Airlines	BAUHINIA	Hong Kong	
RH	HKC	Hong Kong Air Cargo	MASCOT	Hong Kong	
UO	HKE	Hong Kong Express Airways	HONGKONG SHUTTLE	Hong Kong	
A6	HTU	Hongtu Airlines	HONGLAND	China	
	HEX	Honiara Cargo Express	HONIARA CARGO	Solomon Islands	
H1		Hooters Air	Hooters Air	United States	The airline was established in 2003 and started operations on March 6, 2003. On April 17, 2006, Hooters Air ceased operations, halting scheduled Public Charter service and refunding tickets.
	HPJ	Hop-A-Jet	HOPA-JET	United States	
HH		Hope Air	HOPE AIR	Canada	
QX	QXE	Horizon Air	HORIZON AIR	United States	
	KOK	Horizon Air Service	KOKO	United States	
	HSM	Horizon Air for Transport and Training	ALOFUKAIR	Libya	
	HOR	Horizon Air-Taxi	HORIZON	Switzerland	
BN	HZA	Horizon Airlines	HORIZON	Australia	defunct
	HPS	Horizon Plus	HORIZON PLUS	Bangladesh	
	HUD	Horizons Unlimited	HUD	United States	
	HOZ	Horizontes Aéreos	HORIZONTES AEREOS	Mexico	
	HDI	Hoteles Dinamicos	DINAMICOS	Mexico	
	HHO	Houston Helicopters	HOUSTON HELI	United States	
	GGV	Houston Jet Services	GREGG AIR	Austria	
	OZU	Hozu-Avia	HOZAVIA	Kazakhstan	
	HUB	Hub Airlines	HUB	United States	
	HUS	Huessler Air Service	HUESSLER	United States	
	GMH	Hughes Aircraft Company	HUGHES EXPRESS	United States	
HJ	USW	HumoAir	AKSAR	Uzbekistan	
	HUV	Hunair Hungarian Airlines	SILVER EAGLE	Hungary	
	HUF	Hungarian Air Force	HUNGARIAN AIRFORCE	Hungary	
HW	UBD	FlyErbil	HAWLER	Iraqi Kurdistan	
	HYA	Hyack Air	HYACK	Canada	
	HYC	Hydro Air Flight Operations	HYDRO CARGO	South Africa	
	HYD	Hydro-Québec	HYDRO	Canada	
	HKB	Hawker Beechcraft	CLASSIC	United States	
MR	MML	Hunnu Air	TRANS MONGOLIA	Mongolia	
	RPX	HD Air Ltd	RAPEX	United Kingdom	
	SRD	HM Coastguard	COASTGUARD	United Kingdom	
	SRG	HM Coastguard	RESCUE	United Kingdom	Search and Rescue
	WHR	Hummingbird Helicopter Service	WHIRLEYBIRD	United States	
E2	HFA	Air Haifa	AIR HAIFA	Israel	

== IATA Traffic Conference Areas ==
The International Air Transport Association (IATA) divides the world into three areas called the Traffic Conference Areas (TCAs) for air travel purposes. These areas are used to define geographical boundaries for fare construction and other industry-related practices:

- Traffic Conference Area 1 (TC1) – this area includes the Americas, encompassing North America (the Caribbean, Central America, and Northern America) and South America.
- Traffic Conference Area 2 (TC2) – this area includes the EMEA region, encompassing Europe, the Middle East, and Africa (North Africa and Sub-Saharan Africa).
- Traffic Conference Area 3 (TC3) – this area includes the Asia–Pacific region, encompassing the rest of Asia (Central Asia, East Asia, North Asia, South Asia, and Southeast Asia) and Oceania.

Essentially, TC1 covers the "New World", while TC2 and TC3 together cover the "Old World" (Africa-Eurasia) and the "Land Down Under".

== See also ==
- IATA airport code
- ICAO airport code
