= List of airlines of the Dominican Republic =

This is a list of airlines operating in the Dominican Republic.

== Active ==
Airline	Image	IATA	ICAO	Callsign	Founded	Notes
Air Century		Y2	CEY	CENTURYFLIGHT	1992	
Air Inter Island					2003	
Arajet		DW	DWI	DOMINICAN	2021	Flag carrier.
RED Air		L5	REA	RED DOMINICANA	2020	
ReefJet					2013	
Sky High Aviation Services		DO	SHH	SKY HIGH	2012	
Servicios Aéreos GECA		D6	GCA	AEROGECA	2010	
Volo		DC	OLO	VOLODO	1980	Created with the name Aeronaves Dominicanas DBA Volo Airways (2024)

== Defunct ==
Airline	Image	IATA	ICAO	Callsign	Founded	Ceased operations	Notes
Aero Continente Dominicana		9D	CND	CONDOMINICANA	2001	2003	
Aerochago		G3	AHG	AEROCHAGO	1983	2004	
ADSA - Aérolineas Dominicanas		SS			1978	2001	Merged with Dominair.
Aerolíneas Mas		N3	MAF	AEROMAS	2005	2016	Merged into Sunrise Airways.
Aerolineas Mundo			MUQ		1986	1993	
Aeromar Líneas Aéreas Dominicanas		BQ	ROM	BRAVO QUEBEC	1962	2003	
Aeronaves Dominicanas					1980	2024	Renamed to Volo.
Aerotim Cargo			ATI		1993	1994	
Aerotours Dominicana			ATD	AEROTOURS	1973	1983	Renamed to Aerochago.
Aerovías Quisqueyana		QQ	QAS	QUISQUEYANA	1962	1978	
Agro Air International					1989	2001	
Air Ambar			AMY	AIR AMBAR	1995	1996	
Air Atlantic Dominicana		LU	ADC	ATLAN-DOMINICAN	1996	1999	
Air Dominicana		ED	RDO	AIRDOM	2007	2009	Never launched.
Air Santo Domingo		EX	SDO	AERO DOMINGO	1998	2005	Merged into SAP.
Alas del Caribe		YV			1967	1979	
ALAS de Transporte Internacional		RW			1987	1993	
Alas Nacionales			ALW	ALAS NACIONALES; DOMINICANAS	1995	1996	
Antillas Air Cargo				ANTILLASAIR	1986	1996	
Antillana de Navegación Aérea			SUN		1989	1990	
APA International Air		7P	APY	APA INTERNACIONAL	1980	2001	
Caribair		B9	CBC	CARIBAIR	1962	2009	
Caribbean Air Sign			CAS		2006	2010	Began as FlyTortuga.
Dominair		YU	ADM	DOMINAIR	1974	2007	
Dominicana de Aviación		DO	DOA	DOMINICANA	1944	1999	
Dominican Wings		DM	DWI	DOMINICAN	2014	2021	Rebranded as AraJet.
Hispaniola Airways		ZS	HIS	HISPANIOLA	1981	2000	
LAN Dominicana		4M	LNC	LANCANA	2003	2005	Merged back into LAN Airlines.
PAWA Dominicana		7N	PWD	PAWA	2002	2018	
Queen Air		OQ	QNA	QUEEN AIR	1998	1999	
Servicios Aéreos Profesionales (SAP)		5S	PSV	PROSERVICIOS	1981	2020(?)	
Sky Cana		RD	SNA	CANA	2021	2024	Virtual airline.
Sol Dominicana Airlines		DA	SDA	SOL AIRLINES	2007	2009	
Taino Airlines			TIN	TAINO	1977	2006	
Trans Dominican Airways			TDO	TRADO	1977	1997	
Viva Air Dominicana		6E		VIVA AIR	2005	2008	
VolAir				VOLAIR	2003	2011	
West Indian Aerial Express					1927	1928	Absorbed by Pan Am.

== See also ==
- List of airlines of the Americas
- List of defunct airlines of the Americas
- List of airports in the Dominican Republic
