= Air Santo Domingo =

Flag carrier of the Dominican Republic (1996–2005)

IATA	ICAO	Call sign
EX	SDO	-
- Founded: 1996
- Ceased operations: 2005
- Hubs: Las Américas International Airport
- Fleet size: 1
- Parent company: SAP Group
- Key people: Miguel Patin Hernandez (Sales Director)
- Website: www.airsantodomingo.net

Air Santo Domingo (legally Aerolíneas Santo Domingo, S.A.) was the flag carrier airline based in Santo Domingo, Dominican Republic. It operated scheduled domestic services and flights to Haiti and Puerto Rico. It wet-leased additional aircraft from Servicios Aéreos Profesionales, which it used for ad hoc, on demand charter services to the United States. Founded in 1996, it operated scheduled domestic services within the Dominican Republic as well as regional flights to neighboring Caribbean destinations. Its main base was La Isabela International Airport in Santo Domingo. The airline primarily used small aircraft such as the BAe Jetstream 32 and later operated a Boeing 727 under wet lease agreements. Air Santo Domingo ceased operations in the mid-2000s.

== History ==
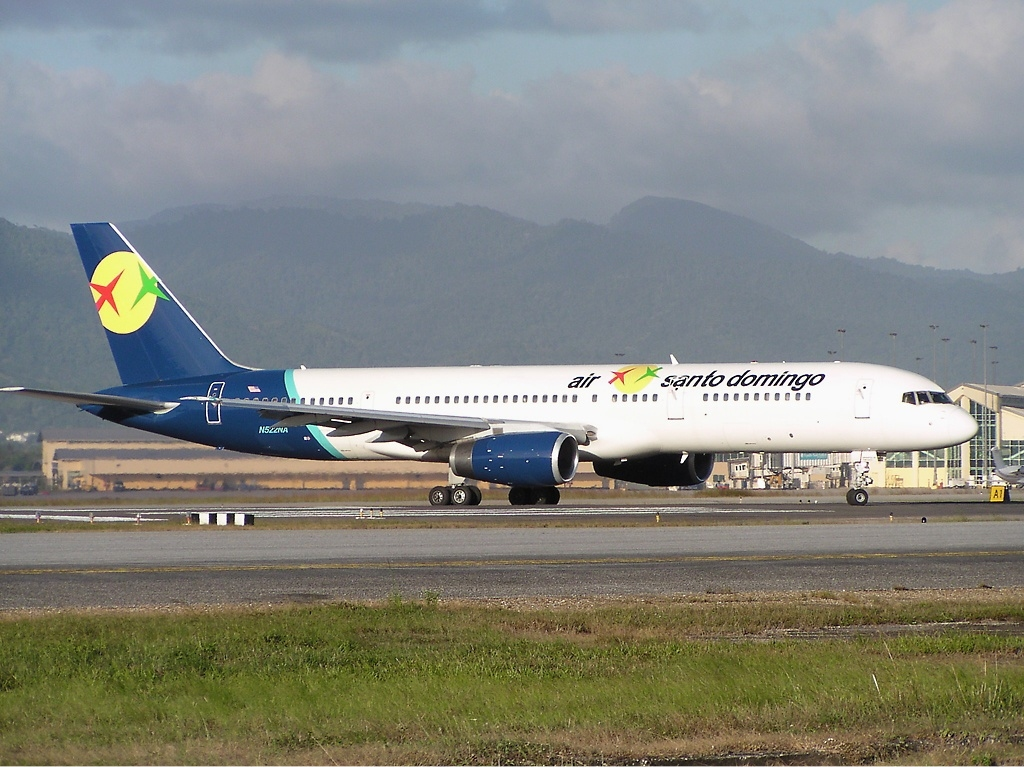
Former Air Santo Domingo Boeing 757-200 at Port of Spain in 2004

The airline was established in 1996, wholly owned by Servicios Aéreos Profesionales (SAP). It flew to certain destinations in the Caribbean, to the United States and to Puerto Rico, covering routes to John F. Kennedy International Airport and Luis Muñoz Marín International Airport with one Boeing 727-200 and one Boeing 757-200 leased from TransMeridian Airlines. In 2005, Air Santo Domingo was merged into SAP.

As of 2020, the airline currently undertaking expansion plans, with SAP Group handling all operations for Air Santo Domingo.

== Fleet ==
=== Current fleet ===
As of 2021, Air Santo Domingo owns a single BAe Jetstream 32 (registered HI856) used for charter flights.

=== Former fleet ===
Over the years, the airline operated the following types:

- 1 Beechcraft 1900 Leased from SAP Air
- 2 Boeing 727-200 Leased from TransMeridian Airlines
- 1 Boeing 757-200 Leased from TransMeridian Airlines
- 1 Cessna 208 Caravan Operated by SAP Air
- 4 Let L-410 UVP-E One owned, the others were leased from SAP Air
- 1 Saab 340B Operated by SAP Air
- 2 Short 360 Leased from SAP Air

== See also ==
- List of airlines of the Dominican Republic
