= Aerolíneas =

Aerolíneas is Spanish for "airlines". It may refer to:

- Aerolíneas Argentinas, Argentine airline
- Aerolíneas de El Salvador, defunct El Salvadoran airline
- Aerolíneas de Baleares, defunct Spanish airline
- Aerolíneas Ejecutivas, Mexican executive travel operator
- Aerolineas Estelar, Venezuelan airline
- Aerolíneas Internacionales, defunct Mexican airline
- Aerolíneas Mas, defunct Dominican Republican airline
- Aerolíneas Paraguayas, defunct Paraguayan airline
- Aerolíneas Peruanas, defunct Peruvian airline
- Aerolíneas Sosa, Honduran airline
- ABC Aerolíneas, Mexican airline also known as Interjet
- Avolar Aerolíneas, defunct Mexican airline
- TAR Aerolíneas, Mexican airline
