= Dominair =

Airline of the Dominican Republic, 1990–2007

Dominair, S.A.
IATA	ICAO	Call sign
YU	ADM	DOMINAIR
- Founded: 1974
- Ceased operations: 2007
- Hubs: Cibao International Airport
- Secondary hubs: Luis Muñoz Marín International Airport (until 1999)
- Focus cities: Toussaint Louverture International Airport
- Fleet size: 2
- Destinations: 2
- Parent company: Líneas Dominicanas, Inc.
- Headquarters: Santiago de los Caballeros, Dominican Republic

Dominair, S.A. was a passenger regional airline based in Santiago de los Caballeros, Dominican Republic, founded by Poppy Bermúdez. that offered flights to Port-au-Prince, Haiti, until 2007. Before that, it was a popular airline with regular flights to San Juan, Puerto Rico, using two de Havilland Canada Dash 8. The airline is now defunct and previously only flew to Port-au-Prince and had a fleet composed of two leased L-410 Turbolet.

On 8 February 1989, Independent Air Flight 1851 crashed in the Azores while operating a charter for Dominair from Bergamo, Italy to the Dominican Republic with the loss of 145 lives.

== Fleet ==
- 2 L-410 Turbolet (Leased from SAP Air)

Previously:

- 1 Martin 404 (Owned HI-334)
- 2 de Havilland Canada Dash 8 (Leased from LIAT)
- 3 de Havilland Canada Dash 8 (Operated by LIAT)

== See also ==
- List of defunct airlines of the Dominican Republic
