= SKYhigh Dominicana =

Dominican airline

Sky High Aviation Services S.A.
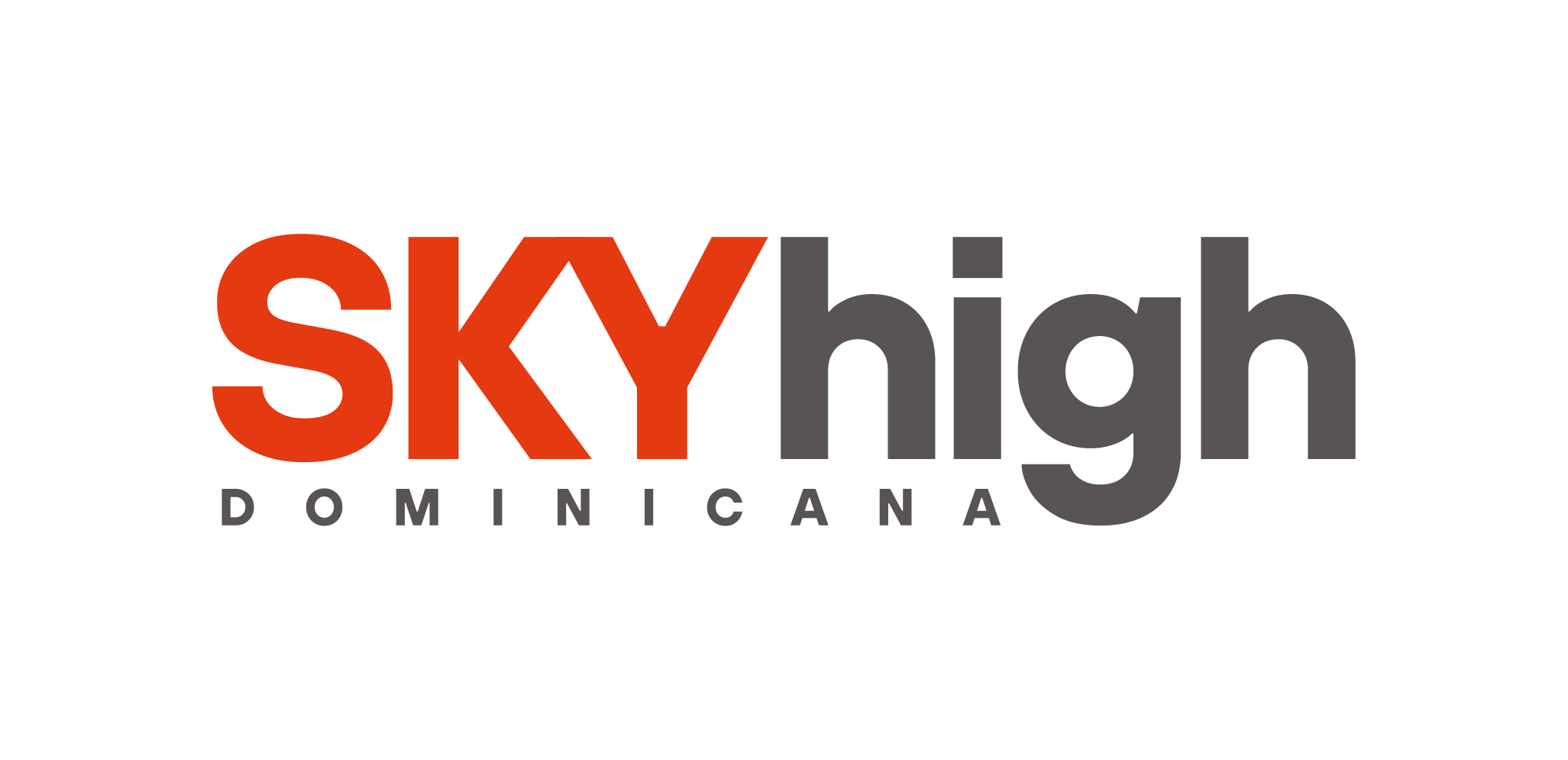

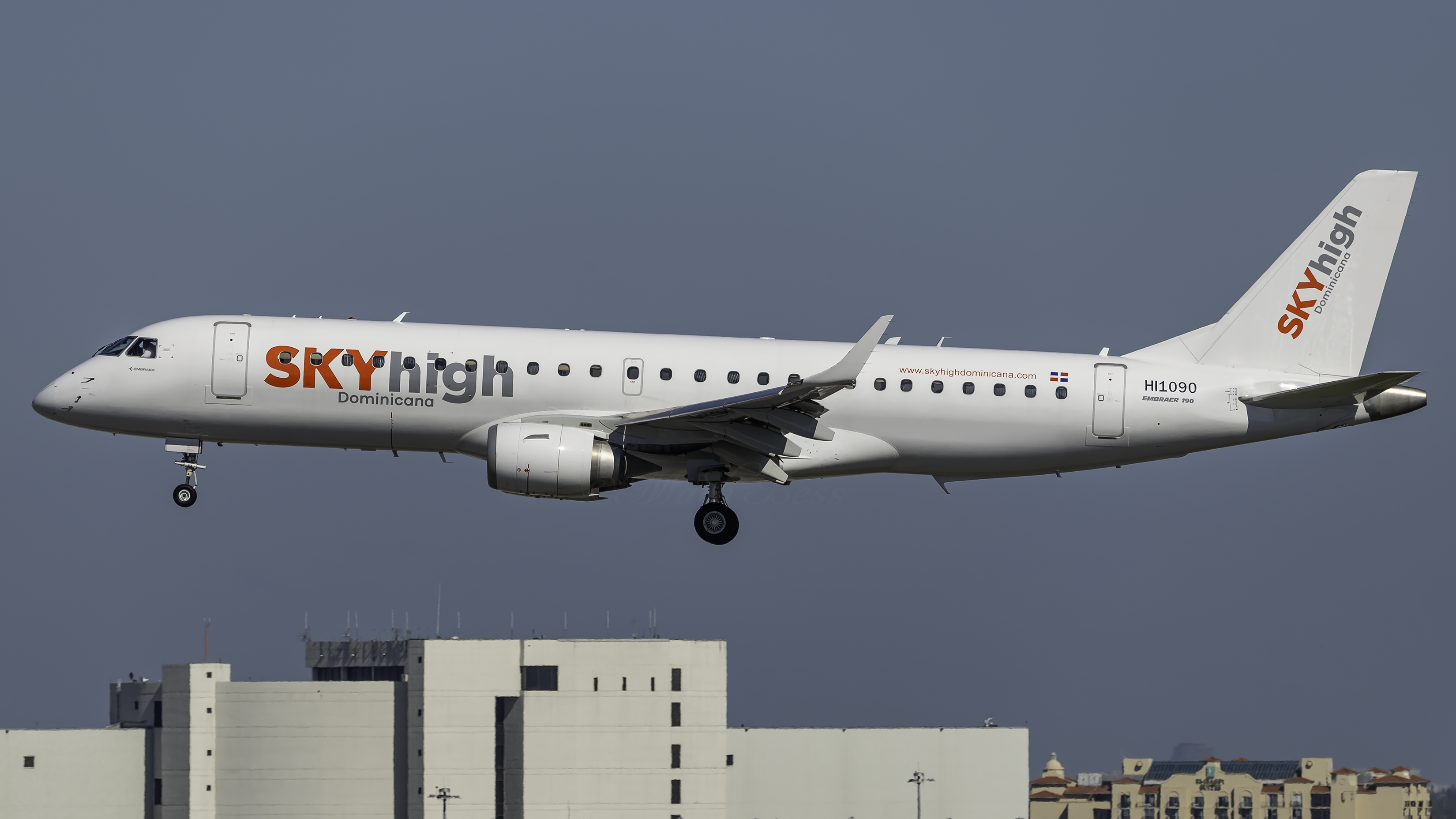
- SKYhigh Dominicana Embraer 190
IATA	ICAO	Call sign
DO	SHH	SKY HIGH
- Founded: 2012
- Commenced operations: October 5, 2012
- AOC #: SKYA022A
- Hubs: Santo Domingo–Las Américas
- Focus cities: Miami
- Fleet size: 8
- Destinations: 17
- Headquarters: Edificio Corporativo 2015, piso 14, Piantini, Santo Domingo, Dominican Republic
- Key people: Juan Bautista Chamizo (President & CEO)
- Website: skyhighdo.com

Sky High Aviation Services S.A., operating as SKYhigh Dominicana, is an airline based in the Dominican Republic. It operates scheduled flights in the Caribbean.

== Destinations ==
SKYhigh operates scheduled and charter flights from the Dominican Republic to different Caribbean destinations. The airline currently operates scheduled flights in the Caribbean, with charter flights available and future destinations expected.

Country / region	City	Airport	Notes	Refs
Anguilla	The Valley	Clayton J. Lloyd International Airport		
Antigua and Barbuda	Osbourn	V. C. Bird International Airport		
Bonaire	Kralendijk	Flamingo International Airport		
Cuba	Havana	José Martí International Airport		
Cuba	Santiago de Cuba	Antonio Maceo Airport		
Curaçao	Willemstad	Curaçao International Airport		
Dominican Republic	Punta Cana	Punta Cana International Airport		
Dominican Republic	Santo Domingo	Las Américas International Airport	Hub	
Guadeloupe	Pointe-à-Pitre	Pointe-à-Pitre International Airport		
Guyana	Georgetown	Cheddi Jagan International Airport		
Martinique	Fort-de-France	Martinique Aimé Césaire International Airport		
Suriname	Paramaribo	Johan Adolf Pengel International Airport		
Saint Kitts and Nevis	Basseterre	Robert L. Bradshaw International Airport		
United States	Miami	Miami International Airport	Focus city	
United States	Providence	Rhode Island T. F. Green International Airport	Seasonal	
United States Virgin Islands	Saint Croix	Henry E. Rohlsen Airport	Seasonal	
United States Virgin Islands	Saint Thomas	Cyril E. King Airport		

== Fleet ==
=== Current ===
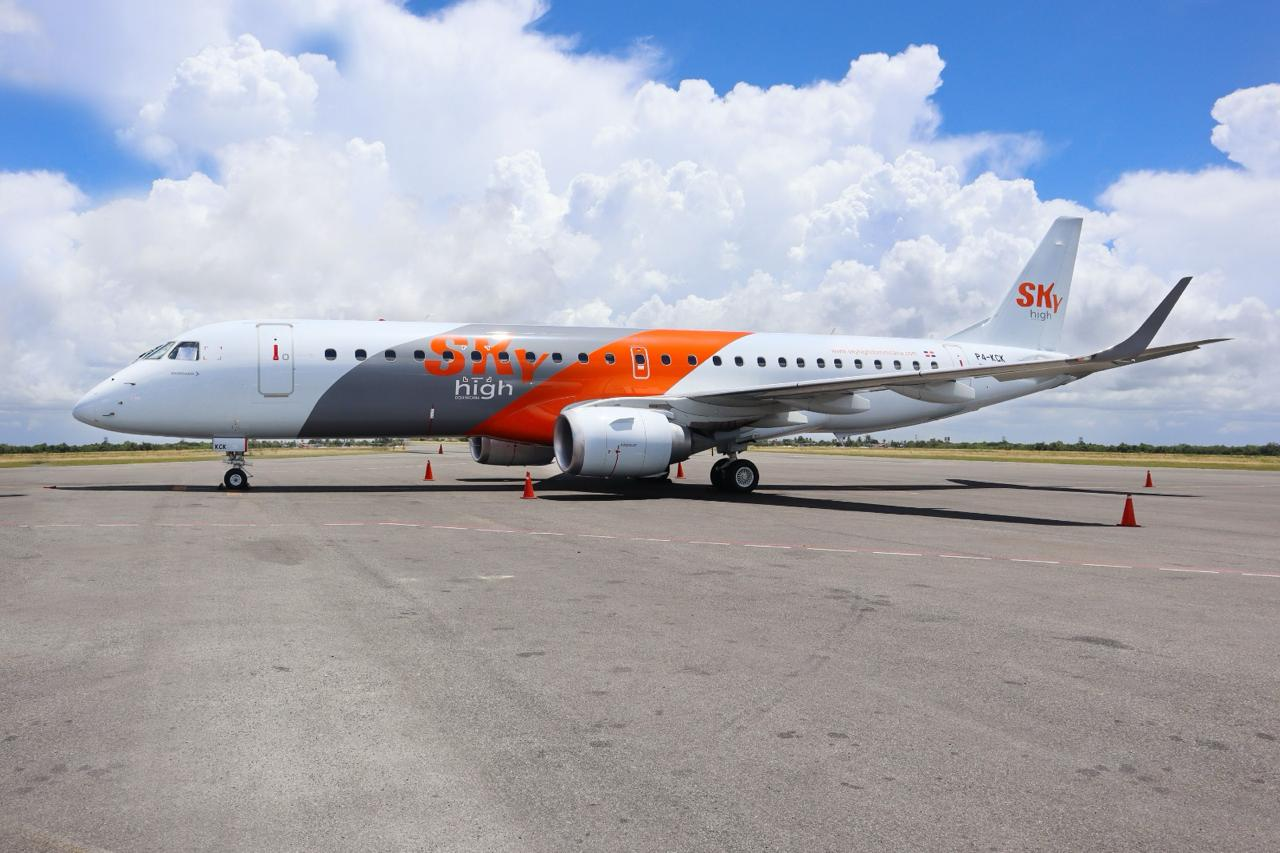
SKYhigh Embraer 190

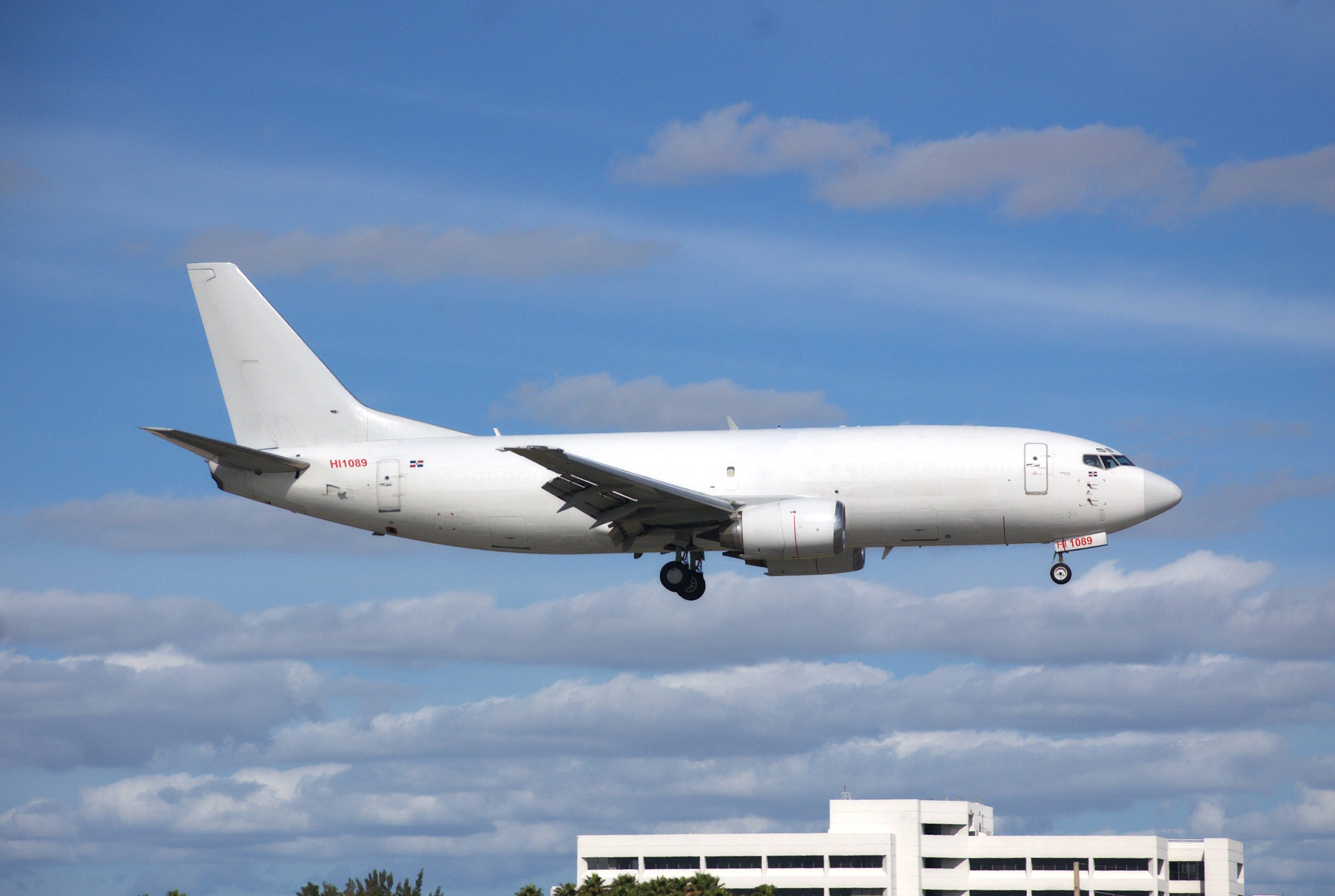
SKYhigh Cargo 737-300SF

As of July 2026, Sky High operates the following aircraft:

SKYhigh fleet
Aircraft	In service	Orders	Passengers			Notes
Aircraft	In service	Orders	C	Y	Total	Notes
Boeing 737-700	1	—	–	143	143	
Embraer 190	3	—	9	88	97	
Gulfstream V	1	—	17	–	17	
SKYhigh Cargo Express
Boeing 737-300F	1	—	Cargo			
Boeing 737-300BDSF	1	—	Cargo			
Boeing 737-400SF	1	—	Cargo			
Boeing 767-200BDSF	—	1	Cargo			
Total	8	1				

=== Former ===
Over the years, SKYhigh operated the following aircraft types:

- 2 British Aerospace Jetstream 41
- 2 Beechcraft 1900D
- 1 Beechcraft Baron 55
- 1 Beechcraft Model 99
- 2 Britten-Norman BN-2 Islander
- 3 Embraer 145
- 2 Embraer 175
- 1 Piper PA-32 (crashed)

== Accidents and incidents ==
- On April 20, 2015, a Piper PA-32, registered HI-957, took off from Punta Cana International Airport to Arroyo Barril Airport and crashed shortly after departure. All seven occupants on board were killed, and the fire destroyed the aircraft.
- On April 8, 2019, a British Aerospace Jetstream 41 (registration HI1038) crash landed at Douglas Charles Airport, Commonwealth of Dominica, after a commercial flight from Santo Domingo, Dominican Republic. There were no fatalities.

== See also ==
- List of airlines of the Dominican Republic
