= Sky Cana =

Dominican airline (2014–2024)

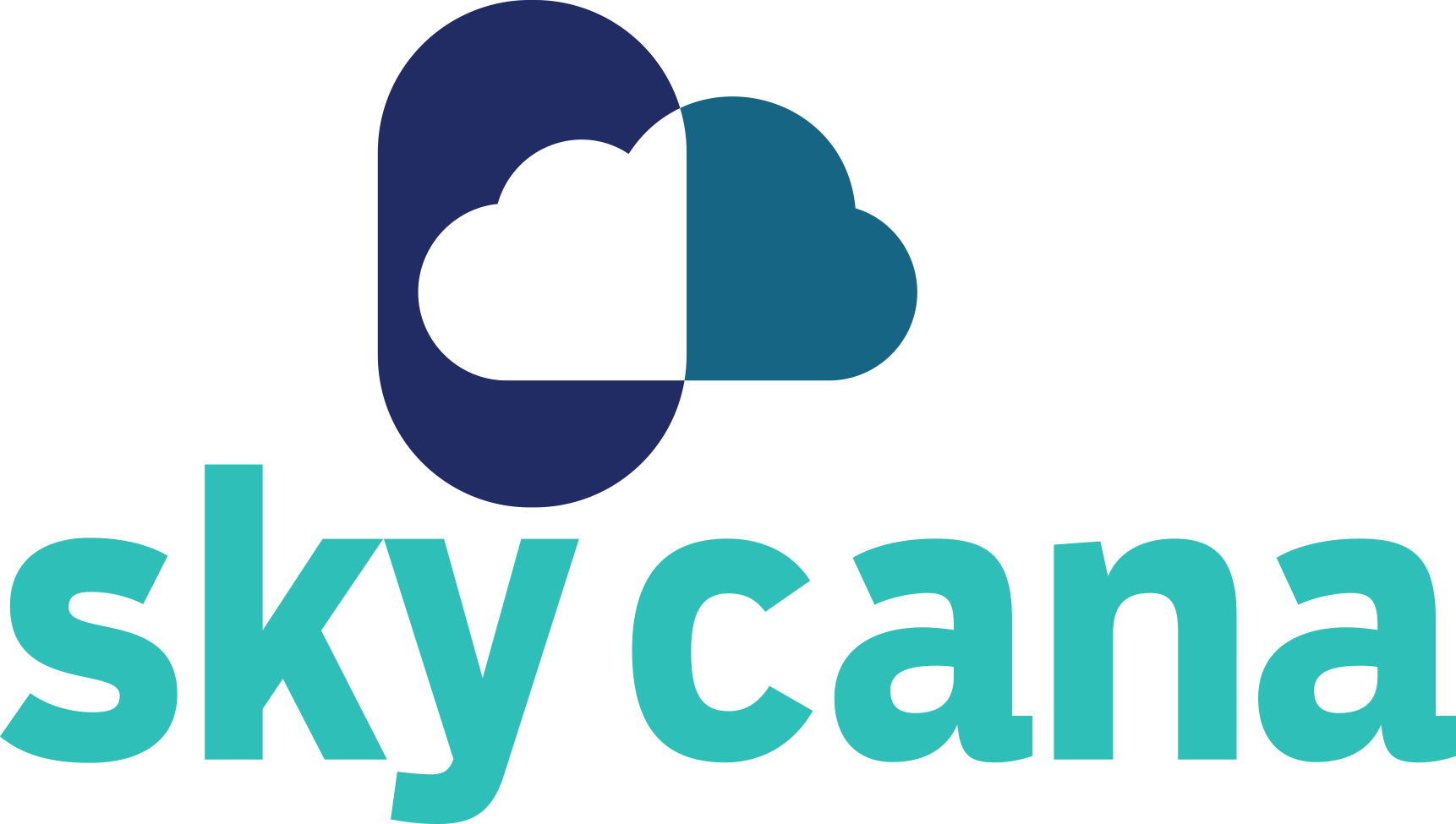

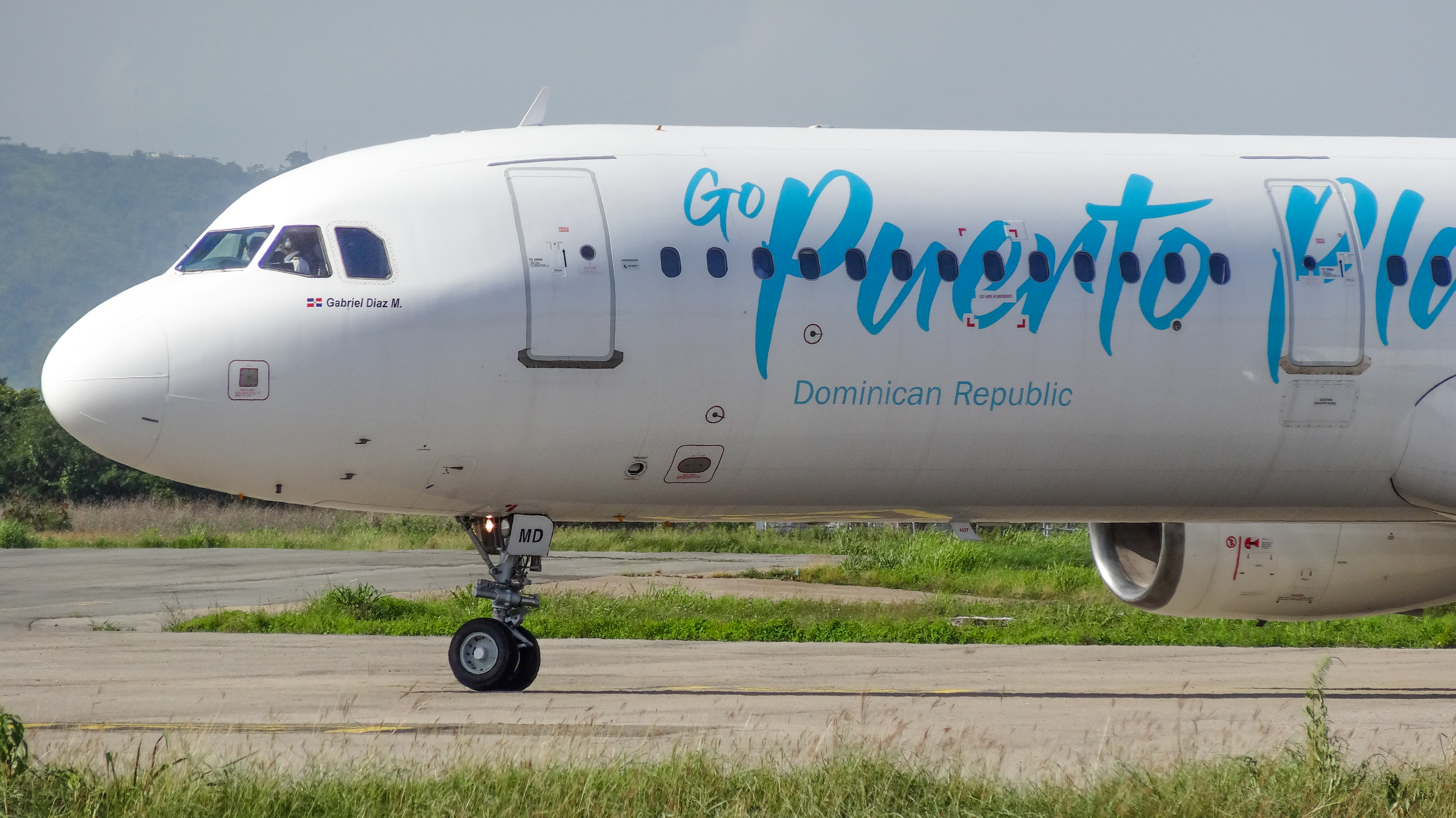
IATA	ICAO	Call sign
RD	SNA	CANA
- Founded: 2014
- Commenced operations: 30 January 2021
- Ceased operations: April 2024
- Hubs: Las Américas International Airport; Cibao International Airport
- Alliance: Air Century; Avion Express Malta; SKYhigh
- Parent company: LogicPaq
- Headquarters: Santo Domingo, Dominican Republic
- Key people: Frank Díaz (CEO)
- Website: skycana.com

Sky Holdings Corporation d/b/a Sky Cana was an airline with ACMI contracted operators headquartered in Santo Domingo. It started scheduled services to Caribbean and the United States from its two hubs: Las Américas International Airport and Cibao International Airport. The services offered are transfer, freight, overflight, helicopter, advertising, air ambulance, and tour services. For a short time, The airline operated scheduled flights from New York-JFK to Santiago de los Caballeros and Santo Domingo with two flights daily.

== History ==
In 2016, LogicPaq received its AOC from the Dominican Republic's civil aviation authority and planned to offer regular and charter flights between the Dominican Republic to Colombia, Mexico and United States for and on behalf of tour operators. Its first aircraft, an Airbus A321, was delivered on 28 November 2020.

In Mid-January 2021, Sky Cana became the 1st airline in the Americas to offer flights to nowhere, flights in which people board an aircraft for a nominal fee and fly around the city for about an hour before returning to the airport of origin, allowing passengers to sight-see in their city from the air.

At the end of January 2021, Sky Cana was designated by the Dominican Professional Baseball League (LIDOM) to operate the flight for the Champion team of the 2020-2021 winter series Águilas Cibaeñas to Mazatlán, Mexico. representing the Dominican Republic in the 2021 Caribbean Series. It also operated the flight for the 2022-2023 Champion team Tigres del Licey to Caracas, Venezuela. The team also represented the country in the 2023 Caribbean Series.

== Fleet ==
Sky Cana previously operated the following aircraft:

Sky Cana former fleet
Aircraft	Total	Introduced	Retired	Notes
Airbus A320-200	5	2022	2024	Leased from Avion Express Malta
Airbus A320-200	2	2022	2024	Leased from Heston Airlines
Airbus A321-200	3	2020	2024	Leased from Avion Express Malta
Airbus A330-300	1	2022	2023	Leased from SmartLynx Airlines Malta
ATR 72-200F	1	2021	2023	Operated by Air Century
Boeing 737-800BCF	1	2022	2023	Leased from Bluebird Nordic

== See also ==
- List of airlines of the Dominican Republic
