= HVL =

HVL may refer to:

- Half-value layer, in radiometry
- Hardware verification language, in computer science
- HeavyLift International, a defunct Emirati cargo airline
- Hope Valley Line, a railway line in England
- Hurstville railway station, in Sydney, Australia
- Hutt Valley Line, a rail line in New Zealand
- Western Norway University of Applied Sciences, the abbreviation derived from its Norwegian name
- Hailey Van Lith (born 2001), American basketball player
