= Samaná Airport =

Samaná Airport may refer to:

- Samaná El Catey International Airport in Samaná province, Dominican Republic
- Arroyo Barril International Airport in Samaná province, Dominican Republic
