= Air Inter Island =

Dominican airline

- Founded: August 15, 2003
- Hubs: Punta Cana International Airport
- Frequent-flyer program: Islander Club
- Fleet size: 1
- Headquarters: Santo Domingo, Dominican Republic
- Founder: Martin Maldonado Frómeta
- Employees: Eugenio Cabreja (Operations director)

Líneas Aéreas Inter Islas, SRL, doing business as Air Inter Island, was a Dominican Republic-based air carrier that operates domestics and international flights in the Dominican Republic and Haiti.

== History ==
The airline was founded August 15, 2003, by Martin Maldonado Frómeta.

Following the purchase of their first aircraft, a Britten Norman Islander on June 8, 2004, in Fort Lauderdale, Florida, the company operated as an "on-demand" charter airline serving the Dominican Republic and Haiti. The airline's initial main route was a daily service between Punta Cana and Samana.

On November 27, 2009, Air Inter Island received its AOC from the Instituto Dominicano de Aviacion Civil (IDAC).

== Destinations ==
As of January 2016, no scheduled flights are on offer, with charter-on-demand in the Dominican Republic and Haiti available only.

Air Inter Island previously flew to the following cities:

Dominican Republic

- Constanza - Constanza Airport
- Punta Cana - Punta Cana International Airport Hub
- Samaná - Arroyo Barril Airport
- Santo Domingo - La Isabela International Airport
- Santo Domingo - Las Américas International Airport

== Fleet ==
- 1 Piper PA-32 Cherokee Six

Air Inter Island previously operated the following aircraft:

- 1 Britten Norman Islander
- 1 Cessna 172
- 1 Cessna 182 Skylane
- 1 Cessna 206

== See also ==
- List of airlines of the Dominican Republic
