= VolAir =

Dominican-based airline

VolAir Lineas Aereas del Caribe
IATA	ICAO	Call sign
-	-	VOLAIR
- Founded: 2003
- Ceased operations: September 2011
- Hubs: La Isabela International Airport; Cibao International Airport
- Secondary hubs: Arroyo Barril International Airport
- Fleet size: 8
- Destinations: 11
- Parent company: Servair
- Headquarters: Santo Domingo
- Website: http://www.govolair.com/

VolAir was a Dominican-based airline that offered flights between many airports in the Dominican Republic and Haiti. Its hub was La Isabela International Airport in Santo Domingo.

== History ==
Volair was founded in 2003 and carries more than 3,000 passengers on its 8 white and yellow coloured aircraft. More than 6 airports in Dominican Republic are served. Aircraft range from the Cessna 172 with 3 seats to the Jetstream with seating up to 19.

== Fleet ==
Volair operated with a varied fleet of light commercial aircraft.

- 1 Piper Chieftain
- 2 Britten-Norman Islander Picture: VolAir at STI
- 3 BAe Jetstream 32
- 2 Let L-410
- 1 Cessna 206
- 2 Cessna 402

== Destinations ==
- Las Américas International Airport
- La Isabela International Airport
- Cibao International Airport
- Punta Cana International Airport
- Gregorio Luperón International Airport
- La Romana International Airport
- María Montez International Airport
- Arroyo Barril International Airport
- Cabo Rojo Airport
- Constanza Airport
- Osvaldo Virgil Airport
- Dajabón Airport
- Cap-Haitien International Airport
