= Caribbean Air Sign =

IATA	ICAO	Call sign
-	CAS	-
- Founded: 2006 as FlyTortuga
- Ceased operations: 21 October 2010
- Hubs: Punta Cana International Airport
- Fleet size: 3
- Destinations: 14
- Headquarters: Punta Cana, Dominican Republic
- Website: www.caribbeanairsign.com

Caribbean Air Sign, previously named FlyTortuga, was a Dominican-based carrier that operates flights into the Dominican Republic, with domestics flights, and from Dominican Republic to the Caribbean. The hub of this airline was Punta Cana International Airport.

== History ==
This airline was founded in 2006 with the name of FlyTortuga Inc., but failed. In 2008 the airline changed their name to Caribbean Air Sign (CAS); it ran a charter operation with three owned aircraft.

== Destinations ==
Domestics

- Cabo Rojo Airport
- La Romana International Airport
- Punta Cana International Airport Hub
- Cibao International Airport
- María Montez International Airport
- Las Américas International Airport
- Arroyo Barril International Airport
- Gregorio Luperón International Airport

International

- Cuba
  Turks and Caicos Islands
  Jamaica
  Haiti
  Puerto Rico
  St. Maarten

== Fleet ==
- 1 Piper PA-31 Navajo
- 2 Cessna 172
