= Herrera International Airport =

Airport of Santo Domingo, Dominican Republic (1973–2006)

Coordinates: 18°28′15″N 69°58′09″W

Herrera International Airport Aeropuerto Internacional de Herrera
- IATA: HEX; ICAO: MDHE

Summary
- Airport type: Defunct
- Location: Santo Domingo
- Opened: 1973
- Closed: February 23, 2006
- Elevation AMSL: 203 ft / 62 m
- Interactive map of Herrera International Airport

Runways
Direction	Length		Surface
Direction	ft	m	Surface
01/19	4,000	1,219	Asphalt

Herrera International Airport (IATA: HEX, ICAO: MDHE) was an airport located in Santo Domingo, Dominican Republic. Herrera used to be the hub of most Dominican airlines before being closed in 2006 and replaced by La Isabela International Airport, also in Santo Domingo. The airport had domestic flights and connections to Puerto Rico, Cuba, and other Caribbean islands.

== History ==
The airport began commercial operations in 1973. The airport was formally closed on February 23, 2006, when it was handed over to the military, who blocked the runway with vehicles. There are plans to convert the site of the former airport into a park. Flights were moved either to La Isabela or to Las Américas International Airport.
