= Haïti Trans Air =

Haiti airline (1986–1995)

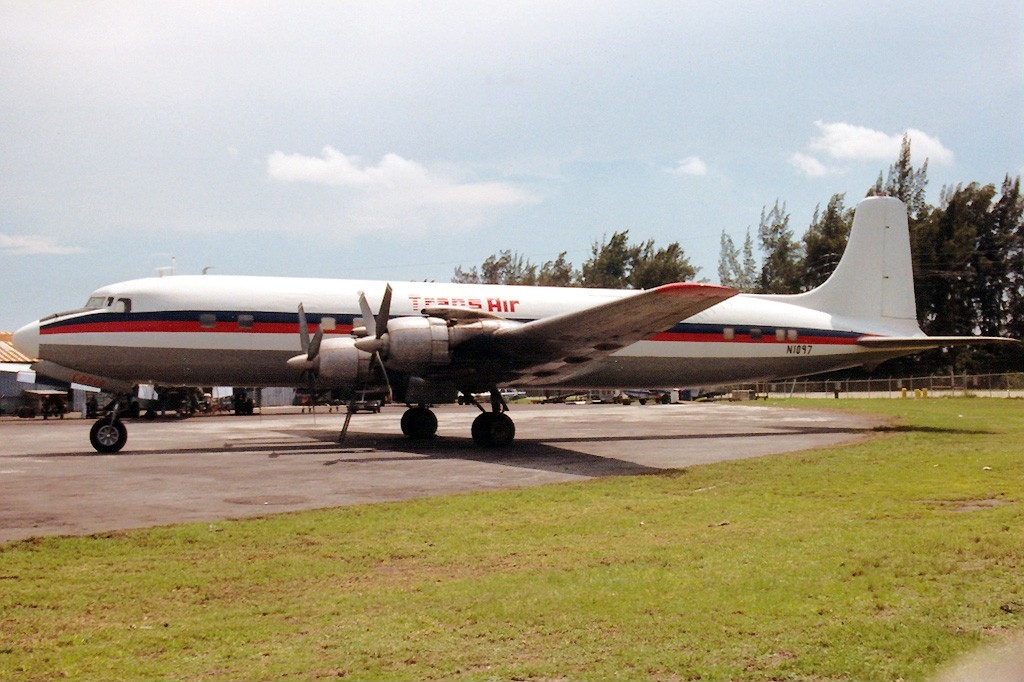
IATA	ICAO	Call sign
TV	HTC	Haïti Trans Air
- Founded: 1986
- Ceased operations: 1995
- Fleet size: 4
- Headquarters: Port-au-Prince, Haïti

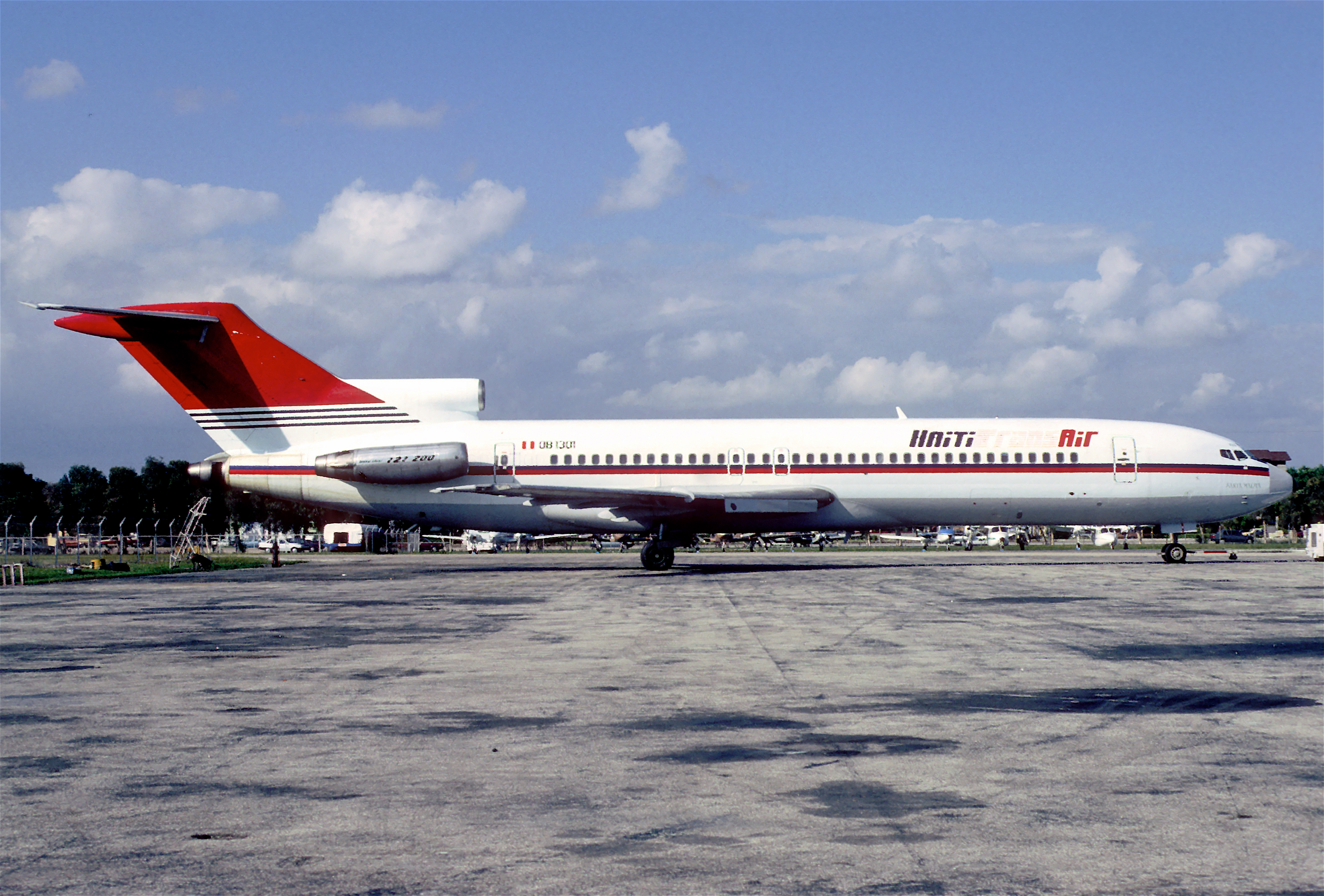
A Peruvian registered Boing 727-247 of Haiti Trans Air

Haïti Trans Air was an airline based in Port-au-Prince, Haiti, which was operational from 1986 to 1995.

== History ==
Haïti Trans Air began operations in 1987 with a single Boeing 727-247 with flights mainly to Miami. A second Boeing 727 was received in 1988 configured in a combi layout. The airline expanded operations to include San Juan and Kingston, Jamaica. In December 1990 a Boeing 737-222 was added for a brief period of time, then in 1992 a Douglas DC-8-61 was added to the fleet and operations expanded with multiple daily flights to Miami and San Juan. Due to the political instability in the island, the tourist traffic almost disappeared and Haïti Trans Air found itself not being able to meet its obligations. Flight schedules were scaled back and one of the Boeing 727s was taken out of service because the airline could not afford to keep it flying. In March 1995 the situation could not be sustained anymore and Haïti Trans Air went out of business.

== Fleet ==
- 2 Boeing 727-247
- 1 Boeing 737-222
- 1 Douglas DC-8-61
