= Antonio Maceo Airport =

Antonio Maceo Airport Aeropuerto Internacional Antonio Maceo y Grajales
- IATA: SCU; ICAO: MUCU

Summary
- Airport type: Public
- Operator: ECASA
- Location: Santiago de Cuba
- Elevation AMSL: 76 m (249 ft)
- Coordinates: 19°58′12″N 075°50′08″W

Map
- Location in Cuba

Runways
Direction	Length		Surface
Direction	m	ft	Surface
10/28	4,002	13,130	Asphalt
01/19	1,400	4,593	Asphalt
- Aerodrome chart

Antonio Maceo Airport (IATA: SCU, ICAO: MUCU) is an international airport located in Santiago, Cuba.

== Overview ==
The airport has a drawing of Che Guevara on one of its outside walls. Pope John Paul II flew to this airport during his last visit to Cuba, flying a round trip between here and José Martí International Airport in Havana. Likewise, Pope Benedict XVI, during the second papal visit to Cuba, flew here for Mass and other activities, from his visit to León, Guanajuato in Mexico, before moving on to Havana.

The airport was home to the Cuban Revolutionary Armed Forces, which had stationed Antonov An-2, Antonov An-26, Mil Mi-8 and Mil Mi-24 aircraft here. The helipads are now part of the executive jet terminal on the north end of the airport.

The airport is mostly used by turbo-prop aircraft. Nevertheless, jet aircraft also serve this airport. Most commercial flights were at one point domestic, but there are about twenty international flights each week; while these international flights were at one point done mostly by domestic airlines, the international routes have nevertheless awakened the interest of some foreign airlines that have opened flights into this airport and might open more flights in the future.

Hurricane Melissa damaged the airport in October 2025 and forced it to close.

== Airlines and destinations ==
Airlines	Destinations
Aerogaviota	Havana
Air Century	Santo Domingo–La Isabela
American Airlines	Miami
Cubana de Aviación	Havana
Fly All Ways	Paramaribo
InterCaribbean Airways	Kingston–Norman Manley
Sunrise Airways	Port-au-Prince

== Accidents and incidents ==
- On 13 June 1929, a Fokker F.10A (NC9700) of Pan Am crashed on takeoff for Havana at 08:00, killing 2 of the 5 occupants. This was Cuba's first fatal airliner crash.
- On 10 April 1959, a Douglas DC-3 (registration unknown) of Compagnie Haitienne de Transports Aériens (COHATA) was hijacked on a passenger flight from Les Cayes to Port-au-Prince by 6 rebels who killed the captain and forced the co-pilot to fly to Cuba, the plane was then was landed in Santiago.
- On 2 October 1959, a Viscount of Cubana de Aviación was hijacked on a flight from Havana to Antonio Maceo Airport, Santiago de Cuba by three men demanding to be taken to the United States. The aircraft landed at the Miami International Airport. There were no injuries or fatalities among the 40 people on board and no damage to the aircraft.
- On 27 March 1962, an Ilyushin Il-14 (CU-T819) on Cubana de Aviacion Flight 853 to Havana crashed into the sea during initial climb at 20:00, 1.6 km (1 mile) from here, killing all 22 occupants.
- On 23 March 1990, an Antonov An-26 (CU-T1436) on Cubana de Aviacion Flight 7406 overran the runway after aborting takeoff, killing 4 of the 46 occupants.
- On 24 October 1990, a Yakovlev Yak-40S2 (CU-T1202) on Cubana de Aviacion Flight 2886 from Camaguey crashed into mountainous terrain at 01:58, 4 km (2.5 miles) east of the runway at 94 m (308 feet) on approach, killing 11 of the 31 occupants. The crew attempted the landing visually in instrument-only weather conditions.
- On 11 July 1997, an Antonov An-24RV (CU-T1262) on Cubana de Aviacion Flight 787 to Havana crashed at 21:56 due to loss of control during the initial climb 5 km (3.1 miles) off the airport over the sea, killing all 44 occupants.
- On 4 November 2010, Aero Caribbean Flight 883, an ATR 72-212, crashed in the centre of the country with 68 people on board. The aircraft was flying from Santiago de Cuba to Havana when it went down. 28 foreigners were reported to be among the passengers. There were no survivors.
