= Avolar =

Mexican low-cost airline

Avolar Aerolíneas

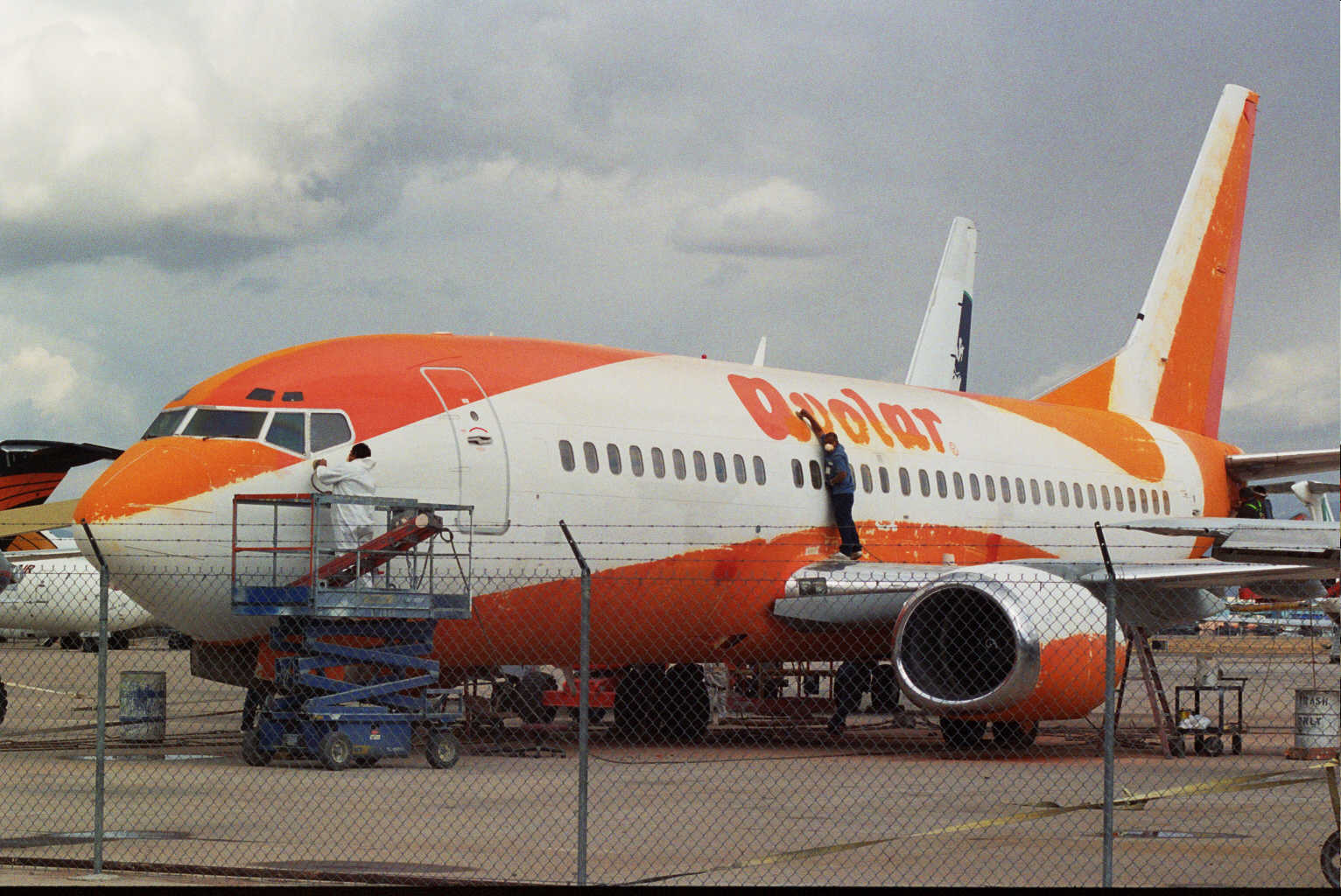
IATA	ICAO	Call sign
V5	VLI	AVOLAR
- Founded: 2005; 21 years ago
- Commenced operations: September 7, 2005; 20 years ago
- Ceased operations: 2008; 18 years ago
- Hubs: Gen. Abelardo L. Rodríguez Int'l Airport
- Focus cities: Don Miguel Hidalgo Int'l Airport
- Headquarters: Tijuana, BC, Mexico
- Key people: Jorge Nehme Name(CEO)

Avolar Aerolíneas, S.A. de C.V. (sensational spelling of "a volar", roughly meaning "Let's fly") was a low-cost airline based in Tijuana, Baja California, Mexico, with corporate offices in Tijuana. The airline operated a domestic network of 17 cities as of October 2008. Avolar's main base was located at the sole large-hangar facility at the Tijuana International Airport in Tijuana. The airline's slogan was "La aerolinea de la gente", meaning "The airline of the people".

== History ==
Avolar began operations on 7 September 2005 with a single Boeing 737-500 aircraft.

On August 4, 2008, the Mexican Ministry of Communications and Transports suspended all Avolar operations due to tax debts, leaving thousands stranded at Tijuana Airport. Four days later, the airline resumed all flights.

On the night of October 3, 2008, Mexico's aviation authorities again suspended Avolar operations; the airline canceled flights from Tijuana International Airport that were bound for Guadalajara and Cuernavaca at that time without any previous warning, leaving 160 passengers stranded at the airport. However, 13 hours later, on October 4, the airline resumed all services normally.

On October 28, 2008, the Secretaria de Comunicaciones y Transportes (SCT), Mexico's Communications and Transports Secretariat, finally barred Avolar from all operations, due to the illegal operations of the airline after its airspace operative concession had expired the previous day, leaving employees with no compensation.

== Destinations ==
Avolar operated to the following destinations within Mexico:

- Acapulco
- Aguascalientes
- Colima
- Cuernavaca
- Culiacán
- Durango
- Guadalajara
- Hermosillo
- La Paz
- León
- Los Mochis
- Morelia
- Puebla
- Querétaro City
- Tapachula
- Tepic
- Tijuana
- Toluca
- Uruapan
- Zacatecas
- Zihuatanejo

== Fleet ==
As of November 2008, the Avolar fleet included the following aircraft:

- 5 Boeing 737-300
- 3 Boeing 737-500

=== Retired fleet ===
- 2 Boeing 737-200
