= Air Century =

Dominican airline

Air Century S.A.

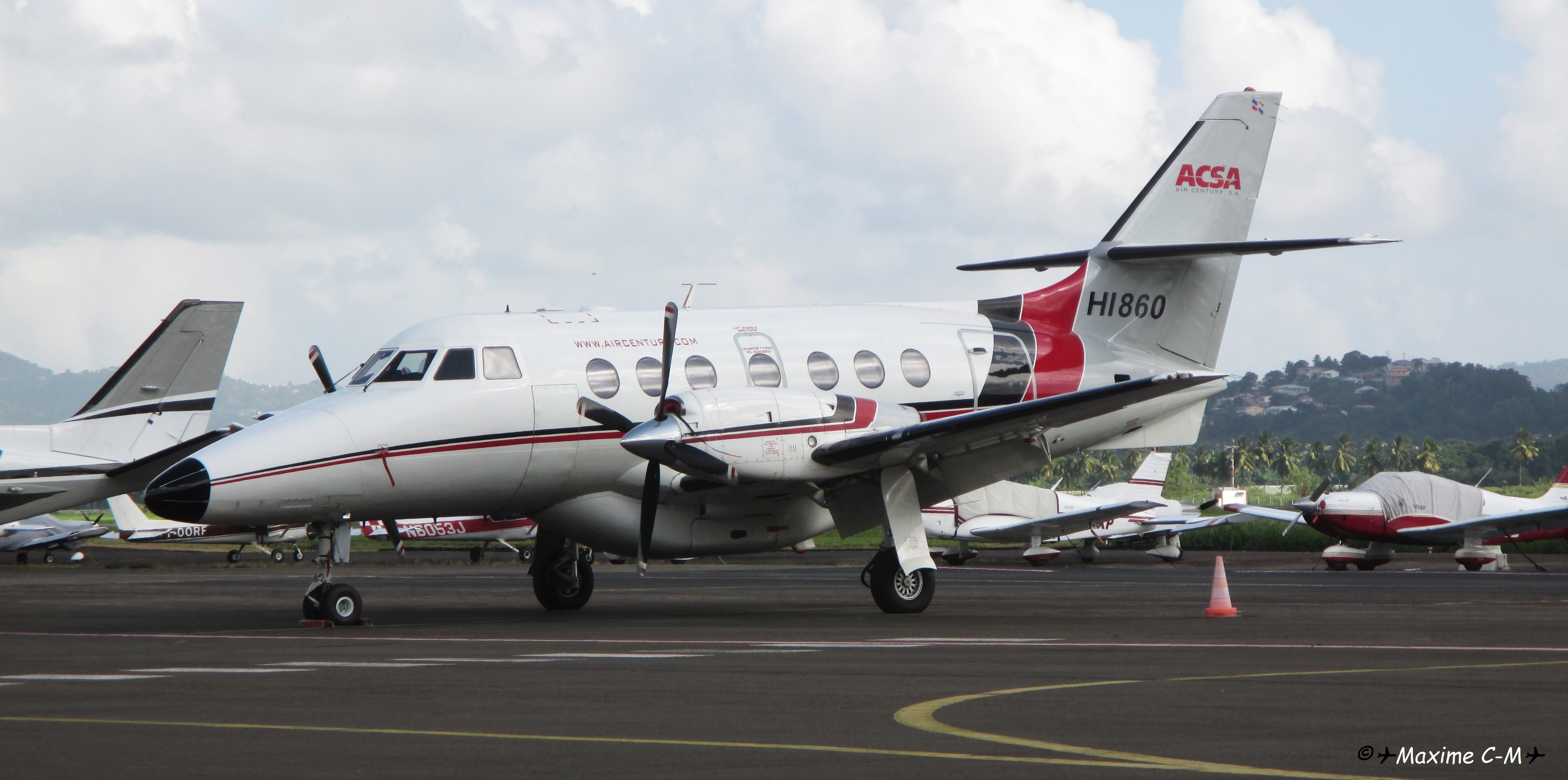
- Air Century British Aerospace Jetstream 32
IATA	ICAO	Call sign
Y2	CEY	CENTURYFLIGHT
- Founded: c. 1992
- Commenced operations: March 1992
- AOC #: ACEA001A
- Hubs: Santo Domingo–La Isabela
- Secondary hubs: Punta Cana
- Fleet size: 4
- Destinations: 8
- Headquarters: La Isabela International Airport, Hangar 4, Santo Domingo Norte, Dominican Republic
- Key people: Omar Chahin (Founder & CEO)
- Employees: +120
- Website: www.aircentury.com

ACSA - Air Century, S.A. is a Dominican airline that operates charter and regularly scheduled services from La Isabela International Airport. The company was founded by Captain and Pilot Omar Chahin. Air Century commenced operations in March 1992 and is currently the longest-running still active Dominican airline.

This airline offers charter flights, regularly scheduled services, and air cargo transport through the Dominican Republic, the Caribbean, South America, and North America.

== Scheduled destinations ==
Air Century operates scheduled flights to the following destinations (as of June 2026):

Country	City	Airport	Notes	Refs
Aruba	Oranjestad	Queen Beatrix International Airport		
Bonaire	Kralendijk	Flamingo International Airport		
Cuba	Havana	José Martí International Airport		
Cuba	Santiago de Cuba	Antonio Maceo Airport		
Curaçao	Willemstad	Curaçao International Airport		
Dominican Republic	Punta Cana	Punta Cana International Airport	Hub	
Dominican Republic	Santo Domingo	La Isabela International Airport	Hub	
Sint Maarten	Philipsburg	Princess Juliana International Airport		

== Fleet ==
=== Current ===
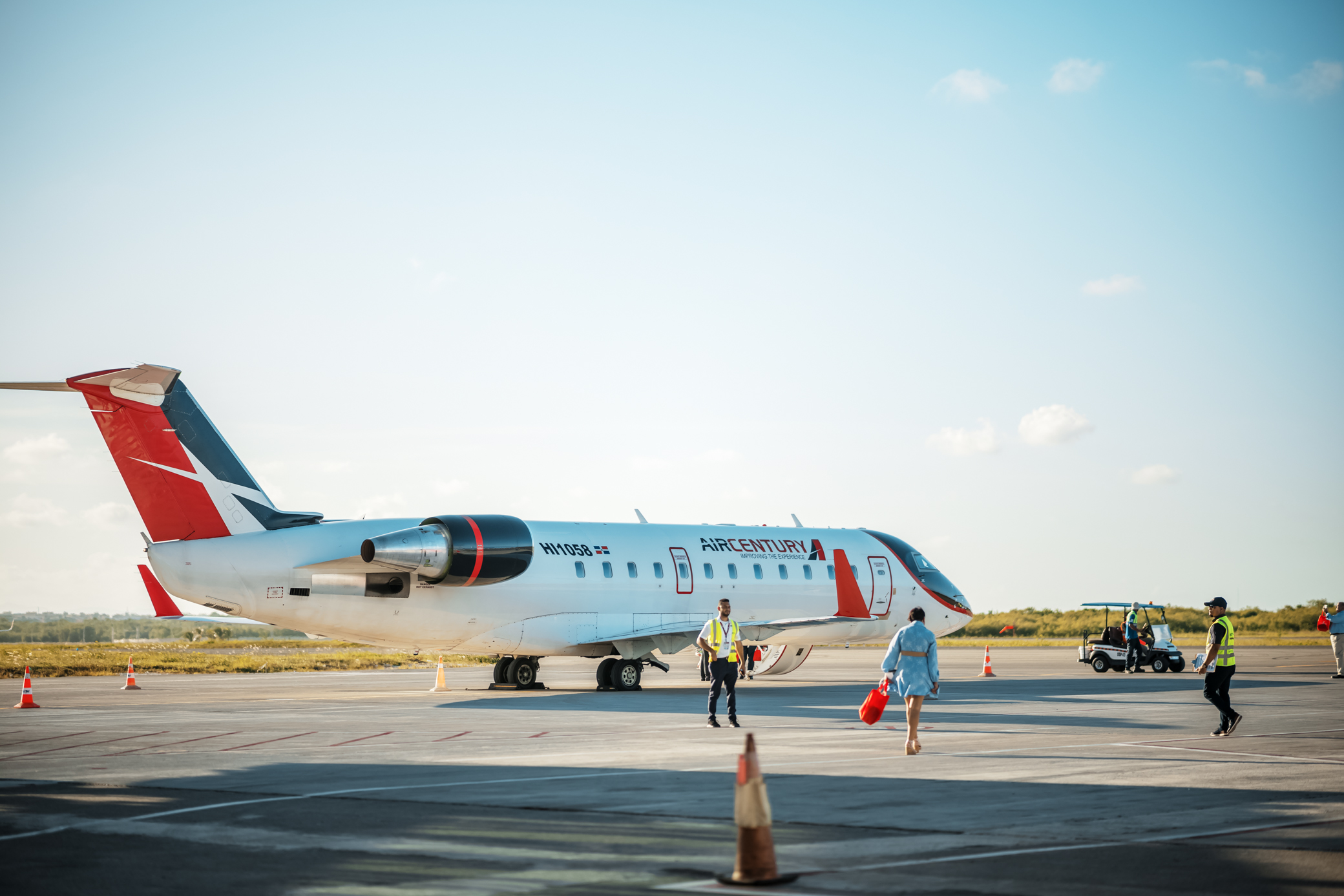
An Air Century Bombardier CRJ200 in Punta Cana International Airport in 2023

Air Century's fleet consists of the following aircraft (as of February 2026):

Aircraft	In service	Orders	Passengers	Notes
Bombardier CRJ200ER	3	—	50	
Gulfstream IV-SP	1	—	13	
Total	4	—		

=== Former ===
Air Century formerly operated the following aircraft:

Aircraft	Total	Introduced	Retired	Notes
ATR 72-200F	1	2017	2023	Operated for LogicPaq

== Accidents and incidents ==
- On 13 October 2014, a British Aerospace Jetstream 32 (HI816) was destroyed by fire at Punta Cana after an engine failure on short final, after a charter flight from Luis Muñoz Marín International Airport in San Juan, Puerto Rico. All 13 passengers and two flight crew on board were evacuated safely.

== See also ==
- List of airlines of the Dominican Republic
