= Volo (airline) =

Charter airline in the Dominican Republic

Volo Airways Dominicana
IATA	ICAO	Call sign
DC	OLO	VOLODO
- Founded: 1980 (as AeroDomca); 2024 (as Volo)
- Hubs: Las Americas International Airport
- Fleet size: 1+2
- Destinations: Charter-ACMI
- Headquarters: Santo Domingo

Volo Airways Dominicana (formerly branded as Aeronaves Dominicanas and AeroDomca) is a charter airline with facilities in Las Americas International Airport and main offices in Santo Domingo, Dominican Republic. It is currently the Longest-Lived Airline in the Entire Dominican Republic, (by Age) Created in 1980, it was not acquired by new owners until 2023/2024. Applying a change in business model.

== Destinations ==
airline serves major cities of the Dominican Republic and the Caribbean. The services offered are transfer, freight, overflight, advertising, air ambulance, Aircraft, Crew, Maintenance and Insurance (ACMI) and tour services.

2025-2026 the Airline operates flights for Sunrise Airways under an ACMI contract.

== Fleet ==
As of August 2025, Volo operates the following aircraft:

Volo fleet
Aircraft	In service	Orders	Passengers	Notes
Embraer ERJ 140	1	—	44	
Embraer ERJ 145		2	50	With option to new premium interiors
Total	1	—		

== See also ==
- List of airlines of the Dominican Republic
