= Helicap =

Singaporean fintech and investment company

Helicap Pte.Ltd.
- Type: Private
- Industry: FinTech; Investments;Private Credit
- Founded: 2018; 8 years ago
- Headquarters: Singapore
- Website: www.helicap.com

Helicap is a Singapore-based financial technology and investment firm founded in 2018 that specializes in the private credit market across Southeast Asia and the broader Asia-Pacific region. The company operates as a tech-enabled bridge, connecting institutional and professional investors with a target market of over 35,000 non-bank financial institutions (NBFIs) and high-growth startups.

By the end of 2025, Helicap surpassed US$700 million in cumulative deployed volume, facilitating capital access for underbanked small and medium enterprises (SMEs) and individuals.

== History and Strategic Growth ==
=== Founding (2018) ===
The company was incorporated on January 18, 2018, by David Z Wang (CEO), Quentin Vanoekel (CIO), and Jeremy Tan (COO). The founders established Helicap to address a massive financing gap—estimated at over US$500 billion—for micro, small, and medium enterprises (MSMEs) that traditional banking sectors are often unable to serve.

=== Regional Expansion and Milestones ===
- Early Momentum (2018–2021): Following a US$1.5 million seed round led by former Singapore Minister Teo Ser Luck, the firm secured US$5 million in Pre-Series A funding from East Ventures and Soilbuild Group. It later raised US$10 million in a Series A round led by Saison Capital.
- Acquisitions and Strategic Investment: In 2019, Helicap acquired the securities firm Arcor Capital (rebranded as Helicap Securities). In early 2025, the firm completed its Series B investment round led by Malaysia’s Kenanga Investment Bank Berhad.
- Central Asia Expansion (2025): Helicap marked a significant geographical milestone in late 2025 by entering Mongolia, adding a ninth country to its operational footprint. This included a financing facility of up to US$25 million for Pocket NBFI to scale digital lending operations.

== Regional Operations ==
Beyond its Singapore headquarters, Helicap maintains strategic operational presence. Employees, often referred to as "Helicappers," are situated in key regional markets to enhance sourcing and due diligence capabilities. These operational hubs include Malaysia, Indonesia, and India, reflecting the firm's commitment to deeply integrating into the diverse private credit ecosystems across Southeast Asia and the broader Asia-Pacific region.

== Business Model and Technology ==
=== Proprietary Analytics Engine ===
Helicap’s operations are powered by a proprietary credit analytics engine designed to process millions of data points from loan originators.

- Efficiency: The technology reportedly reduces the time required for due diligence significantly.
- Risk Management: The platform extracts performance metrics and granular data to inform underwriting and risk frameworks, particularly for companies that lack traditional credit histories.

=== Regulated Subsidiaries ===
The group operates through subsidiaries licensed by the Monetary Authority of Singapore (MAS):

- Helicap Investments Pte. Ltd.: Holds a full Capital Markets Services (CMS) licence in fund management.
- Helicap Securities Pte. Ltd.: Holds a Capital Markets Services (CMS) license for dealing in securities and acts as a lead arranger for debt facilities.

== Social Impact and Diversity ==
Helicap integrates Environmental, Social, and Governance (ESG) criteria across its investment lifecycle.

- Financial Inclusion: Through its originator partners, the firm is indirectly connected to over 200 million MSMEs and individuals across Asia. In 2023, it collaborated with Temasek Trust and the UNCDF to publish Southeast Asia's first Financial Inclusion Report.
- Workforce Diversity: As of 2025, the company maintains a team where 50% are women.

== Historical Performance and Recognition ==
Metric (as of end of 2025)	Achievement
Total Deployed Volume	>US$700 Million
Total Deals Closed	500+
Geographic Footprint	9 Countries
Funding Partners	Kenanga, East Ventures, Saison Capital, Tikehau Capital, Soilbuild Group, PhillipCapital

=== Awards ===
The firm has received numerous accolades for its technology and private credit expertise:

- Technology Excellence Award (Singapore Business Review, 2025).
- Top Fintech Companies 2026 (Tech in Asia).
- Best Private Credit Investment Specialists 2026, South East Asia (Singapore Business Awards).
