= Royal Lavanderia =

Dry cleaning company

Royal Lavanderia is a dry cleaning company established in 1995 in Santo Domingo, Dominican Republic and responsible for 63.4% of the market share of the dry cleaning market in the Dominican Republic. The company is known for its home pickup service, as well as its high quality standards. It has many locations throughout the Dominican Republic, including a franchise in San Francisco de Macorís which opened in 2021, as well as a branch in Barahona which opened in 2024. The first branch to open was on Doctor Defilló Street in Bella Vista, which re-opened 15 years later equipped with modern laundry and dry cleaning equipment. As of 2013, the president of the company was Arístides López. The company acquired Dry Clean USA, which was previously the largest dry cleaning chain in the country.
