= TransMeridian Airlines =

Charter airline of the United States (1995–2005)

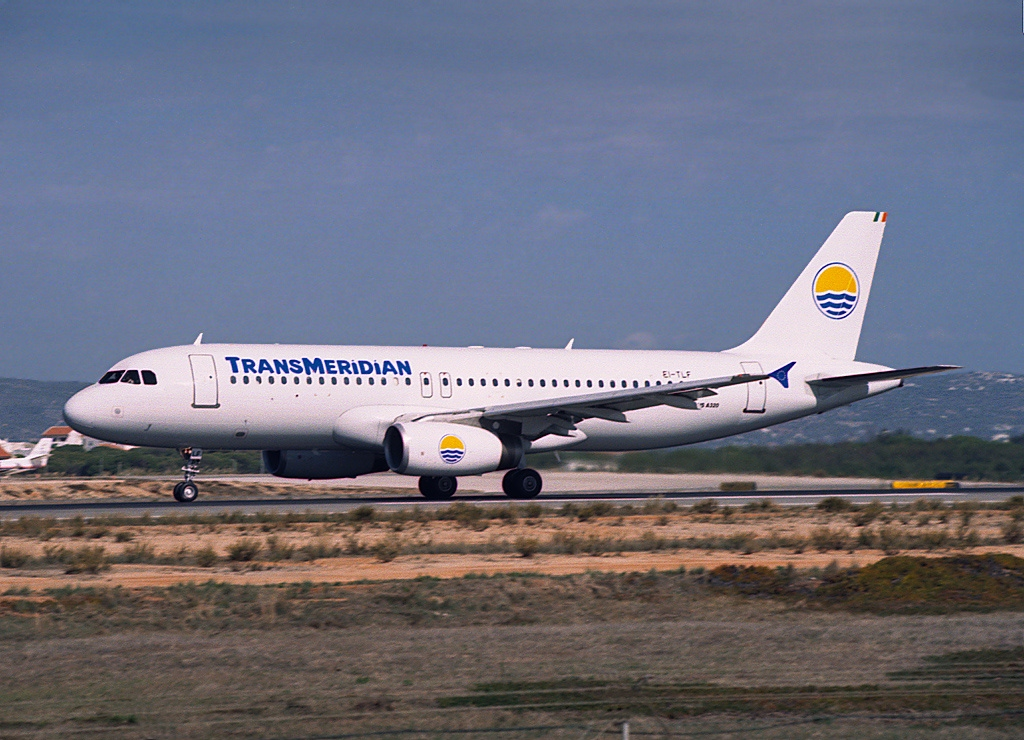
IATA	ICAO	Call sign
T9	TRZ	TRANS MERIDIAN
- Founded: 1995
- Ceased operations: September 29, 2005
- Hubs: Orlando Sanford International Airport
- Fleet size: 11 (At time of closure)
- Headquarters: Atlanta, Georgia

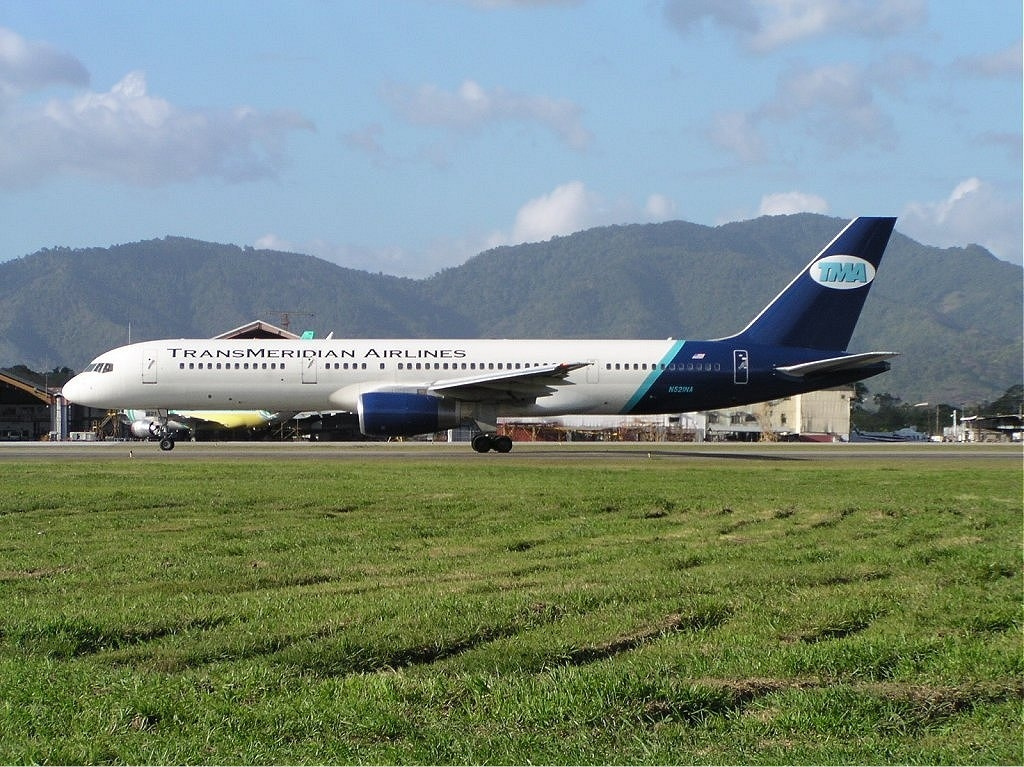
TransMeridian Airlines Boeing 757-200, Port of Spain, 2003

TransMeridian Airlines was a charter airline based in Atlanta, Georgia, United States, operating under U.S. Department of Transportation Federal Aviation Regulations Part 121. It ceased all operations on September 29, 2005, after negotiations with creditors to restructure its debt failed.

== History ==
The scheduled charter airline was founded in 1995. TransMeridian originally flew on behalf of the nation’s largest tour operators from the upper Midwest and Northeast to points in the Caribbean and Mexico, but later expanded to operate its own branded scheduled charter service with an additional focus on Florida destinations. At its peak, it had 7 Boeing 727s, 11 Airbus A320, 7 Boeing 757 and 7 MD-80 aircraft in service.

Over its ten-year history, TransMeridian safely carried well over one million passengers to over 150 destinations primarily within the United States, Mexico, South America and the Caribbean.

At the time of its closing, TransMeridian operated a domestic hub operation from Orlando Sanford International Airport (SFB) with service to Syracuse, NY, Rockford, IL, Allentown, PA, Harrisburg, PA, Toledo, OH, Belleville, IL, Louisville, KY, Cincinnati, OH and Las Vegas, NV. International TMA destinations included Liberia, Costa Rica; Aruba; Punta Cana and Puerto Plata, Dominican Republic; and San Juan and Aguadilla, Puerto Rico.

In 2004, Senator John Kerry used a chartered Boeing 757 from TransMeridian for his 2004 presidential campaign.

The airline declared Chapter 7 bankruptcy on 29 September 2005 and ceased all operations.

== Fleet ==
The TransMeridian Airlines fleet consisted of the following aircraft:

- 13 Airbus A320-200
- 7 Boeing 727-200
- 7 Boeing 757-200
- 5 McDonnell Douglas MD-82
- 2 McDonnell Douglas MD-83

== Destinations ==
The vacation charter destinations operated by Transmeridian Airlines during its existence are detailed below:

Transmeridian Airlines destinations
Countries	Destinations	Airports	Notes
United States	Sanford	Orlando-Sanford International Airport	HUB
United States	Las Vegas	Harry Reid International Airport	
United States	Rockford	Chicago Rockford International Airport	
United States	Mascoutah	MidAmerica St. Louis Airport	
United States	Syracuse	Syracuse Hancock International Airport	
United States	Allentown	Lehigh Valley International Airport	
United States	Harrisburg	Harrisburg International Airport	
United States	Toledo	Toledo Express Airport	
United States	Cincinnati	Cincinnati/Northern Kentucky International Airport	
United States	Louisville	Louisville International Airport	
United States	Cleveland	Cleveland Hopkins International Airport	
United States	Chicago	Chicago O'Hare International Airport	
United States	Houston	George Bush Intercontinental Airport	
United States	Detroit	Detroit Metropolitan Wayne County Airport	
United States	San Antonio	San Antonio International Airport	
Mexico	Cancun	Cancun International Airport	
Mexico	Puerto Vallarta	Puerto Vallarta International Airport	
Dominican Republic	Punta Cana	Punta Cana International Airport	
Dominican Republic	Puerto Plata	Puerto Plata International Airport	
Puerto Rico	San Juan	San Juan International Airport	
Puerto Rico	Aguadilla	Rafael Hernandez International Airport	
Costa Rica	Liberia	Liberia International Airport	
Aruba	Oranjestad	Queen Beatrix International Airport	

== See also ==
- List of defunct airlines of the United States
