= Aerolíneas Mas =

Airline of the Dominican Republic

Aerolíneas Mas, C x A
IATA	ICAO	Call sign
N3	MAF	AEROMAS
- Founded: c. 2005
- Commenced operations: 2005
- Ceased operations: 2015 (merged with Sunrise Airways)
- Hubs: La Isabela International Airport; Cibao International Airport
- Fleet size: 3
- Destinations: 13
- Headquarters: Santo Domingo, Dominican Republic
- Website: www.aerolineasmas.com

Aerolíneas Mas was an airline with its corporate headquarters in the Ciudad Universitaria (University City) in Santo Domingo, Dominican Republic. It offered flights to several domestic destinations. Its flight operations were based at La Isabela International Airport in Santo Domingo.

== History ==
Aerolíneas Mas was founded in 2005 as a charter airline. Then it became a regular airline with all flights to the Caribbean.

== Fleet ==
Three aircraft conformed the airline's fleet.

Aerolíneas MAS Fleet
Aircraft	Total	Based at	Remarks
Jetstream 32	2	JBQ	HI859, HI874
Cessna 206	1	JBQ	HI411

== Destinations ==
Regular:

Dominican Republic

- Punta Cana - Punta Cana International Airport
- Santiago - Cibao International Airport
- Santo Domingo - La Isabela International Airport

Haiti

- Haiti - Toussaint Louverture International Airport

Aruba

- Aruba - Queen Beatrix International Airport

Charter:

Dominican Republic

- Barahona - María Montez International Airport
- La Romana - La Romana International Airport
- Monte Cristi - Osvaldo Virgil Airport
- Pedernales - Cabo Rojo Airport
- Samaná - Arroyo Barril International Airport

Curacao

- Willemstad - Hato International Airport

Sint Maarten

- Philipsburg - Princess Julianna International Airport

Trinidad and Tobago

- Port of Spain - Piarco International Airport
