= Aeromar Líneas Aéreas Dominicanas =

Airline of the Dominican Republic

IATA	ICAO	Call sign
BQ	ROM	BRAVO QUEBEC
- Founded: 1962; 64 years ago (as a cargo airline); 1998; 28 years ago (passenger services)
- Ceased operations: 2003; 23 years ago
- Hubs: Las Américas International Airport
- Secondary hubs: Cibao International Airport; John F. Kennedy International Airport
- Focus cities: Miami International Airport
- Frequent-flyer program: Viajero de Plata (SilverFlyer)
- Fleet size: 6
- Destinations: 8
- Headquarters: Santo Domingo, Dominican Republic
- Key people: Raymundo Polanco Alegria (CEO); Ryan Polanco (CFO)
- Website: www.aeromarairlines.com (closed)

Aeromar Líneas Aéreas Dominicanas (also known as Aeromar Airlines) was an airline based in the Dominican Republic.

== History ==
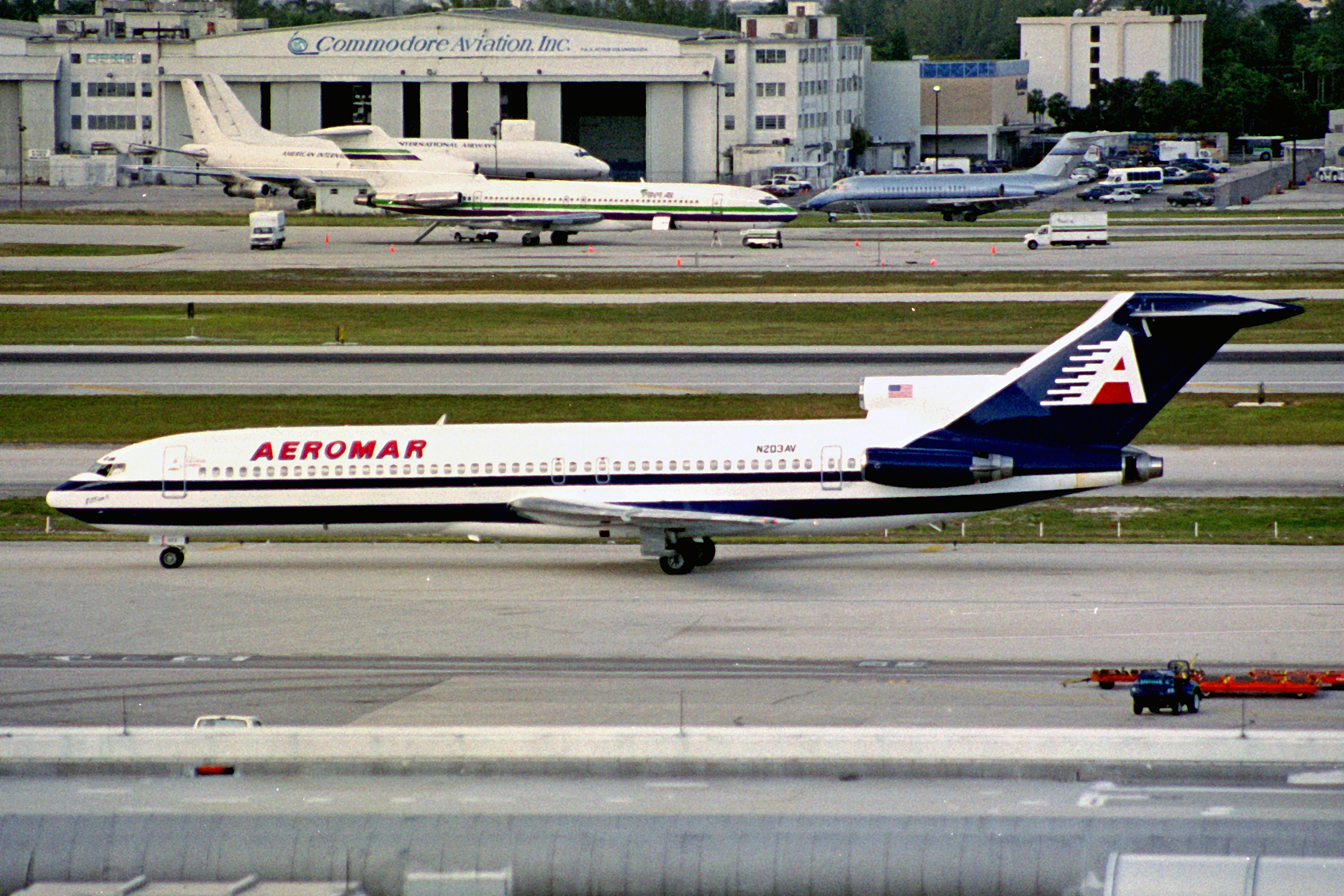
Aeromar Boeing 727-200 at Miami International Airport in 1999

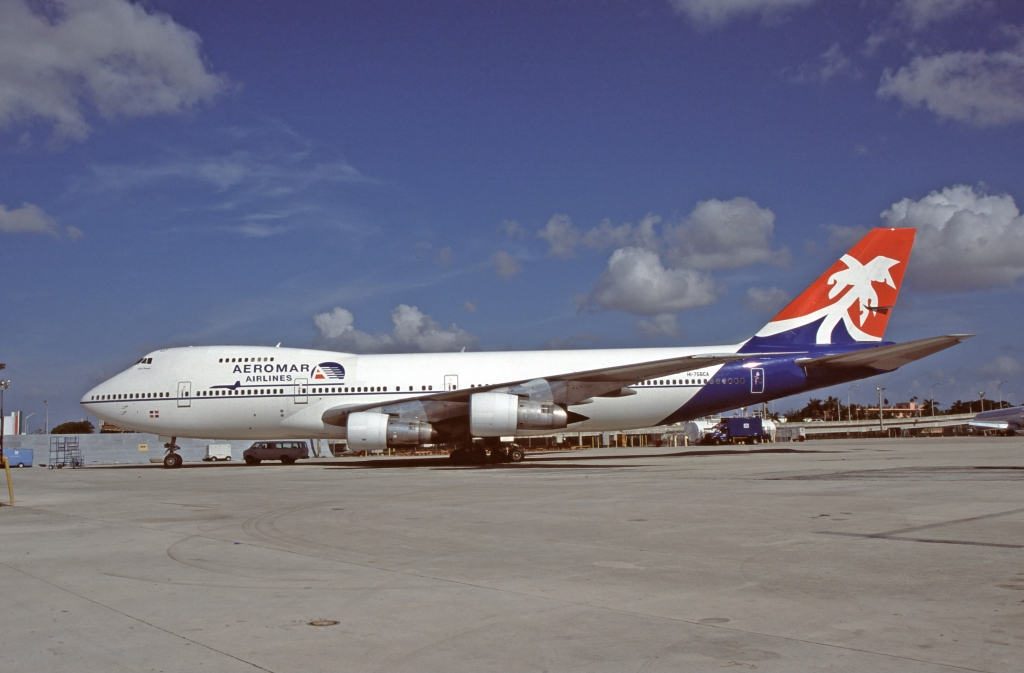
Aeromar's sole Boeing 747-200B at Miami International Airport in 2000

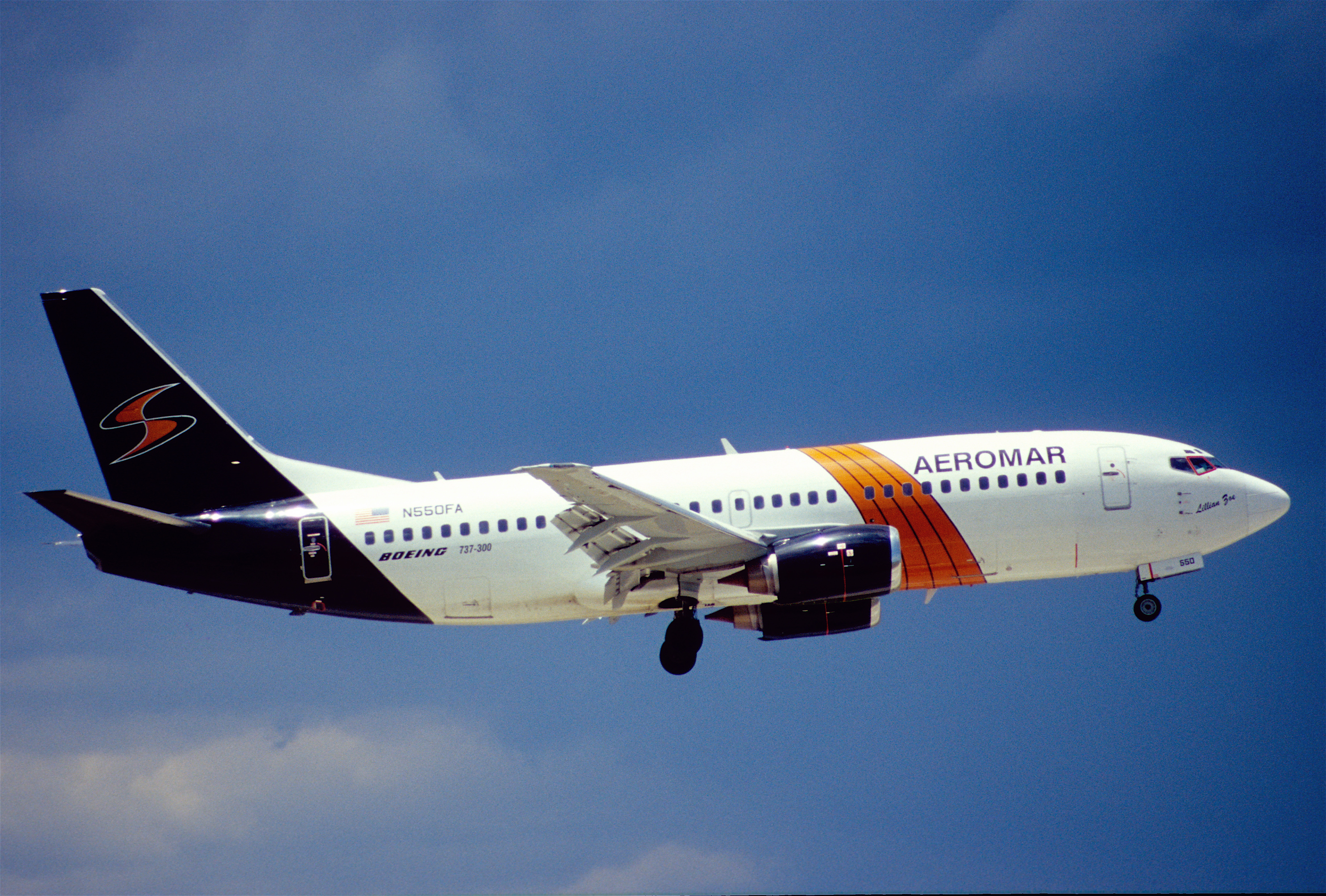
Aeromar Boeing 737-300 at Miami International Airport in 2003

The airline was founded as Aeromar Cargo in 1962 as an airfreight forwarder and all-cargo carrier. The airline was then established in 1998 as a passenger carrier by Raymundo Polanco Alegria to replace the defunct Dominicana de Aviación. Polanco-Alegria was an Air Force military commander and a key figure in the Rebellion of the Pilots movement in November 1961, when military action was taken by a group of aviators to guarantee the democratic process after the death of the dictator Rafael Leonidas Trujillo

Aeromar services began with a single Boeing 727 leased from Falcon Air Express, for routes to Miami and San Juan. In 2001, it bought a Boeing 747 to a new route to Madrid, but the route was suspended 5 months later due to heavy competition with Iberia. In 2002, new services to New York, In 2003 The Airlines began to fly to Aruba, Havana and Caracas with Boeing 737, 757 and 767. In 2003, the airline ceased operations. Aeromar was the first airline to fly New York– Santiago, DR route in 2002.

== Routes ==
- Santo Domingo (SDQ) - New York (JFK)
- Santo Domingo (SDQ) - Miami (MIA)
- Santo Domingo (SDQ) - San Juan, PR (SJU)
- Santo Domingo (SDQ) - Aruba (AUA)
- Santo Domingo (SDQ) - Havana (HAV)
- Santiago (STI) - New York (JFK)
- Santiago (STI) - San Juan, PR (SJU)

== Destinations ==
- New York City (John F. Kennedy International Airport) Hub
- Miami (Miami International Airport) Focus city
- Madrid (Barajas International Airport) Service launched but ended a week later
- San Juan (Luis Muñoz Marín International Airport) 2002
- Caracas (Simón Bolívar International Airport)
- Havana (José Martí International Airport)
- Aruba (Queen Beatrix International Airport)
- Curaçao (Curaçao International Airport)

== Fleet ==
The Aeromar Líneas Aéreas Dominicanas fleet consists of the following aircraft:

Aeromar Líneas Aéreas Dominicanas fleet
Aircraft	Total	Introduced	Retired	Notes
Boeing 720	2	1979	1986	Leased from Agro Air
Boeing 727-200	3	1998	2001	Leased from Falcon Air Express and Allegro
Boeing 737-200	1	2003	2003	
Boeing 737-300	1	2003	2004	Leased from Falcon Air Express
Boeing 747-200B	1	2001	2002	
Boeing 757-200	2	2002	2003	Leased from Icelandair
Boeing 767-200	1	2002	2003	Leased from Air Atlanta Icelandic
Boeing 767-200ER	1	2003	2003	Leased from Air Atlanta Icelandic
Boeing 767-300ER	1	2002	2003	Leased from Air Atlanta Icelandic
Curtiss C-46 Commando	9	1967	1980	
Douglas DC-8-33F	3	1983	1985	
Douglas DC-8-51	1	1985	1986	
Douglas DC-8-54CF	2	1983	1986	

== See also ==
- List of defunct airlines of the Dominican Republic
