= Hispaniola Airways =

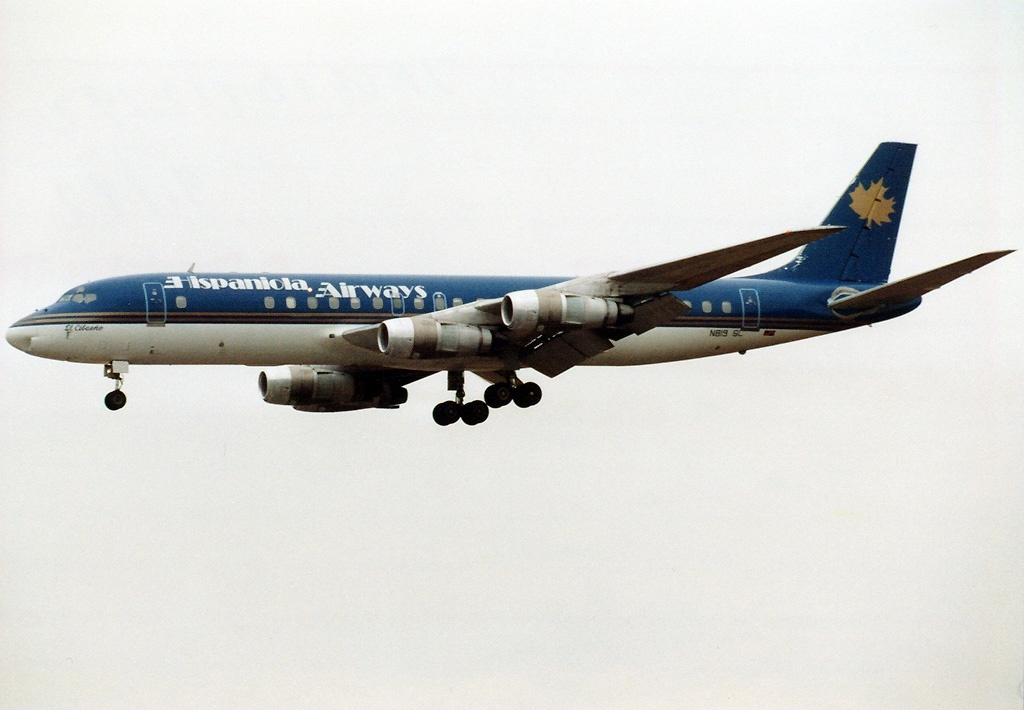
- A DC 8-55 of Hispaniola Airways
IATA	ICAO	Call sign
ZS	HIS	-
- Founded: 1981
- Ceased operations: 2000
- Operating bases: Puerto Plata La Union Airport

Hispaniola Airways was an airline from the Dominican Republic, that operated flights to Europe and the United States out of its base at Puerto Plata Airport. The company was founded in 1981 and disestablished in 2000. Hispaniola operated Boeing 707, Boeing 720, Douglas DC-8 and Sud Aviation Caravelle jetliners.

== Destinations ==
Hispaniola Airways offered scheduled passenger flights to the following destinations:

Dominican Republic

- Puerto Plata – Puerto Plata La Union Airport base

Spain

- Madrid – Barajas International Airport

United Kingdom

- London – London Heathrow Airport

United States of America

- Miami – Miami International Airport
- New York City – John F. Kennedy International Airport

== Incidents ==
On 16 December 1981 at 12:16 local time, a Hispaniola Airways Boeing 707 (registered HI-384HA) was damaged beyond repair when its right main landing gear collapsed upon landing at Miami International Airport. The aircraft had been on a positioning flight from Puerto Plata with only five crew members on board, none of which was severely injured.
