= HeavyLift International =

.

HeavyLift International was an aviation cargo airlines company that operated from Sharjah International Airport in the United Arab Emirates. It began operations in 2004 and ceased operations in 2011.

== Fleet ==
Its fleet consisted of the following planes:

Type	Fleet	Stored	Total
Boeing 737	2	0	2
Canadair CRJ-900	2	0	2
Douglas DC-8	2	1	3
Totals	6	1	7
