= Servicios Aéreos Profesionales =

Dominican airline

IATA	ICAO	Call sign
5S	PSV	PROSERVICIOS
- Founded: 1981
- Hubs: Santo Domingo-La Isabela
- Fleet size: 1
- Destinations: Charter
- Headquarters: Santo Domingo, Dominican Republic

Servicios Aéreos Profesionales, S.A., also known as SAP, was a charter airline that had its corporate headquarters and base at La Isabela International Airport in Santo Domingo, Dominican Republic.

== Fleet ==
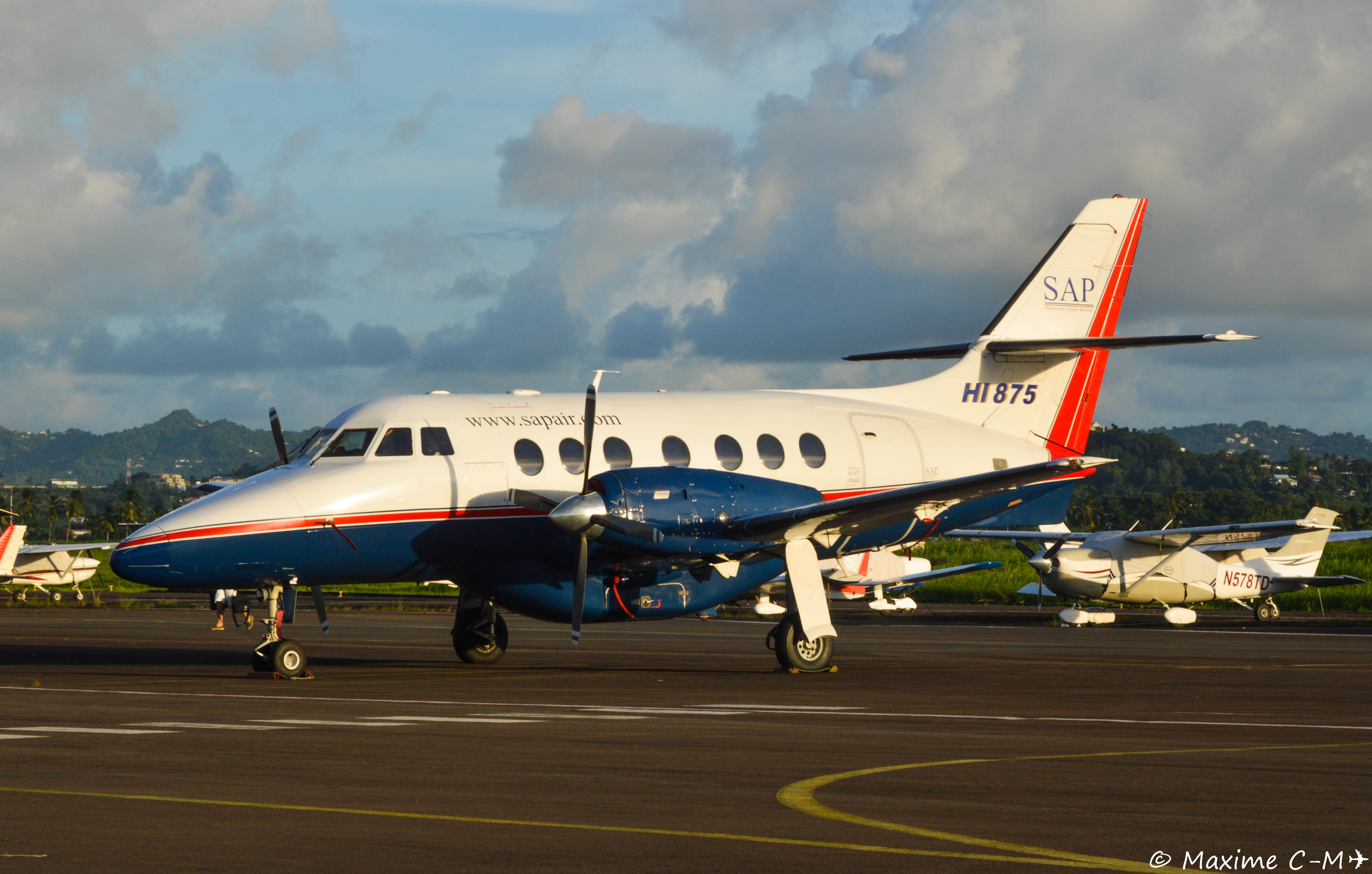
SAP BAe Jetstream 32 in 2016

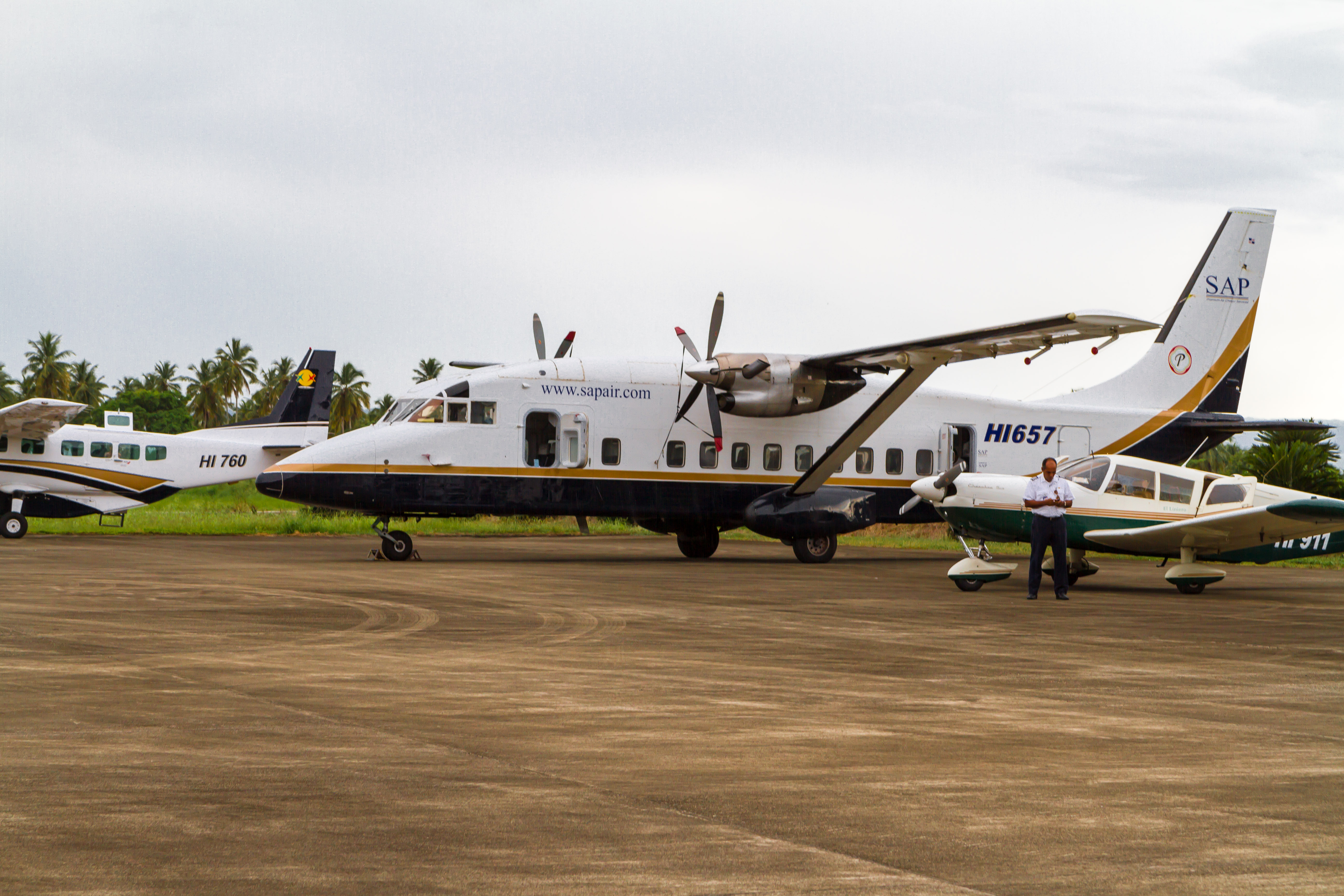
SAP Shorts 360 and Cessna 208 Caravan in 2013

=== Current fleet ===
As of April 2021, the SAP fleet included the following aircraft:

SAP fleet
Aircraft	In service	Passengers	Notes
Saab 340B	1	34	
Total	1		

=== Former fleet ===
SAP formerly also operated the following aircraft:

- 4 De Havilland Canada DHC-6 Twin Otter
- 1 Embraer EMB 120 Brasilia

== See also ==
- List of airlines of the Dominican Republic
