= La Isabela International Airport =

Airport serving Santo Domingo, Dominican Republic

La Isabela International Airport Dr. Joaquín Balaguer International Airport Aeropuerto Internacional Dr. Joaquin Balaguer
- IATA: JBQ; ICAO: MDJB

Summary
- Airport type: Public
- Operator: Aerodrom
- Serves: Santo Domingo
- Location: El Higuero, Santo Domingo
- Opened: 23 February 2006; 20 years ago
- Hub for: Air Century
- Time zone: Eastern Caribbean Time (UTC−04:00)
- Elevation AMSL: 98 ft (30 m)
- Coordinates: 18°34′20″N 069°59′08″W

Map
- Location of airport in Dominican Republic

Runways
Direction	Length		Surface
Direction	ft	m	Surface
01/19	5,443	1,659	Asphalt
- Source: Skyvector, GCM

Dr. Joaquín Balaguer International Airport (IATA: JBQ, ICAO: MDJB) — also known as La Isabela International Airport — is an international airport in the Dominican Republic, serving as a secondary airport for Santo Domingo. It is located at El Higuero, about 10 km (6.2 mi) northwest of the city. It opened on 23 February 2006 to replace the Herrera International Airport. It is named after former Dominican president Joaquín Balaguer.

== History ==
La Isabela airport opened on 23 February 2006 as a second airport in the city of Santo Domingo. It was designed to replace the Herrera International Airport, and is known as Dr. Joaquín Balaguer Airport, named after Dominican president Joaquín Balaguer. The airport is owned and operated by Aeropuertos Dominicanos Siglo XXI (Aerodom). In 2015, VINCI Airports acquired the company, which had permission from the Government of the Dominican Republic to operate the airport until March 2030. In 2023, the contract between the government and VINCI Airports were extended for another 30 years after 2030.

== Location ==
THe airport is located in the locality of El Higuero in the municipality of Santo Domingo. It is situated approximately 10 km (6.2 mi) northwest of the city center.

== Infrastructure ==
The airport has a single asphalt runway, measuring 1,659 m (5,443 ft) in length and 30 m (98 ft) in width. It is equipped for IFR approach. It has two taxiways and a parking apron spread over an area of 21,600 m^{2} (233,000 sq ft). The parking area is capable of accommodating four small aircraft such as the ATR-72. The Air Traffic Control operates from a 36 m (118 ft)-high control tower in the airport.

The airport has a single passenger terminal with a carpet area of 5,424 m^{2} (58,380 sq ft). Spread across two levels, it houses commercial shops, airline offices, government and administrative offices, food court, parking and taxi rental areas. Further facilities including a cafe, and duty free shops were added in 2020.

== Airlines and Destinations ==
La Isabela Airport primarily serves as an airport for domestic flights operating within the country. It is a hub for private and charter airlines that operate small aircraft.

Airlines	Destinations
Air Century	Aruba, Cartagena, Curaçao, Havana, Santiago de Cuba, Sint Maarten; Seasonal: Bonaire
Sunrise Airways	Port-au-Prince
