= Arroyo Barril Airport =

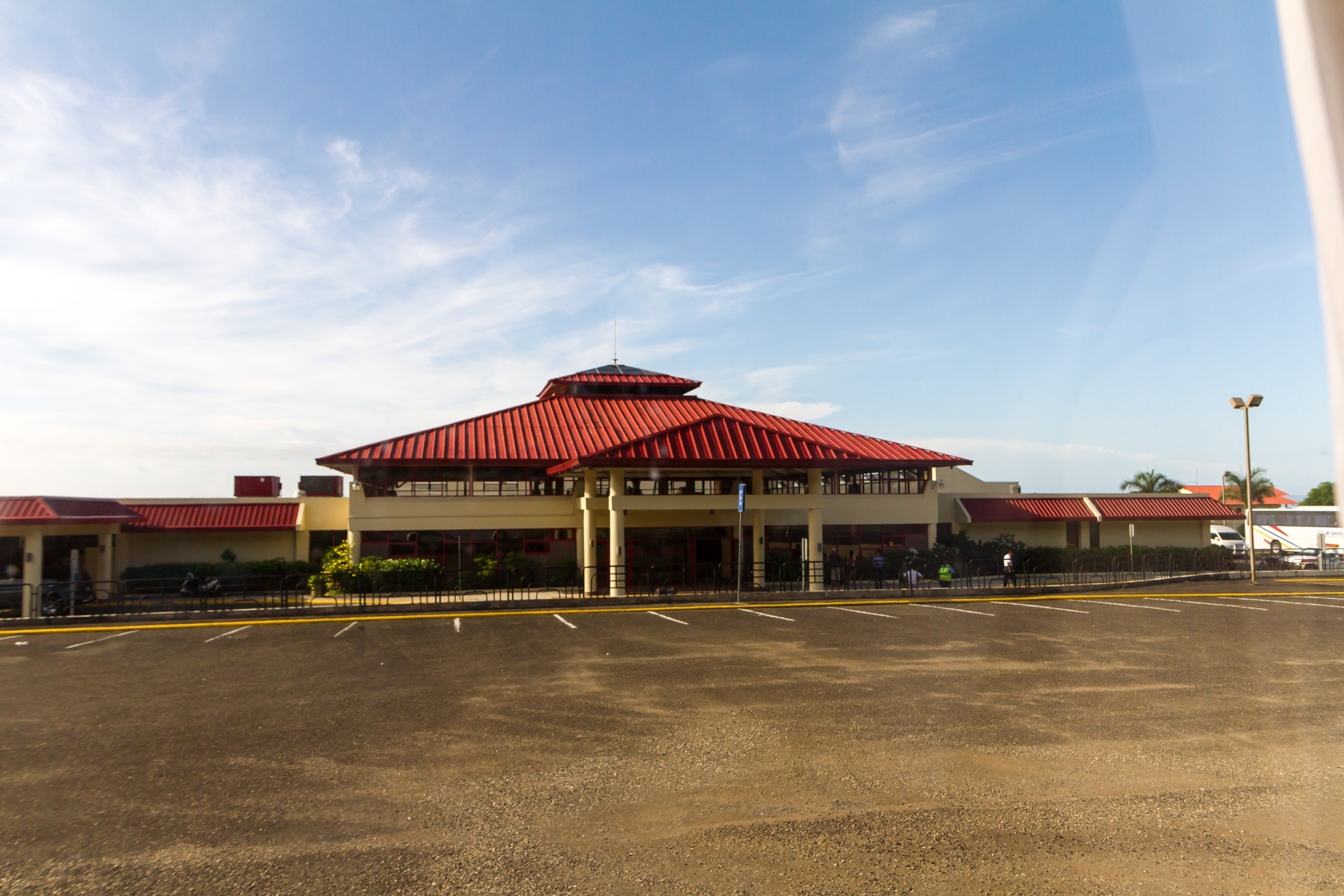
- IATA: EPS; ICAO: MDAB

Summary
- Airport type: Public
- Serves: Samaná, Dominican Republic
- Location: Las Pascualas
- Elevation AMSL: 57 ft / 17 m
- Coordinates: 19°11′55″N 69°25′50″W

Map
- Location of the airport in the Dominican Republic

Runways
Direction	Length		Surface
Direction	m	ft	Surface
11/29	1,400	4,593	Asphalt

Statistics (Jan-Nov 2011)
- Passengers: 2,300 approx.
- Source: AIP GCM Google Maps

Arroyo Barril International Airport (IATA: EPS, ICAO: MDAB) is a domestic airport located in the Samaná Province of the Dominican Republic. Regulated by the Dominican Institute of Civil Aviation (IDAC), the facility is restricted to daytime operations and is managed by Aeropuertos Dominicanos Siglo XXI (Aerodom) under a long-term concession agreement extending through 2060.

Originally inaugurated as an international airport by the government in 1994, Arroyo Barril was eventually reclassified as an exclusively domestic aerodrome. This reclassification occurred because its runway and apron were too small to accommodate large commercial aircraft, prompting Aerodom to construct the nearby Samaná El Catey International Airport in 2007.

== Location ==
The airport is located in the Samaná Province, situated at the geographic coordinates of 19° 12’ N and 069° 26’ W. The facility operates at an elevation of 17.5 meters (57 feet) above sea level It has an asphalt runway oriented at 11/29 magnetic degrees, which measures 1,300 meters in length by 25 meters in width. Operating under the authority of the Dominican Institute of Civil Aviation (IDAC), the airport is restricted to daytime hours (HJ) and is authorized exclusively or domestic flights.

iIts ICAO airport code is MDAB, and other nearby airports include Samaná El Catey International Airport, Consuelo Batey Anita Airport, Los Llanos de Sabanatosa Airport, La Romana Batey Lechuga Airport, and Angelina field.

== Operational ==
At first, the government officially announced in 1994 that Arroyo Barril Airport would be designated an international airport. Then, it was leased to Aeropuertos Dominicanos Siglo XXI (Aerodom) under a 30-year concession beginning in 2000. Because the airport's runway and apron were too small to accommodate large commercial planes, Aerodom invested US$80 million to build the Samaná El Catey International Airport in 2007, which led the government to reclassify Arroyo Barril to serve only domestic flights. In 2023, the airport concession was extended for more than 30 years to Aerodom, originally set to end in 2030, and now runs through 2060.

The passenger declined over the years, dropping from 13,456 travelers in 2016 to just 769 in 2019.

== See also ==
- Transport in Dominican Republic
- List of airports in Dominican Republic
