= Víctor Pacheco =

Víctor Pacheco may refer to:

- Víctor Pacheco (footballer, born 1972), Uruguayan footballer
- Víctor Pacheco (footballer, born 1974), Colombian footballer
- Víctor Pacheco (businessman) (born 1982), Dominican businessman
- Víctor Pacheco (zoologist), Peruvian mammalogist
