= Riverside Military Academy =

Coordinates: 34.32888°N 83.83311°W

Location
- 2001 Riverside Drive; 2001 Riverside Dr, Gainesville, GA 30501; Gainesville, Georgia 30501; United States; 34.33250035557361, -83.83258727664011Location of Lanier Hall

Information
- Former name: Riverside Preparatory Academy
- Type: Private Military Boarding School
- Motto: Mens Sana In Corpore Sano (A sound mind in a sound body)
- Established: 1907
- President: Nizar Zakka
- Dean: Steve Hadaway
- Grades: 6–12
- Gender: Boys & Girls
- Enrollment: 111 (2026-2027)
- Capacity: 600 (dorm capacity)
- Student to teacher ratio: 8:1
- Campus size: 206 Acres
- Mascot: Eagle
- Nickname: Riverside Military, RMA
- Accreditation: SAIS
- Yearbook: Bayonet
- Tuition: $61,200
- Website: https://www.riversidemilitary.org/

Riverside Military Academy is a private, college preparatory, boarding and day school for boys and girls in grades 6 through 12 in Gainesville, Georgia, United States.

== History ==
The school was founded as Riverside Military Academy in 1907 by local professors and businessmen Heywood Jefferson Pearce and Azor Warner Van Hoose with the mission of preparing ethical young men for success in college and life.

1911 Riverside Preparatory Academy Yearbook showing Pearce as secretary of the board of directors.

Riverside opened its doors in the fall of 1908. It gained some prominence after 1913, when a young professor from Stone Mountain, Georgia, Edgar Dunlap "Sandy" Beaver became the director of the school's Academics and Military Department, expanding the campus to 25 acres.

Riverside opened a winter campus in Hollywood, Florida, in 1931. It was briefly used as a Naval Air Gunners School during World War II. It was sold in 1984.

The Gainesville campus underwent renovations from 1997 until 2004, adding a barracks building, academics building, gymnasium, and a library and performing arts center.

In 2022, the school rebranded as Riverside Preparatory Academy to emphasize its rigorous academic program, holding on to a modified military mission.

The school has maintained its military college-preparatory identity for over a century, celebrating its centennial of continued accreditation in 2022, having originally receiving accreditation in 1922.

In August of 2026, Nizar Zakka was appointed president of Riverside Military Academy, ushering in a new phase of institutional leadership.He is a Riverside alumnus from the class of 1985.

On August 10th, 2026, Riverside Military Academy and its board of trustees announced a multi-year transformation aiming to be America's premier military boarding academy, with the ambition to become a globally recognized leader in military education.

This decision came after a Bloomberg report published on August 18th, 2026 described the financial difficulties of the school, showing declining attendance from 509 students (2019) to 180 students (2024) to 111 students (2026), an $8 million operational deficit (2025) and a net loss of $17 million in net assets. Riverside defaulted on its municipal bond debt in 2025, entering on a forbearance agreement in 2026, arranging an additional $8 million junior loan to address the missed bond payments.

The immediate financial deadline for the school is August 31st, 2027.

=== The Summit on the Future of U.S. Military Education ===
Between the dates of October 15th and 18th of 2026, Riverside Military Academy announced a Summit to gather and discuss the future of American military education to shape the next chapter of Riverside Military Academy.

The closing address of the summit had former U.S. Ambassador to Tunisia and Board of Trustees member, Joey Robert Hood, announce that the conclusion of the summit was to "bring Riverside Military Academy to the world" by establishing two satellite campuses overseas to enroll students in 9th and 10th grade, sending them to the Gainesville campus for their 11th and 12th grade years. Explaining this "will be a shot in the arm [for RMA] financially."

== Awards ==
Riverside Preparatory Academy won "Best Band" by virtual appearance in the Atlanta Veteran's Day Parade in 2020.

Riverside Preparatory Academy's Army JROTC Raiders Team has won national championships.

Riverside Preparatory Academy won its 10th consecutive Atlanta Veterans Day "Presidents' Trophy" in 2019.

The Riverside Preparatory Academy Track & Field team was crowned 2018 GHSA state champions.

== Notable Alumni ==
- Félix Arturo González Canto, governor of the Mexican state of Quintana Roo (1986)
- James Earl Carter Sr., father of U.S. President Jimmy Carter (Attended 1911)
- Tyler Carter, former clean vocalist of the metalcore bands Woe, Is Me and Issues
- Khalid Duke, college football defensive end for the Kansas State Wildcats
- CeeLo Green (Thomas DeCarlo Callaway), singer-songwriter, rapper, record producer and actor
- Bobby Greenwood, professional golfer (Attended 1957)
- David L. McDonald, U.S. Chief of Naval Operations during the Vietnam War (1924)
- Victor Miguel Pacheco Mendez, President of AraJet
- Victor Oscar Pacheco Mendez, CEO of Grupo VOPM; founder of Panacrédito
- Arturo "Chico" O'Farrill, composer, arranger, and conductor (1938)
- Offset (Kiari Kendrell Cephus), American rapper part of rapper group, Migos (Attended 2008)
- Patrick O'Neal, actor
- George P. Oslin, inventor of the singing telegram (1913)
- Luis M. Proenza, university president (1962)
- Tommy Prothro, football coach (1938)
- Johnny Riddle, baseball player (1926)
- Red Sanders, football coach (1923)
- Everett Strupper, leading scorer in the Georgia Tech 222, Cumberland 0 football game of 1916; member of the College Football Hall of Fame (1914)
- Douglass Watson, soap opera actor (1938)
- David Duke, former member of Louisiana House of Representatives
