= Azor Warner Van Hoose =

American educator (1860–1921)

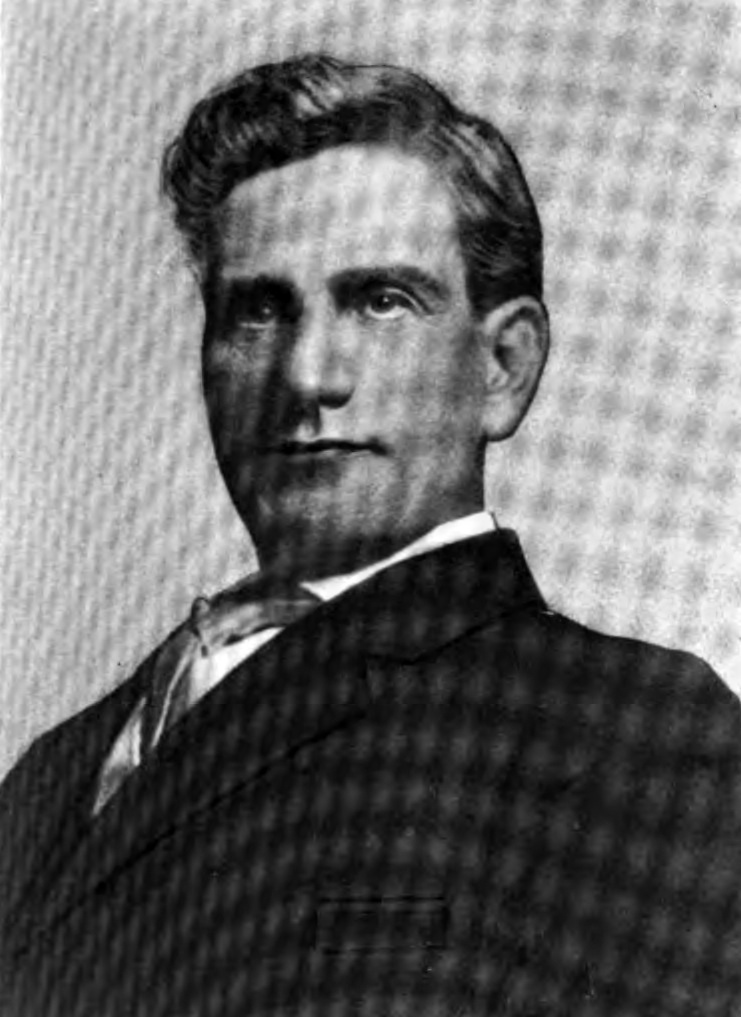

6th President of Shorter College
- In office 1910–1921
- Preceded by: Luther Rice Gwaltney
- Succeeded by: William D. Furry

2nd President of Brenau College
- In office 1886–1910
- Preceded by: W. C. Wilkes
- Succeeded by: H. J. Pearce

1st President of Gainesville College
- In office 1885–1886
- Preceded by: Position established
- Succeeded by: Position merged

Personal details
- Born: 31 December 1860 Griffin, Georgia, United States
- Died: 11 December 1921 (aged 60) Rome, Georgia, United States
- Spouse: Lucy Rucker (m. 1887; died 1949)
- Children: 5
- Education: University of Georgia

Azor Warner Van Hoose (31 December 1860 – 11 December 1921) was an American educator most known as being the President of both Brenau University and Shorter University. Together with H. J. Pearce, they co-founded the Riverside Military Academy in Gainesville.

== Early life and education ==
Azor Warner Van Hoose was born on 31 December 1860, (Note: Some sources give the date of birth as 31 October 1860.) in Griffin, Georgia, to Baptist minister Azor Van Hoose and Missouri Frances Daniel. He attended a school in Winchester, Tennessee and returned to Georgia to teach at a country school. He then entered the University of Georgia and subsequently graduated in 1882.

== Career ==
After graduating, he stayed at the University to work as a chemistry instructor. He was then appointed Professor of Mathematics and taught at South Georgia College in Thomasville for one year. Next, he became Professor of Mathematics and Latin at Howard College (now called Samford University) in Marion, Alabama, from 1883 to 1884. He was then hired to be an adjunct Professor of Chemistry and Latin at the University of Georgia from 1884 to 1885. Van Hoose resigned as professor in 1885 despite protests from his friends not to leave.

He left to Gainesville and founded and became President of Gainesville College for about one year. While serving his tenure, he saw that the Georgia Baptist Female Seminary was to be sold after being closed for debt for eight months. Seeing the opportunity, he purchased the seminary in 1886 and merged it with the college to become Georgia Female Seminary, serving as its President that same year. In 1892, he was made a member of the Board of Examinations at the University of Georgia. As the school steadily increased in numbers, Van Hoose sold one-half interest to Professor H. J. Pearce to help run the school as its co-President and for more capital. In 1900, the school changed its name to Brenau College.

In 1907, together with Pearce, they built the Riverside Military Academy at Gainesville, becoming joint owners for several years. Van Hoose left the College in 1909 and went to Rome, Georgia to be the President of Shorter College in 1910 with the promise of support from its people. He served as President of Shorter up until his death. He was awarded an honorary degree of LL.D. by Mercer University in 1911 because of his services in Shorter.

Van Hoose died on 11 December 1921 in Rome, Georgia.

== Personal life and family ==
Van Hoose was said to be a Baptist and a Freemason who joined Masonic fraternities of the Georgia Historical Society and the National Economic League. He was also a member of the Sigma Alpha Epsilon fraternity. Although not taking part in politics, he is said to be a Democrat. He believes in the advantages of Christian education and "a personal modesty so great that he neither will talk about his work nor claim personal credit for it."

In 1887, Van Hoose married Lucy Rucker and had five children together, all of whom died in infancy.
