= Tom Polger =

Tom Polger is a professor in the Department of Philosophy at the University of Cincinnati in the United States. His research focuses on naturalistic accounts of the metaphysics of mind. Polger is a past president of the Southern Society for Philosophy and Psychology.

== Publications ==
Books

- Polger, T. 2004. Natural Minds. Cambridge, MA: The MIT Press
- Polger, Thomas W. (2016). Multiple realization book. New York, NY: Oxford University Press. ISBN 978-0-19-873289-1.

Articles and chapters

- Polger, T. 2009. "Two Confusions Concerning Multiple Realizability". Philosophy of Science 75 (5): 537–547.
- Polger, T. 2009. "Evaluating the Evidence for Multiple Realization". Synthese 167 (3): 457–472.
- Polger, T. 2009. "Identity Theories". Philosophy Compass,4 (4): 1-13. (survey article)
- Polger, T. 2009. "As a Good Bartender Might: Whiskey and Natural Kinds". Whisk(e)y & Philosophy, F. Allhoff and M. Adams (eds.), Blackwell: 179–194.
- Polger, T. and L. Shapiro. 2008. "Understanding the Dimensions of Realization". Journal of Philosophy, CV (4): 213–222.
- Polger, T. 2008. H2O, ‘Water’, and Transparent Reduction. Erkenntnis, 69 (1): 109–130.
- Polger, T. 2008. "Computational Functionalism". In The Routledge Companion to the Philosophy of Psychology, P. Calvo and J. Symons (eds.), London: Routledge.
- Polger, T. 2007. "Realization and the Metaphysics of Mind". Australasian Journal of Philosophy, 85 (2): 233–259.
- Polger, T. 2007. "Rethinking the Evolution of Consciousness". In The Blackwell Companion to Consciousness, M. Velmans and S. Schneider (eds.), Blackwell Publishers.
- Polger, T. 2006. Some Metaphysical Anxieties of Reductionism. In The Matter of the Mind: Philosophical Essays on Psychology, Neuroscience and Reduction, M. Schouten and H. Looren de Jong (eds.), Blackwell Publishers.
- Polger, T. 2006. A Place for Dogs and Trees? An Essay on Gregg Rosenberg's, A Place for Consciousness. Psyche 12 (5): 1-20.
- Polger, T. and K. Sufka. 2006. Closing the Gap on Pain: Mechanism, Theory, and Fit. In New Essays on the Nature of Pain and the Methodology of its Study, M. Aydede (ed.). Cambridge, MA: The MIT Press.
- Polger, T. 2004. Neural Machinery and Realization. Philosophy of Science. 71 (5): 997–1006.
- Polger, T. 2002. Putnam's Intuition. Philosophical Studies, 109, 2: 143–170.
- Polger, T. and O. Flanagan. 2002. Consciousness, Adaptation and Epiphenomenalism. In Consciousness Evolving, J. Fetzer (Ed). Amsterdam: John Benjamins.
- Polger, T. and O. Flanagan. 2001. A Decade of Teleofunctionalism: Lycan's Consciousness and Consciousness and Experience. Minds and Machines, 11, 1: 113–126. (Review essay, with a reply from William Lycan, “Response to Polger and Flanagan,” pp. 127–132.)
- Polger, T. 2000. Zombies Explained. In Dennett's Philosophy: A Comprehensive Assessment, D. Ross, A. Brook, and D. Thompson (Eds). Cambridge, MA: The MIT Press. (With a reply from Daniel Dennett, “With a Little Help from My Friends.”)
- Purves, D., Lotto, B., and T. Polger. 2000. Color Vision and the Four- Color-Map Problem. Journal of Cognitive Neuroscience, 12, 2: 233–237.
- Polger, T. and O. Flanagan. 1999. Natural Answers to Natural Questions. In Where Biology Meets Psychology: Philosophical Essays, V. Hardcastle (Ed). Cambridge, MA: The MIT Press.
- Flanagan, O. and T. Polger. 1995. Zombies and the Function of Consciousness. Journal of Consciousness Studies, 2, 4: 313–321. (With replies by Dennett, Güzeldere, Lanier, Bringsjord, Moody
