= Ed Schrader =

American academic

Ed L. Schrader was the president of Brenau University, a university and women's college in Gainesville, Georgia established in 1878, from 2005 to 2019. He is a geologist by profession.

== Early life and education ==
He is a native of Mississippi. He received a B.S. in geology, with a minor in chemistry, from Millsaps College (Jackson, Mississippi) in 1973. In 1975 he received an M.S. degree from the University of Tennessee. He earned a Ph.D. in geochemistry from Duke University in 1977.

== Career ==
From 1978 to 1980 he taught at the University of Alabama in Tuscaloosa, then worked for several corporations including Chevron Resources Company, J. M. Huber Corporation, United Catalysts/Sud-Chemie A.G., and Diversified Minerals Corporation (president, 1987–88). He taught at Millsaps College for twelve years, starting in 1988 as assistant professor of geology. In 1992 he became chair of the Geology Department, and from 1995 to 2000 he was Associate Dean of Sciences and Professor of Geology. From 2000 to 2005 he served as president of Shorter University in Rome, Georgia. From 2005 to 2019 he was president of Brenau University.

Schrader has written extensively for both academic and non-academic publications. He has authored 64 scholarly presentations and 34 peer-reviewed publications. He also has served as associate editor for Environmental Geology, an international scientific journal. Schrader is a founding member of the Phi Kappa Phi honor society at Brenau and of the Mississippi Alpha chapter of Phi Beta Kappa at Millsaps.

== Tenure at Brenau ==
During Schrader’s presidency, the university experienced a more than 30 percent growth in enrollment, expanded facilities significantly, and added four terminal degrees and other graduate programs. Brenau expanded its footprint from the historic 55-acre campus in Gainesville to the Brenau East facility about a mile from the main campus and in 2013 to the Brenau Downtown Center on the city square. A new athletics complex, known as the Ernest Ledford Grindle Athletics Park, about a mile from campus opened its first phase in 2017. Campuses in Fairburn, Georgia, and in Jacksonville, Florida, were added in addition to existing campuses in Augusta and Norcross, which have been expanded significantly. A large, state-of-the-art human anatomy lab for use in undergraduate and graduate health sciences and biology studies was completed in the Downtown Center in 2015. On the historic campus, construction of four new sorority houses and a large general residence hall was completed in 2016.

In 2014 the People’s Republic of China approved an agreement between Brenau University and Anhui Normal University for a joint degree program in early childhood teacher education. Designed to bring Chinese students to Georgia starting in 2016, the 2+2 partnership allows students who have completed the first two years of their degree program at Anhui Normal University to complete the final two years of their undergraduate educations at Brenau. The first cohort of students from ANU arrived at Brenau in 2016 as juniors in the early childhood teacher education program and graduated in 2018 with degrees from both institutions. In 2017, another 2+2 partnership was added, bringing English majors from ANU.

In 2011 Schrader was elected to the board of directors of the Southern Association of Colleges and Schools Commission on Colleges, and re-elected to a second term in 2014. He also was appointed to a Washington-based Council of Independent Colleges 22-member blue-ribbon panel of U.S. college presidents. The panel was charged with developing a plan that encourages independent colleges and universities to revitalize their missions and business models to be more responsive to needs of future students. He also has served as a member of the boards of directors for several organizations, including the National Association of Intercollegiate Athletics, Elachee Nature and Science Center, Georgia Chamber of Commerce, Georgia Independent Colleges Association and the Atlanta Regional Consortium of Higher Education. He is a member of the student finance committee of the National Association of Colleges and Universities. Schrader is a founding director of Kaxil Kiuic Biocultural Reserve, Mérida, Yucatán, Mexico, and he previously served for 10 years as a member of the Board of Visitors of Duke University for the Department of Earth Sciences.

== Personal ==
He and his wife, Myra, a former mathematics professor, reside in Gainesville, Georgia. They have two adult children, Melanie, an obstetrician and gynecologist, and Edward, a dentist, as well as four granddaughters.
