= Li Zhaozheng =

Chinese writer

- Born: 1954; Shanghai, Jiading District
- Died: 2003 (aged 48–49); Shanghai
- Education: University
- Alma mater: Anhui Normal University
- Occupations: Writer, teacher
- Writing career
- Genre: Novel
- Notable works: 《女工》 《永远不说再见》 《傻女香香》 《城市生活》
- Notable awards: 百花文学奖; 1997年 《女工》 百花文学奖; 2003年 《永远不说再见》 百花文学奖; 2005年 《傻女香香》

Li Zhaozheng (1954–2003) was a writer born in Shanghai, China.

== Early life and education ==
Li Zhaozheng graduated from Anhui Normal University in 1983 and worked as a Chinese language teacher.

He began publishing his works in the 1980s, including two long novels, 15 short stories, and 58 novellas, winning 3 literature awards in the process.

Writer Wang Anyi described Li as "A true and irreplaceable narrator of the lives of the grassroot people in this city (Shanghai)."

== Death ==
He died in March 2003 due to a sudden heart attack, at the age of 49.

== Published works ==
=== Novels ===
- The Silent Ending (1997)
- The Restless City (1999)

=== Novellas ===
- The Female Worker (1995)
- The Top Priority (1997)
- The Merchant (1998)
- Urban Life (1998)
- Twisted (1999)
- Miss in the Pavilion (1999)
- Ancestry (2002)
- Never Say Goodbye (2002)
- Silly Girl Xiangxiang (2003)
- Wind and Moon Flowing in Shanghai (2003).

=== Short stories ===
- The Story of Ahu

== Awards ==
- In 1997, The Female Worker won the Mid-Length Novel Award at the 7th Hundred Flowers Awards presented by Novel Monthly.
- In 2003, Never Say Goodbye received the Mid-Length Novel Award at the 10th Hundred Flowers Awards.
- In 2005, Silly Girl Xiangxiang was awarded the Mid-Length Novel Award at the 11th Hundred Flowers Awards.
