= Albert Lefevre =

American psychologist (1873–1928)

- Born: October 4, 1873; Baltimore, Maryland, USA
- Died: December 18, 1928 (aged 55); Charlottesville, Virginia, USA
- Education: University of Texas at Austin; Cornell University
- Occupation: Psychologist

Albert Lefevre (1873–1928) was an American psychologist.

== Early life ==
Lefevre was born on October 4, 1873, in Baltimore, Maryland. He received a bachelor's degree and a master's degree from the University of Texas at Austin. He studied at Johns Hopkins University, before transferring to Cornell University, where he received a PhD in Psychology in 1898. He completed his studies by spending two years in Berlin, Germany, from 1898 to 1900.

== Career ==
Lefevre taught psychology at Cornell University from 1900 to 1903. He then taught psychology at Tulane University from 1903 to 1905. He joined the faculty at the University of Virginia in 1905, where he taught until his death in 1928.

He served as the third president of the Southern Society for Philosophy and Psychology in 1910. He was a member of the American Philosophical Society. He was the associate editor of The Philosophical Review and the Virginia Quarterly Review.

He was the recipient of an honorary doctorate of laws from the University of South Carolina in 1905.

== Death ==
Lefevre was operated for appendicitis in November 1928. He died on December 18, 1928, in Charlottesville, Virginia. His 1928 portrait is stored in the Special Collection at the University of Virginia Library.

== Works ==
- The ethical system of Bishop Butler (Cornell, New York: Cornell University Press, 1898).
- Immanuel Kant; his life and doctrine. (New York, C. Scribner, 1902).
