= Victor Oscar Pacheco Mendez =

Dominican business executive

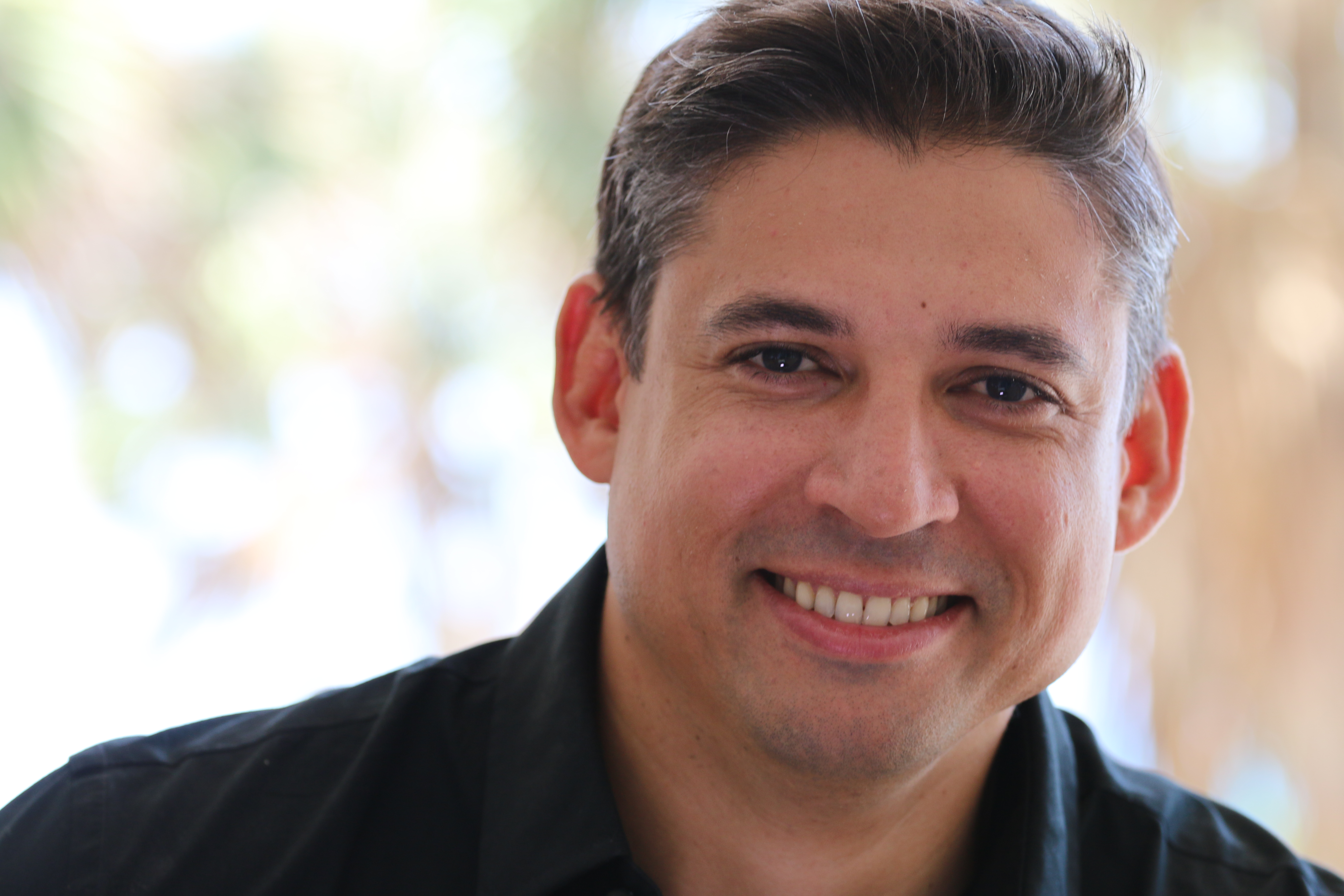
- Born: 1980 (age 45–46); Atlanta, Georgia, United States
- Occupation: Business executive
- Known for: CEO of Grupo VOPM

Victor Oscar Pacheco Mendez is a Dominican business executive. He was born in 1980 in Atlanta, Georgia, United States. With his family he moved to the Dominican Republic, where he grew up with the strong influence of his grandfather Victor Mendez Capellan who owned a large financial business in the Dominican Republic, where Mendez would later work.

== Education ==
Pacheco completed elementary school at the Carol Morgan School in Santo Domingo. When his family returned to Georgia in 1998, he attended Riverside Military Academy for middle school and high school before returning to the Dominican Republic to earn an MBA from Universidad Iberoamericana.

== Career ==
During high school, Mendez started to work at Grupo Vimenca, the family business founded by his grandfather, where he remained for ten years working in different fields such as communications and logistics.

In 2009, he decided to launch his own project and created Panacrédito, an online lending company, In 2014, together with partners, he created Grupo VOPM, a "virtual operating model" Latin American Internet group with development teams in Cuba, Chile, the United States, and the Dominican Republic. He also created Llamundo, a telecommunications company, and in 2019 he created Credigo, with the mission of providing smartphone financing to all people, regardless of their socio-economic level, credit history or nationality.
