= J. Macbride Sterrett =

American philosopher

J. Macbride Sterrett (1847–1923) was an American philosopher.

== Early life ==
J. Macbride Sterrett was born in 1847.

== Career ==
Mcbride was a philosopher. His major works were on Christian apologetics, Hegel, and the British Empiricists. He served as the second President of the Southern Society for Philosophy and Psychology in 1909.

He taught at Columbian College (which changed its name to George Washington University in 1904) from 1892 to 1909. In 1909, he was dismissed by the university, thus being banned from joining its pension plan. However, the Carnegie Foundation for the Advancement of Teaching gave him a pension, and stopped their donations to the university in retaliation.

== Death ==
He died in 1923.

== Works ==
- Apologetics in the pulpit. Opening paper in a discussion at the S.E. Convocation, Mankato, Minn., Nov. 20, 1889 (Virginia Seminary Magazine, March–April, 1890).
- Studies in Hegel's Philosophy of religion with a chapter on Christian unity in America (New York : D. Appleton, 1890).
- The sensational idealism of Locke, Berkeley, and Hume (Washington, D.C. : The George Washington University, 1904).
- The freedom of authority : essays in apologetics (New York : Macmillan, 1905).
