= Edward Franklin Buchner =

- Born: September 3, 1868; Paxton, Illinois, USA
- Died: August 22, 1929 (aged 60); Munich, Germany
- Education: Leander Clark College; Yale University
- Occupation: Academic
- Spouse: Hannah Louise Cable
- Children: 2 daughters, 2 sons

Edward Franklin Buchner (1868–1929) was an American academic and scholar in education studies.

== Early life ==
Edward Franklin Buchner was born on September 3, 1868, in Paxton, Illinois. He attended Leander Clark College and graduated from Yale University, where he received a PhD in 1893.

== Career ==
Buchner was Professor of Education at the University of Alabama from 1903 to 1908. He became Professor of Education at Johns Hopkins University in 1908. He wrote research in education studies. In 1925, he helped create the master of education and doctor of education degrees at Johns Hopkins.

He wrote A Study of Kant's Psychology in 1893 and translated Immanuel Kant's 1803 Lecture-Notes on Pedagogy and published them in 1908.

Buchner served as the fourth president of the Southern Society for Philosophy and Psychology in 1911.

== Personal life ==
Buchner married Hannah Louise Cable in 1898. They had two sons, Edward F. Buchner, Jr. and Mallory Buchner, and two daughters, Elizabeth Sanford Buchner and Margaret Louise Buchner.

== Death ==
He died of heart disease on August 22, 1929, in Munich, Germany.
