= Brenau University =

Private university in Gainesville, Georgia, US

- Former name: Brenau College (1878–1992)
- Motto: As Gold Refined By Fire
- Type: Private university
- Established: 1878; 148 years ago
- Endowment: $66.4 million (2025)
- President: David Barnett
- Faculty: 133
- Students: 3,500+
- Location: Gainesville, Georgia, United States; 34.304°N 83.819°W
- Campus: Urban
- Colors: Gold & Black
- Nickname: Golden Tigers
- Sporting affiliations: NAIA – Appalachian
- Mascot: HJ
- Website: www.brenau.edu

Brenau University is a private university in Gainesville, Georgia. Founded in 1878, the university enrolls more than 2,800 students from approximately 48 states and 17 foreign countries who seek degrees ranging from associate through doctoral degrees. The main campus of the Georgia-based institution includes the Brenau Women's College. Brenau also offers another location in Norcross, Georgia.

== History ==
- Brenau College District
- U.S. National Register of Historic Places
- U.S. Historic district
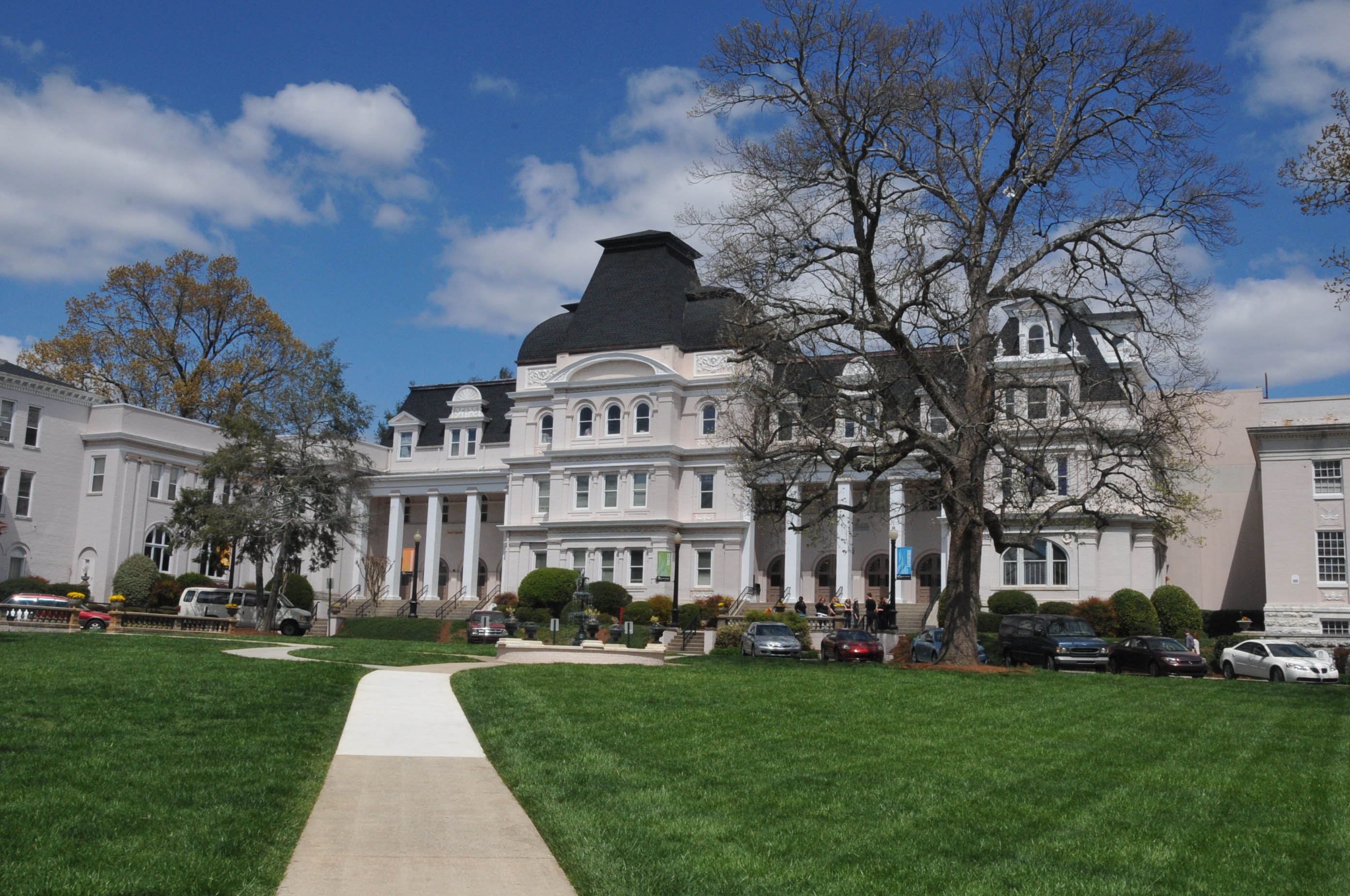
- Pearce Auditorium

- Location within Georgia Location within the United States
- Location: Bounded by Academy St. E, Prior St. NE, Washington St. SE, and Boulevard
- Coordinates: 34.3033°N 83.8219°W
- Area: 20.2 acres (8.2 ha)
- Built: 1878–1920
- Architectural style: Queen Anne, Second Empire, Classical Revival
- NRHP reference No.: 78000987
- Added to NRHP: August 24, 1978

Brenau was founded in 1878 as a private institution for the education of women. W.C. Wilkes, the institution's first administrator, is credited with building many of the historic buildings that still stand today. Although founders initially called the institution Georgia Baptist Female Seminary, it has never been affiliated with or governed by any religious organization. Through the years Brenau evolved from a proprietary college to a not-for-profit institution governed by an independent board of trustees. Although the residential undergraduate Brenau Women's College remains, other undergraduate programs on campuses, and all graduate and online programs, admit both men and women.

In 1900, H. J. Pearce purchased the institution and renamed it Brenau, a linguistic blend formed from the German word brennen, "to burn", and the Latin aurum, "gold". Its motto is "As Gold Refined by Fire". Brenau College remained privately owned until 1911 when a board of trustees assumed stewardship of the college, as remains the case today. In 1928, Brenau created a female, residential, college-preparatory school serving grades 9 through 12.

In the late 1960s, Brenau began offering evening and weekend classes to both men and women apart from Women's College classes.

Brenau College became Brenau University in 1992 by a vote of the board of trustees, a name change that reflected the comprehensive programs of study, the diverse student body, new and stricter employment criteria for professors, and the scope of available graduate programs.

Brenau offered its first online programs in 2002 to meet needs of students who, because of professional or personal responsibilities, were unable to attend classes on campus.

The institution is led by president David Barnett, who was appointed to the position in February 2024 after the death of president Anne Skleder the previous fall. Brenau is accredited by the Southern Association of Colleges and Schools and several subject-specific accrediting organizations. The Clinical Counseling Psychology master's degree program is accredited by the Master's in Psychology and Counseling Accreditation Council (MPCAC).

=== The Women's College ===
The Women's College of Brenau University continues the tradition of education for women, serving both residential and commuter students. The mission of the university is reflected in the strong emphasis on the broad-based liberal arts education supporting its 50-plus areas of study. The college includes an interdisciplinary Women's Leadership Certificate Program designed to offer students academic and experiential opportunities to develop leadership skills informed by gender awareness. In addition to taking foundational courses in gender studies and leadership principles, students complete an internship related to women in leadership.

=== Sidney O. Smith Jr. Graduate School ===
At the beginning of the 21st century, following the first decade of operations as a master's level university, graduate programs at Brenau represented a small percentage of the student body. By 2010 it was clear the demand for graduate studies would increase and, by 2025, graduate students at Brenau would represent more than half the student population. Thus, the university created the Sidney O. Smith Jr. Graduate School to place focused attention on the needs of graduate students. Graduate studies at the university include programs based on campus, online programs, and a mix of online and on-campus classes. In November 2010 the institution's accreditor, the Southern Association of Colleges and Schools Commission on Colleges, approved Brenau University's application to become a Level V doctoral degree-granting institution, paving the way for Brenau to launch a Doctor of Nursing Practice program in August 2011. A year earlier Brenau launched its first terminal degree program, a Master of Fine Arts in Interior Design. The first cohort of the Doctor of Occupational Therapy program started in 2014 and a Doctor of Physical Therapy Program began in 2015. The graduate school also offers a wide array of master's-level programs as well as education specialist graduate degrees.

=== Brenau Academy ===
Brenau Academy was formed in 1928 when Pearce told his wife that some of the first-year college students were having trouble with their course work. She began a program to help prepare young women for college which evolved quickly into the Brenau Academy, which until 2012 remained the only female, college preparatory, residential school for grades 9–12 in the state of Georgia. The academy evolved in 2011 into an early college program of the women's college in which qualified young women could earn college credits during the time of their lives in which they normally would complete high school studies. Today, the historic academy space is utilized by the women's college.

=== Legal issues ===
In the late 2000s, two current or former employees were convicted of sexual assaults in separate cases.

== Academics ==
Brenau comprises four colleges: The Ivester College of Health Sciences, the College of Fine Arts & Humanities, the College of Business & Communication, and the College of Education. The Ivester College of Health Sciences is also home to the Mary Inez Grindle School of Nursing and the School of Occupational Therapy.

Brenau offers doctoral, master's, specialist, bachelor's and associate degrees, as well as professional certifications, in more than 50 areas of study. Terminal degrees include a Master of Fine Arts in Interior Design, a Doctor of Nursing Practice, a Doctor of Occupational Therapy and a Doctor of Physical Therapy.

=== Online programs ===
Since 2002, students have been able to earn degrees from Brenau University online. The initial mission of the online studies program was to serve students who may be working, traveling, disabled, geographically isolated from institutions of higher education, or homebound while caring for children or other family members. However, associate, baccalaureate, master's, and certification programs are now available in this format. Some degree programs, such as the Master of Applied Gerontology, are offered entirely online.

=== 2+2 partnership with Anhui Normal University ===
Brenau University operated a partnership from 2016 until 2021 with Anhui Normal University in a "2+2" program between the universities that allowed students who have completed the first two years of their degree program at Anhui Normal University to complete the final two years of their undergraduate educations at Brenau. The first cohort of 18 students from ANU arrived at Brenau in 2016 as juniors in the early childhood teacher education program and graduated in 2018 with degrees from both institutions.

== Student life ==
The Women's College continues as the heart of the university with more than 800 students each year from nearly all 50 states and more than a dozen foreign countries. In 2018, Brenau was ranked No. 6 in the South and No. 1 in Georgia by U.S. News & World Report for Best Campus Ethnic Diversity.

=== Greek life ===
Brenau University has one of the oldest Greek systems in the United States. Brenau is one of only four women's colleges in the United States that has Greek life, and with eight sororities active on campus, Brenau has the most chapters. The other women's colleges with Greek systems are Stephens College in Columbia, Missouri; Spelman College in Atlanta; and Bennett College in Greensboro, North Carolina.

Of the eight chapters active at Brenau, two are NPHC (National Pan-Hellenic Council) and six are NPC (National Panhellenic Conference) sororities. For the six NPC chapters "formal recruitment" follows Panhellenic's recruitment guidelines and occurs annually at the beginning of the academic year, while the NPHC or historically African American Greek organizations hold their recruitment separate from the formal process. These sororities follow NPHC recruitment guidelines, with membership intake for Alpha Kappa Alpha and Delta Sigma Theta at the discretion of the individual organization.

Every woman at Brenau who is a member of a sorority becomes a member of the campus' Greek Council, the governing body over all sororities on campus, both NPC and NPHC. The Greek Council sponsors social and other events throughout the year including the Greek Sing, Greek Week, and the Greek Gala.

The sorority chapters active on campus and their founding dates are:

- Alpha Delta Pi April 18, 1910
- Invitation from the Phi Mu chapter at Brenau College, Gainesville, Georgia, 1955
  Phi Mu October 8, 1910
- Zeta Tau Alpha January 15, 1911
- Alpha Chi Omega November 24, 1911
- Alpha Gamma Delta May 5, 1913
- Delta Delta Delta May 6, 1914
- Alpha Kappa Alpha (Rho Eta Chapter) May 14, 1994
- Delta Sigma Theta April 21, 2000

== Athletics ==
The Brenau athletic teams are called the Golden Tigers. The university is a member of the National Association of Intercollegiate Athletics (NAIA), primarily competing in the Appalachian Athletic Conference (AAC) since the 2017–18 academic year. The Golden Tigers previously competed in the Southern States Athletic Conference (SSAC; formerly known as Georgia–Alabama–Carolina Conference (GACC) until after 2003–04) from 1999–2000 to 2016–17.

Brenau competes in 13 intercollegiate varsity sports: basketball, cheerleading, cross country, competitive dance, golf, lacrosse, soccer, softball, spirit cheerleading, swimming & diving, tennis, track & field and volleyball.

=== History ===
Early in the college's history, athletics were neglected in favor of academic programs and fine arts. A new emphasis on developing Brenau's athletics department came in 2002 when Mike Lochstampfor became head coach of the soccer team. Lochstampfor came to Brenau after serving as the director of the Men's and Women's Soccer programs at Oglethorpe University in Atlanta. Beginning with Lochstampfor's tenure, and credited to the support of Brenau President Ed Schrader, the university's athletic program would more than triple over the next 15 years. A boost to campus athletics came in 2004, when Brenau's softball team played its inaugural season. The 2005–2006 academic year saw new basketball and volleyball teams hit the courts. In 2009, Lochstampfor was named Brenau University's Athletic Director, overseeing all athletic teams while remaining head coach of the soccer team. In 2013, Brenau formed a track & field program and a golf program. Finally, the university' latest team began play in the 2017–2018 school year with a new lacrosse program. This brought the total number of teams at Brenau, including junior varsity teams and a spirit cheerleading squad, to 15.

In 2017, the Golden Tigers softball team played its inaugural season at Ernest Ledford Grindle Athletics Park, the first of its kind for the university. The team had a record-setting year as SSAC conference champions, with head coach Devon Thomas named the 2017 SSAC Coach of the Year for leading his squad in his 15th season to an unprecedented 30–0 record, including conference tournament play, and a No. 2 national ranking. The Tigers went 48–5 overall in the regular season. Thomas and assistant coaches Gary Hatfield and Mike Ledford were also selected as the 2017 East Region Softball staff of the year and were among six staff finalists for the national coaching staff of the year.

Brenau teams have regularly been named NAIA Scholar Teams, or those teams with a minimum GPA of 3.0. In 2018, five Brenau teams finished nationally ranked: cheer, No. 6; swimming & diving, No. 7; tennis, No. 14; softball, No. 19; and golf, No. 24.

== Location ==
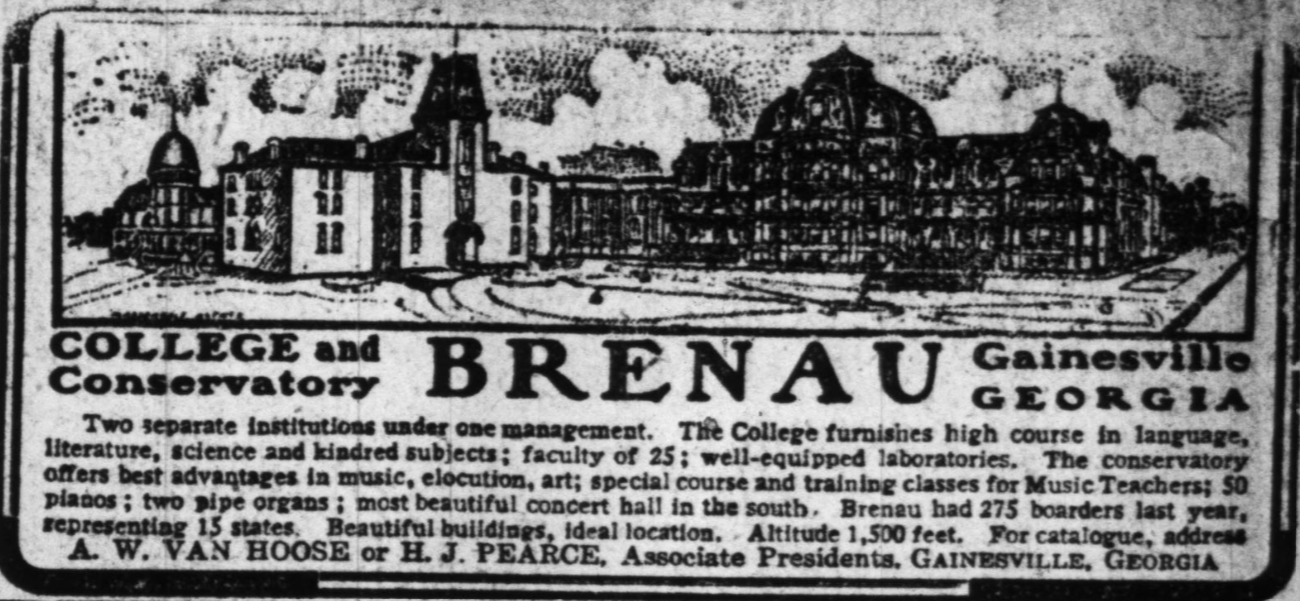
1906 advertisement for Brenau College in The Atlanta Constitution

Brenau's 57-acre main campus is located in Gainesville, Georgia, approximately 50 miles northeast of Atlanta, in the foothills of the Blue Ridge Mountains. Brenau University maintains day, evening, weekend and online programs at the main campus in Gainesville, and in Norcross, Georgia.

== Galleries and collections ==
Until 1985, when John S. Burd became president of the university, Brenau lacked a designated art gallery; student and faculty work was displayed in various buildings across the campus. Recognizing the need for a gallery, Burd converted a small chapel outside the balcony of the university's Pearce Auditorium into the "President's Gallery". Director of visual arts Mary Jane Taylor became the first gallery director and began expanding the frequency and breadth of art exhibitions on campus throughout the late 1980s. Burd also initiated the creation of Brenau's permanent art collection in 1986. The first important acquisition during this period was a still life painted by the American artist William Merritt Chase. The collection today consists of over 1,100 pieces and is periodically exhibited on campus.

Highlights include early oil paintings by Pierre-Auguste Renoir and Paul Cézanne; watercolors by Eugène Delacroix; artifacts from the pre-Columbian period of American history; an oil painting by Anna Elizabeth Klumpke; sculptures by Jean Arp, Maria Artemis, Clyde Connell, and William King; a gouache by Amelia Peláez; and one of the largest collections of prints anywhere by Jasper Johns.

In 1990, Brenau's neoclassical library building, originally built in 1914, was redesigned to house the Simmons Visual Arts Center. The second art gallery director, Jean Westmacott, was appointed by the university that year and Brenau held its inaugural art exhibition, featuring Jasper Johns's prints from the Leo Castelli Collection, at the Simmons Visual Arts Center in March 1991. This exhibition also launched an outreach program focusing on art education. Gallery tours and hands-on workshops for children have become a regular feature of this educational curriculum. Since the opening of the Simmons Center, the university has hosted a wide range of art exhibits, including the work of Brenau's faculty and students as well as the work of nationally and internationally acclaimed artists. The works of Benny Andrews, Beverly Buchanan, Lamar Dodd, Nancy Graves, William King, Roy Lichtenstein, Marisol, Robert Rauschenberg, James Rosenquist, Donald Saff, Frank Stella, and Neil Welliver have appeared in the university's galleries. The Brenau galleries have also featured such group exhibitions as the women artists from the Vogel Collection.

In March 2002, the Burd Performing Arts Center opened and gave the university a new home for visual art on campus. The center's gallery is known as the Leo Castelli Gallery, in honor of the New York art dealer and university trustee responsible for several major art acquisitions and exhibitions by the Brenau University Galleries. The gallery's primary function is to house long-term exhibitions of art from the permanent collection of the university.

In 2010, Brenau University entered a partnership with the Atlanta High Museum of Art. The collaboration will help deepen Brenau's commitment to the arts as part of its curriculum, and will allow Brenau students to have access to lectures, exhibits, and other special programs at the High.

The Trustee Library on Brenau's Gainesville campus houses the first exhibit of artifacts and personal possessions of the late Dian Fossey, the famed authors of Gorillas in the Mist, through a partnership with the Dian Fossey Gorilla Fund International.

Brenau University houses the Eleanor Dare Stones, the curious and controversial collection that purports to shed light on the mystery of the Lost Colony of Roanoke.

In 2014 a fourth gallery space was introduced on Brenau's campus. The Manhattan Gallery, located in the Brenau University Downtown Center, features an ongoing exhibition of Brenau University Permanent Art Collection works. The installation features work by artists who have some connection to the New York art world that has generously supported Brenau University over the years. The space is anchored by over 100 works from the collection of Dorothy and Herbert Vogel, who were very well known in the New York art scene. The exhibition also features a number of photographs and prints by artist Andy Warhol, which were given to Brenau by the Andy Warhol Foundation. Other notable artists represented include Kiki Smith, Hunt Slonem, Margaret Evangeline and Dennis Campay. Many of the artists in the Manhattan Gallery played major roles in the movements that made New York City the cultural destination that it is today. This installation highlights the extraordinary breadth and caliber of the Brenau University Permanent Art Collection.

== Pearce Auditorium ==
In late 1895, a meeting of the Gainesville townspeople discussed the need for a new auditorium. A.W. Van Hoose and Haywood Jefferson Pearce, president of Brenau University from 1893 to 1943, asked the community to lend Brenau US$10,000 without interest for five years for the construction of an auditorium. The funds were raised in a short period, and the contract for the construction was signed April 1, 1896.

The auditorium was completed within only a year and dedicated on May 21, 1897, as "the largest of its kind in the South." Nearly 67 years later on March 26, the auditorium was dedicated in honor of Pearce.

In 1978, the building was named to the National Register of Historic Places, along with others on the Brenau campus. Three years later, it was closed for renovations, reopening in the spring of 1984. "It's difficult to imagine Brenau University without Pearce Auditorium. In fact, it is hard to imagine Gainesville without Pearce Auditorium," said John W. Jacobs Jr., chairman of the Brenau board of trustees, as he began the centennial observance of the dedication of Pearce Auditorium.

In addition to its wide usage by such local groups as The Arts Council, the Gainesville Theatre Alliance, the Gainesville Ballet, the Gainesville Symphony Orchestra and others, Pearce Auditorium has been the site of many famous speakers. Helen Keller, Will Durant, Ted Shawn, Ruth St. Dennis, Martin Luther King Sr., Letitia Baldrige, Roberta Peters, Williams Warwick, Dan Rather, Jane Fonda and Maria von Trapp, Sally Ride, Dennis Weaver, Mary Matalin and James Carville, Rory Kennedy, and Khaled Hosseini all have spoken or performed in Pearce. The Arts Council has welcomed additional guests in recent years as part of its Pearce Series, including the Atlanta Symphony Orchestra, the New York City Opera, the Joffery II Ballet, the Vienna Boys Choir, Ramsey Lewis, Dave Brubeck, Herbie Mann, Chuck Mangione, Steve Allen, and Loretta Switt.

== Northeast Georgia History Center ==
During the 1970s, James and Francis Mathis started collecting artifacts from the early days of those who settled in Northeast Georgia. A number of items were soon displayed at Gainesville's Home Federal Savings Bank. As others in the community started to express an interest in remembering the past, a nucleus began to be formed with plans to start a museum.

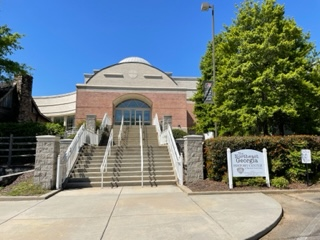
Northeast Georgia History Center, Brenau University, Gainesville, GA

The City of Gainesville made available to the group a vacant fire station building downtown. Volunteers then began collecting objects that would relate to the history of this area. The Georgia Mountain History Museum was underway. School children, tourists, and home-folks were soon attracted to the museum.

By the early 1990s, it was realized that the future of the museum had to include its own building in a more accessible location. The turning point came in 1995 when Brenau University President John Burd committed a tract of campus property for the History Museum, the White Path Cabin, and a blacksmith shop donated by Hoyt Herrin. Volunteers started soliciting the community for contributions and, after some years of stop and go, architectural plans were finally completed and all stood in readiness for its grand opening, held in May 2004.

Today, the Northeast Georgia History Center at Brenau University is a not-for-profit institution dedicated to promoting and displaying historical artifacts and displays from the northeast Georgia area from the past 150 years with on-site education programming for school groups, families and adults.

== Center for Lifetime Study/Brenau University Learning and Leisure Institute (BULLI) ==
The Brenau University Learning and Leisure Institute offers non-credit classes for mature adults looking to stimulate their thinking and expand their knowledge. A variation on common Elderhostel programs, BULLI is made available to and oriented towards adults in the Northeast Georgia community who are seeking academically oriented continuing education.

In April 2012 BULLI expanded to a Braselton satellite campus in cooperation with that Georgia city's government.

== Notable people ==
=== University alumnae ===
- Wenonah Bell, painter
- Nellie Weldon Cocroft, ragtime composer
- Clyde Connell, abstract impressionist artist
- Florence Reville Gibbs, former member of Congress
- Allie Carroll Hart, director of the Georgia Department of Archives and History
- Ellnora Krannert, philanthropist and patron of the arts
- Helen Dortch Longstreet, the widow of a Confederate general who became a leading political figure and environmentalist.
- Annabel Matthews, member of the United States Board of Tax Appeals
- Dulcé Sloan, comedian and correspondent on The Daily Show with Trevor Noah
- Lera Millard Thomas, former member of Congress
- Presley Merritt Wagoner, 40th President General of the Daughters of the American Revolution

=== Academy alumnae ===
- Amanda Blake, Actress, Class of 1945
- Katherine Jane Bryant, Emmy award-winning costume designer for Mad Men, Class of 1985

=== Faculty and administration ===
- Mortimer Wilson, composer and former music professor
- Franciszek Zachara, pianist and former Dean of Music
- Giuseppe Ferrata, composer and music director (1899-1902)
