= Víctor Miguel Pacheco Méndez =

Dominican businessman and entrepreneur (born 1982)

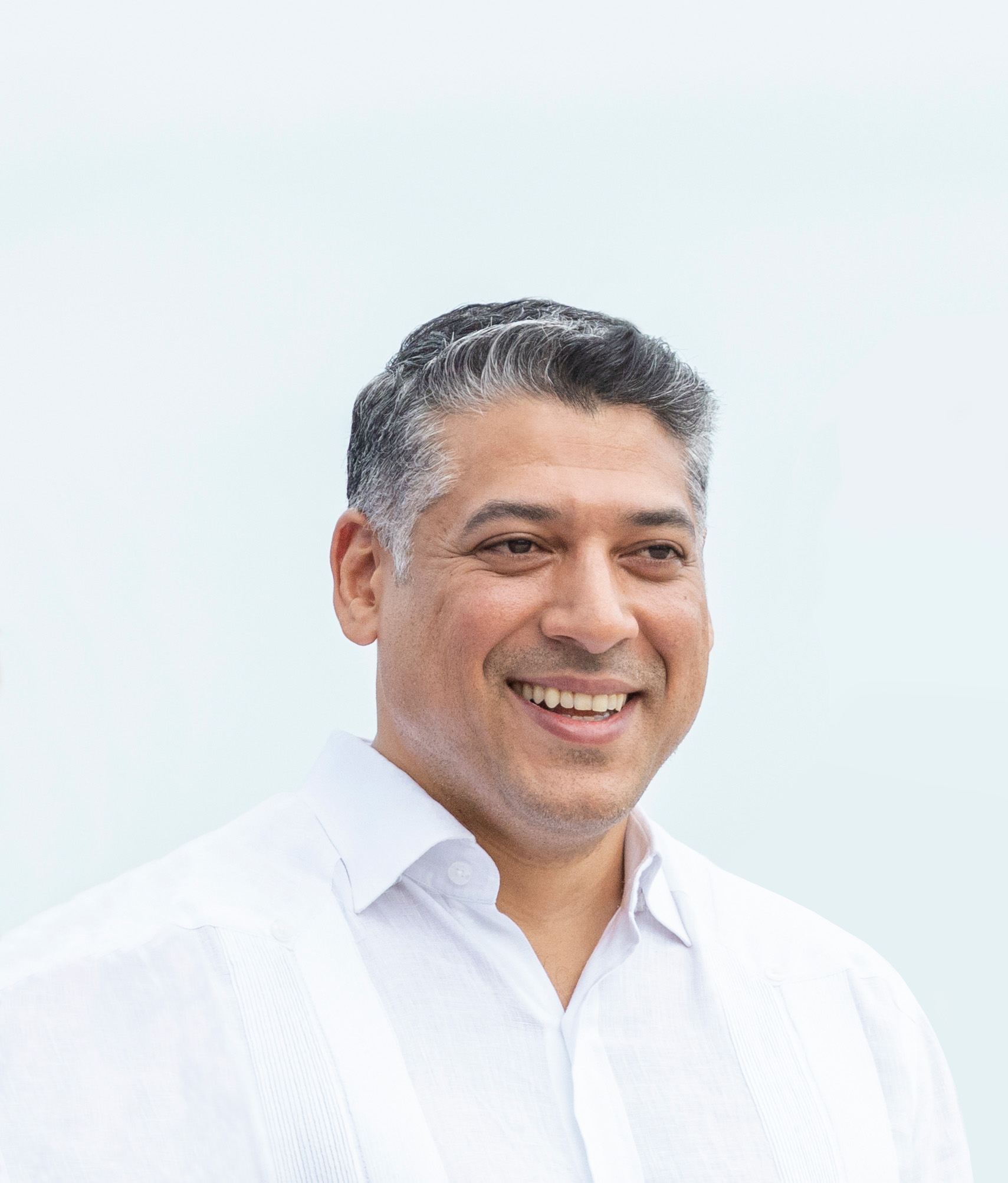
Pacheco Méndez in 2022

Víctor Miguel Pacheco Méndez (born June 9, 1982) is a Dominican businessman and entrepreneur. He is the founder of airlines Arajet and Laytrip. With the idea of transforming commercial flying in the Dominican Republic, both companies are designed to support tourism to and from the Dominican Republic.

== Early life and education ==
From a very young age he was interested in the world of finance and entrepreneurship which he was introduced to by his grandfather Víctor Méndez Capellán. Pacheco completed elementary school at Carol Morgan School and later continued his secondary studies at Riverside Military Academy, Georgia. Most recently, he graduated from Universidad Iberoamericana with a bachelor's degree in Business Administration.

== Career ==
He started his career in finance and administration.

In August 2015, Pacheco received certifications for the initiation of flying operations from the Instituto Dominicano de Aviación Civil (IDAC) and the Junta de Aviación Civil (JAC). By June 28, 2017, Pacheco held the position of Chief Executive Officer of Arajet, the first low-cost carrier in the Dominican Republic.

In November 2021, he became chairman of Laytrip, Inc., a worldwide layaway travel provider, where users can search thousands of real-time flight and hotel listings and book any combination of travel itineraries.

During the launch ceremony of the Arajet airline on March 14, 2022, Victor Pacheco announced his alliance as a strategic partner with Bain Capital, one of the world’s leading private multi-asset alternative investment firms and Griffin Global Asset Management, a commercial aircraft leasing and alternative asset management company, to support Arajet growth plans and mission.
