= Dare Stones =

Series of stone inscriptions attributed to the Lost Colonists of Roanoke

An artistic depiction of the first Dare Stone

The Dare Stones are a series of stones inscribed with messages supposedly written by members of the lost Roanoke Colony, allegedly discovered in various places across the Southeastern United States in the late 1930s. The colonists were last seen on Roanoke Island, off the coast of what is now North Carolina, in August 1587, and the mystery of their disappearance has since become a part of American folklore. The stones created a media circus in the United States, as the public became fascinated with the possible resolution of the Lost Colony's fate.

A total of 48 Dare Stones are catalogued at Brenau University in Gainesville, Georgia, although additional stones were also reported. Nearly all of the inscriptions in the Brenau collection purport to be messages from Lost Colonist Eleanor Dare to her father, the colony's governor John White, who had left for England in 1587 and returned three years later to discover all of the colonists missing. Taken together, the messages compose a narrative describing the fate of the missing colonists between 1591 and 1603, in which they are said to have migrated from Roanoke to the Chattahoochee River Valley near present-day Atlanta, Georgia, in September 1587.

The first stone was reported in 1937 by Louis E. Hammond, who claimed to have found it near the Chowan River. The inscription referred to another stone marking a mass grave, prompting an intense search. The other 47 stones at Brenau, presented in response to a reward offer, were of a markedly different style; all of these were eventually connected to Georgia stonecutter Bill Eberhardt and discredited. By 1941 scholars and the press had dismissed all of the Dare Stones as hoaxes, although the authenticity of Hammond's stone has not been conclusively proven or disproven.

== Background ==
The settlement now known as "The Lost Colony" was England's second attempt to colonize the Virginia territory in North America, following the failure of Ralph Lane's 1585 Roanoke settlement. The colonists arrived at Roanoke in July 1587, with John White as the appointed governor. Their intended destination was the Chesapeake Bay, but the crew of the expedition refused to take them farther than Roanoke. Hostilities between Lane's colony and the mainland Secotan tribe made Roanoke a dangerous choice for a new colony, although White's group was able to renew friendly relations with the Croatan on nearby Croatoan Island.

According to White, the settlers had already discussed plans to relocate "50 miles further up into the maine", referring to Albemarle Sound, which would place the new location near the mouth of the Chowan River. When the fleet prepared to leave in August, the colonists persuaded White to accompany it back to England, to arrange a resupply mission in 1588. They expected White to return the following year, but the Anglo–Spanish War delayed his return until 1590, by which time he found the Roanoke settlement dismantled, abandoned, and surrounded by fortifications. White discovered the word "CROATOAN" carved into a post of the village palisade, but was unable to follow this lead, as poor weather forced a search of the island to be hastily abandoned. Subsequent investigations into the area were limited, and frustrated by storms and the dangerous waters of the Outer Banks.

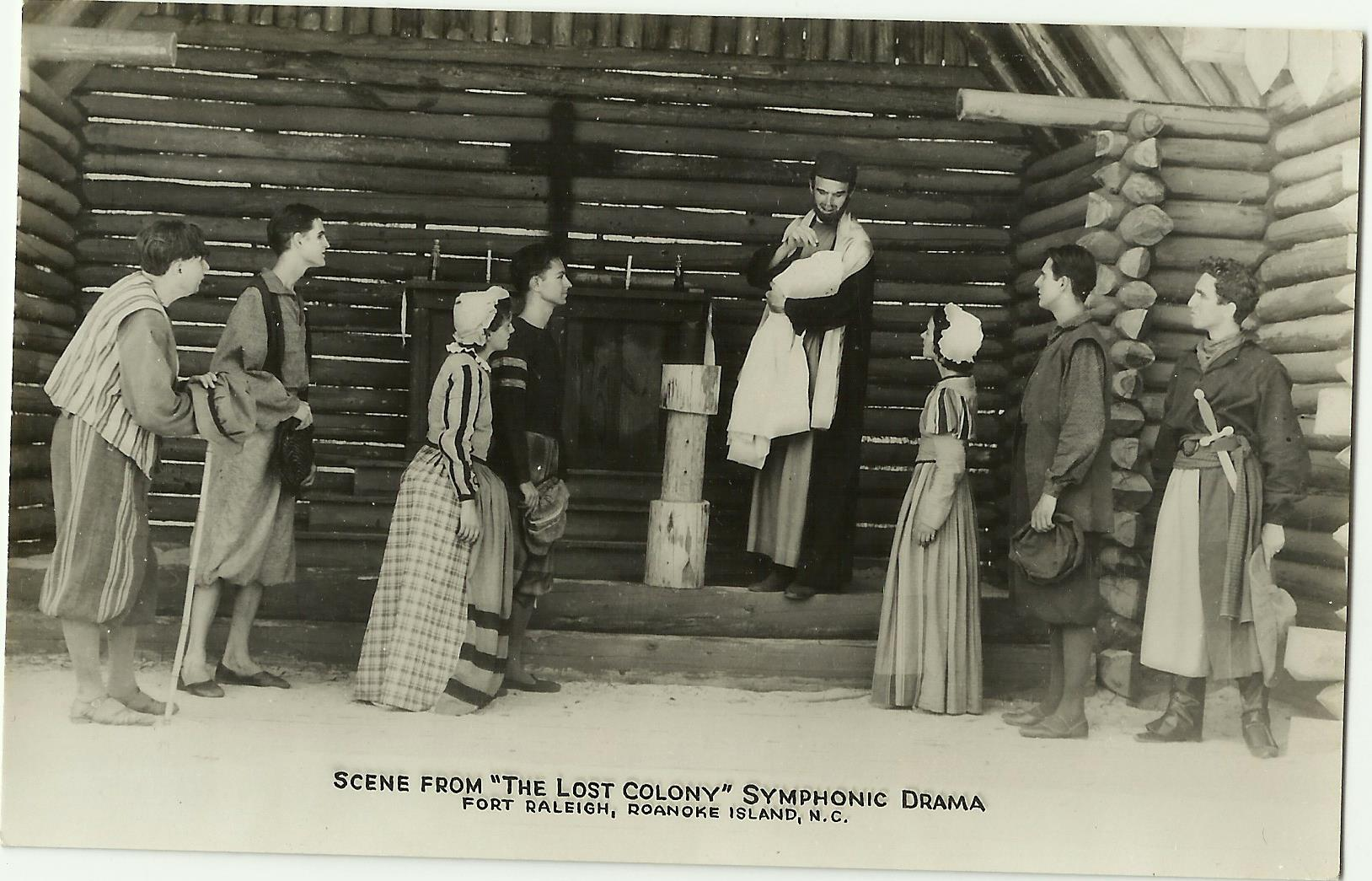
Baptism scene, from the play The Lost Colony

In 1612, William Strachey wrote that the Lost Colonists and the Chesepians were slaughtered by the Powhatan tribe shortly before the founding of Jamestown in 1607. According to this account, the Powhatan leader Wahunsenacawh was warned by his priests about a nation that would one day arise from the Chesapeake Bay to threaten his tribe, and therefore the massacre was carried out to avert the prophecy. Strachey reported that seven surviving colonists – four men, two boys, and a young woman – fled up the Chowan River, where they were captured by another tribe and kept in a place called "Ritanoe" to beat copper. Strachey's theory was widely accepted in the mid-to-late 20th century, although historians have since questioned the objectivity of his sources and his agenda against Wahunsenacawh. In any event, the details of Strachey's account would not have been easily familiar to most Americans in the 1930s.

The story of the Lost Colony became popular in the United States following several dramatic accounts published in the 1830s. Eleanor Dare's daughter, Virginia Dare, who was the first child born in an English colony in the New World, became an iconic figure, and celebrations of her birthday became a major North Carolina tourist attraction. In 1937, a Paul Green play, The Lost Colony, debuted on Roanoke Island. President Franklin D. Roosevelt attended a performance on Virginia Dare's 350th birthday.

== The Chowan River Dare Stone ==
On November 8, 1937, Louis E. Hammond visited Emory University in Atlanta, Georgia, with a 21-pound (9.5 kg) stone, asking for help to interpret the markings on it. Hammond claimed to be a California tourist traveling the country with his wife. He said he found the stone in August 1937 by the east bank of the Chowan River, in Chowan County, North Carolina.

On one side the stone reads:

ANANIAS DARE &
VIRGINIA WENT HENCE
VNTO HEAVEN 1591

ANYE ENGLISHMAN SHEW
JOHN WHITE GOVR VIA

Translation:

Ananias Dare &
Virginia went hence
unto Heaven, 1591

Any Englishman show [this rock to]
John White, Governor of Virginia

The other side elaborates:

FATHER SOONE AFTER YOV
GOE FOR ENGLANDE WEE CAM
HITHER ONLIE MISARIE & WARRE
TOW YEERE ABOVE HALFE DEADE ERE TOW
YEERE MORE FROM SICKNES BEINE FOVRE & TWENTIE
SALVAGE WITH MESSAGE OF SHIPP VNTO US SMAL
SPACE OF TIME THEY AFFRITE OF REVENGE RANN
AL AWAYE WEE BLEEVE YT NOTT YOV SOONE AFTER
YE SALVAGES FAINE SPIRTS ANGRIE SVDDIANE
MVRTHER AL SAVE SEAVEN MINE CHILDE
ANANIAS TO SLAINE WTH MVCH MISARIE
BVRIE AL NEERE FOVRE MYLES EASTE THIS RIVER
VPPON SMAL HILL NAMES WRIT AL THER
ON ROCKE PVTT THIS THEIR ALSOE SALVAGE
SHEW THIS VNTO YOV & HITHER WEE
PROMISE YOV TO GIVE GREATE
PLENTIE PRESENTS
EWD

Translation:

Father, soon after you
go for England, we came
here. Only misery and war [for]
two years. Above half dead these two
years, more from sickness, being twenty-four.
[A] Savage with [a] message of [a] ship came to us. [Within a] small
space of time, they [became] frightened of revenge [and] ran
all away. We believe it [was] not you. Soon after,
the savages said spirits [were] angry. Suddenly
[they] murdered all save seven. My child [and]
Ananias, too, [were] slain with much misery.
Buried all near four miles east [of] this river,
upon [a] small hill. Names [were] written all there
on [a] rock. Put this there also. [If a] Savage
shows this to you, we
promised you [would] give [them] great
plenty presents.
EWD.

The inscription was interpreted as a message from Eleanor White Dare ("EWD") providing an update on the state of the Lost Colonists to her father, John White.

A group of Emory professors, including Haywood Pearce Jr., traveled with Hammond to the site where he claimed to have discovered the stone. They could not determine the precise location of the find, but the trip convinced the professors that Hammond was a reliable source. Emory announced the find on November 14, 1937.

Pearce published his findings in the May 1938 issue of The Journal of Southern History. "The authenticity of this stone", he wrote, "can never be fully and finally established without further corroborative evidence". Nevertheless, he argued that the content of the stone was consistent with Strachey's account of seven survivors of a supernaturally-motivated massacre, who escaped up the Chowan River. He also explained that the spelling conformed to expectations of Elizabethan orthography, and that the necessary tools for such an inscription were likely to have been in the possession of the colonists.

== Further stones discovered ==
Because Hammond's stone alluded to a rock marking a burial site, rumors swirled about Virginia Dare's tombstone. Pearce felt that locating this second stone would solidify the legitimacy of the first, and create a legacy for the person who found it. When Emory declined to purchase the Chowan River stone from Hammond in 1938, Pearce made his own offer with backing from Brenau, which was owned by his father, Haywood Pearce Sr. Pearce, his father, and his stepmother Lucille all made several trips to Edenton, North Carolina, to conduct surveys and excavations in 1938 and 1939. To raise awareness in the local community, they spoke before community organizations, and offered a reward of $500 (equivalent to about $11,600 in 2025) to anyone that could produce the second stone.

At least two North Carolina men – T. E. Chappell of Tyner, and Tom Shallington of Tyrell County – came forward purporting to have found the stone the Pearces were looking for. However, there is no record of the Pearces examining either claim, and the stones were never added to the Brenau collection.

=== Bush River stones ===
In May 1939, Bill Eberhardt made several visits to Brenau to deliver stones he claimed to have found at a hill near Greenville County, South Carolina, near the town of Pelzer. Initially, his finds were dismissed until the Pearces showed him Hammond's stone, and explained what writing they expected to find on the stone they were seeking. Shortly thereafter, Eberhardt produced a stone that fit their description. The Pearces quickly set out to purchase the hill, although Eberhardt claimed to have already removed every stone with writing from the site.

Eberhardt, a Fulton County, Georgia backwoodsman, claimed to be a stonecutter by trade, and he was later found to have a history of selling counterfeit Native American relics. Nevertheless, as he had only a third-grade education, the Pearces evidently believed he was not intelligent enough to perpetrate a hoax. As a test, they offered him a choice between the original $500 reward or $100 in cash plus a 50% stake in whatever was excavated from the hill. Eberhardt chose the latter, which reassured the Pearces that he genuinely believed his finds indicated some great archaeological value in the site. (Later, Eberhardt secretly sold his interest in the hill, at the height of the publicity surrounding his stones.)

The thirteen stones Eberhardt purportedly found in Greenville County were added to Brenau's collection, becoming Dare Stones Numbers 2–14. (Hammond's Chowan River stone became Dare Stone Number 1.) The inscriptions on the new stones were noticeably very different from that of Hammond's, with large, mixed-case letters in a loose, rounded style. They also indicated that the 1591 massacre described by the Chowan River stone had occurred in South Carolina, approximately 400 miles (640 km) from the Chowan River. Pearce Jr., attempted to rationalize this by suggesting that Stone Number 1 was inscribed in Greenville County and then carried to Chowan County by a Native American courier.

=== Hall County, Georgia stone ===
Dare Stone Number 2 contains the text "Father wee goe sw". The Pearces reasoned that a southwestern course would lead the colonists along the Chattahoochee River into present-day Georgia, and asked Eberhart to look for more stones there.

This strategy was seemingly confirmed when Dare Stone Number 15 was reported in July 1939 by Isaac Turner of Atlanta. Turner claimed to have found his stone in Hall County, Georgia back in March, prior to the Pearces' dealings with Eberhardt. The Turner stone resembled Eberhardt's finds, and claimed the Lost Colonists "pvtt moche clew bye waye" for John White to find.

=== Habersham County, Georgia stones ===
In August 1939, Eberhardt returned to Brenau with nine more stones (numbered 16–24) allegedly found in Habersham County, Georgia. The narrative in these stones describes Eleanor and the other colonists traveling toward "great Hontoaoase lodgement" and living in "primaeval splendour" between 1591 and 1593.

=== Fulton town, Georgia stones ===
When Eberhardt delivered three new stones to Brenau in August 1940, he offered to lead the Pearces to where he had discovered them. The site was in Fulton County, Georgia, four miles from Eberhardt's home. When they arrived, Eberhardt handed over four additional stones, willfully disregarding instructions to leave them where he found them. These seven stones were catalogued as Dare Stone Numbers 25–31. Of particular note, Stone 26 establishes that Eleanor became the wife of a Native American chieftain in 1593, while Stone 28 mentions requests in 1598 that John White remove her daughter to England. Stone 25 represents Eleanor Dare's tombstone, placing her death in the year 1599.

Eberhardt also showed the Pearces an inscription similar to that of the Dare Stones on a ledge inside a cave near the Chattahoochee River. This find was not assigned a number until the ledge was chipped off and taken by a teenager. After negotiating for the surrender of the fragments, the Pearces identified them as Dare Stone Number 47. The message simply establishes that Eleanor had been living near the cave since 1593. This and Stone 25 indicated a six-year period in a single location, making it reasonable to expect Eberhardt to find more stones nearby.

During the course of September 1940, Eberhardt brought another thirteen stones (Numbers 32–35 and 37–45), again defying instructions to leave them in situ and again claiming they were discovered near his home. Stone Number 37, found near Jett Mill outside Roswell, Georgia, was presented as a joint discovery by Eberhardt and Turner (who had reported Stone 15). Stone Number 36 was given to the Pearces by William Bruce of Atlanta. He claimed to have found it near the Powers Ferry Bridge over Nancy Creek, not far from his home. Five of the stones in this group (38, 39, 40, 41, and 43) represent tombstones for Lost Colonists. As the Dare Stones depicted seven surviving colonists and the deaths of six of them, Stones 44 and 45 are attributed to Griffen Jones (apparently the group's stonecutter) and Agnes Dare, the daughter of Eleanor described earlier.

Pearce Jr., believed the story behind Dare Stone Number 46 proved the legitimacy of the artifacts and the people who found them. Allegedly, Eberhardt and Turner followed up on the discovery of Stone 37 by consulting with Tom Jett, whose family had once owned Jett Mill. Jett claimed to have found a stone similar to Stone 37, which he and his brother split in two. One half of the stone had supposedly ended up in the tool chest of Jett's father-in-law fifteen years earlier, while Jett's nephew happened to remember seeing the other and quickly found it in a ditch. The perfect fit of these two fragments was enough for Pearce to accept the hearsay of so many people.

The final stone in the Brenau collection was delivered by Eberhardt in December 1940. Dare Stone Number 48, again purportedly located near the aforementioned cave, reads "John White manye prisoner fourtie mylles nw. Griffen Jones & Agnes Dare 1603." The historical implications of this new direction in the storyline were not explored before the hoax was exposed.

== 1940 scientific conference ==
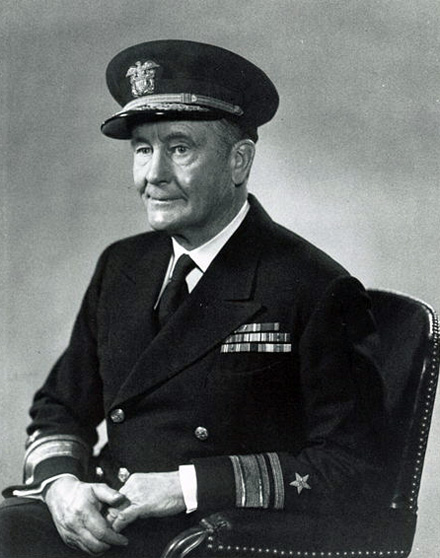
Samuel Eliot Morison described the Dare Stones as "either one of the most stupendous discoveries or stupendous hoaxes in American history".

The Pearces intended to host a scientific conference at Brenau in September 1939, which would allow scholars to examine the Dare Stones and weigh in on their authenticity. Days before the conference was to begin, however, the Pearces postponed until the following autumn. The delay was explained by the need for more time to review new evidence, presumably referring to the stones that suggested the Lost Colonists reached present-day Georgia.

The conference was held on October 19–20, 1940. Thirty-four experts attended, including archaeologists, historians, geologists, ethnologists, and linguists. The participation of Samuel Eliot Morison, chair of the Department of American History at Harvard University, lent considerable credibility to the proceedings. The guests reviewed the stones themselves and the circumstances of their discovery. Tom Jett appeared at the conference to attest that he had observed Dare Stone Number 46 in his childhood.

The attendees appointed a five-person committee, headed by Morison, to issue a preliminary report for the press. This statement supported the authenticity of the Dare Stones, but cautioned that the investigation was still ongoing. Despite this equivocation, media coverage of the conference largely concluded that the Dare Stones had been verified.

Morison later distanced himself from his apparent endorsement of the stones. In 1971, he wrote that "The committee, as politely as possible, declared the stones to be fake, largely on the use of two words, 'trail' and 'reconnoitre' which were not in the English language for a century or more after 1590."

== Evidence of forgery ==
=== Saturday Evening Post exposé ===
In December 1940, Haywood Pearce Jr., submitted an article about the Dare Stones to The Saturday Evening Post. Although skeptical, the Post editors accepted the manuscript, but the fact-checking department was at a loss to handle an unverified discovery that directly contradicted the historical record. The magazine assigned veteran reporter Boyden Sparkes to investigate Pearce's story, to determine if it was worth publishing. Instead of Pearce's submission, the April 26, 1941, edition of the Post ran an article by Sparkes, challenging the authenticity of the Dare Stones.

Sparkes revealed that no one had been able to locate or learn anything about Louis E. Hammond since he left Emory; no one had met the wife he claimed to be traveling with in 1937, or the car in which he claimed to have transported the stone from Chowan County. Hammond claimed to have cleaned Dare Stone Number 1 using a wire brush, eliminating an important means of authenticating the artifact. Sparkes easily established that Bill Eberhardt, Isaac Turner, and William Bruce had known one another for years, and that Turner had been a childhood friend of Tom Jett. He noted the suspicious coincidence that Eberhardt had found most of the Dare Stones, always alone or with his associate Turner, and along a path leading towards his own home. Although Sparkes believed the stones had been faked, he did not implicate the Pearces in the forgery. However, he decried Pearce Jr., for promoting evidence favorable to the stones' legitimacy, while understating evidence to the contrary.

The 1991 book A Witness for Eleanor Dare by Robert W. White refutes the conclusions of the Sparkes piece, and attempts to argue that all 48 of Brenau's Dare Stones are authentic. White's defense of the premise that the Lost Colony migrated to the Chattahoochee Valley received limited support, and had negligible effect on the prevailing view that Eberhardt's stones are fraudulent.

=== Blackmail allegation ===
Following the Post article, Eberhardt attempted to sell Pearce Jr., another stone, but Pearce had grown suspicious. Eberhardt tried again, this time finally leading Pearce to an inscription on a bluff near the cave where Stone 47 was reported. Pearce returned to the site later with Georgia Tech geologist Count Gibson, who discovered a bottle of sulfuric acid that he surmised had been used to artificially age the writing. Pearce told Eberhardt he would no longer purchase stones from him, and neither of these inscriptions were added to the Brenau collection.

Eberhardt later arranged a meeting with Pearce's mother, Lucille, about a new artifact. When they met, he revealed a stone similar to his previous alleged discoveries, inscribed "Pearce and Dare Historical Hoaxes. We Dare Anything." According to Mrs. Pearce, Eberhardt demanded $200 from the Pearces, or he would submit the stone to The Saturday Evening Post and confess to forging all the Dare Stones he had produced. During a tense confrontation on May 13, 1941, Eberhardt kept his distance while holding a rifle, while Pearce Jr., (with Gibson as a witness) tried to manipulate him into signing a contract that would serve as a confession.

The Pearce family took their side of the story to the papers, conceding that most of the Dare Stones were hoaxes. Eberhardt denied that he attempted extortion, although he did claim to have found the "We Dare Anything" stone no differently than the others. Media coverage of the story generally dismissed all of the Dare Stones as hoaxes, without specifying which of them had been linked to Eberhardt.

== Later investigations and theories concerning the Chowan River Stone ==
Although the Dare Stones associated with Bill Eberhardt were exposed as hoaxes, the first stone could not be linked to him. Boyden Sparkes continued to investigate Louis E. Hammond, with little success, hoping to find some connection to Eberhardt or any other evidence that would discredit the original Dare Stone.

A 1983 study by South Carolina State archaeologist Robert L. Stephenson proved inconclusive. Stephenson easily dismissed three of the Eberhardt stones as forgeries, but could devise no microscopic, chemical, or physical examination that would reveal anything useful about the Hammond stone.

For a 2016 examination at the University of North Carolina, a slice of the Chowan River Stone was cut from the bottom. The test conclusively proved that the rock had not been a ballast stone from an English ship. It also revealed that the interior of the stone had a bright white color, as opposed to the weathered gray exterior. The sharp contrast would make the stone well-suited for inscribing a message, as it would take considerable time for the brightness of the lettering to fade. Using chemicals to make such an inscription appear artificially ancient would require considerable expertise, particularly in the 1930s.

Matthew Champion, an expert on medieval graffiti, concluded that the Chowan stone is consistent with the inscriptions he studies in English churches. He dismissed suggestions that the use of Roman lettering or modern Arabic numerals are anachronistic, citing contemporary examples.

Kevin Quarmby, a professor in English (Shakespeare and Early Modern Drama), examined the Chowan Stone and found the language of the inscription consistent with Elizabethan era English. Quarmby noted "subtle nuances" in the stone's message, which suggested either authenticity, or an extremely clever hoax. Quarmby, however, is by his own admission not an expert on Elizabethan paleography. In sharp contrast, Tudor historian Diarmaid MacCulloch dismissed the language on the stone as "risible forgery", emphatically stating "It has all the plausibility of Dick Van Dyke's Cockney accent in Mary Poppins."

Champion argues that the validity of the stone cannot be resolved without "a serious archaeological project", entailing an interdisciplinary research using sophisticated forms of analysis. However, scholars are reluctant to jeopardize their professional reputations on the Dare Stones, making such an undertaking difficult to organize.

A 2019 publication presented a theory that the Chowan River Stone was a forgery linked to the Plate of Brass hoax. The theory said that L.E. Hammond was not a bona fide tourist but a New Mexico academic who was in league with Haywood Pearce Jr., together with Herbert E. Bolton, the perpetrator of the Plate of Brass hoax. In a 2021 publication, this theory was discussed and dismissed.

== The stones today ==
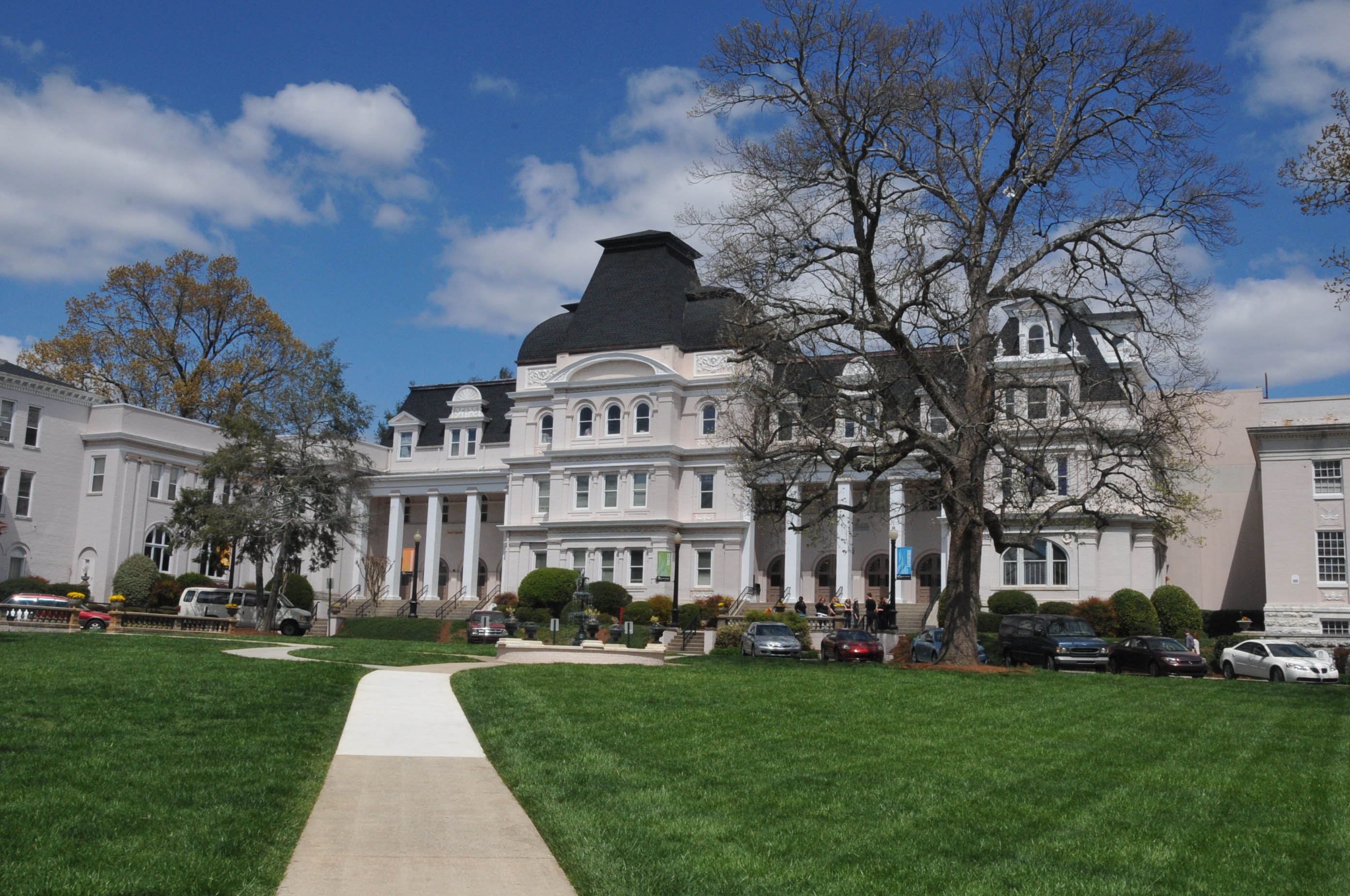
Brenau College in Gainesville, Georgia, where the stones are today. Brenau was owned by Haywood Pearce Jr's father: pictured is the Pearce Auditorium.

After the 1941 scandal, Brenau removed the 47 discredited Dare Stones from public display. The original stone was displayed in the Brenau library. Following increased attention from a 2015 TV documentary, the school's president, Ed Schrader, moved the stone to his office, citing security concerns. The rest of the stones were placed, over time, under the school's auditorium, in a boiler room beneath the amphitheater, and ultimately the attic of one of the campus houses.

Brenau has made all of the stones available for various investigations, notably cooperating with television documentaries in 1979, 2015, and 2017. The school website provides an official policy for requests to view and examine the stones, although it reserves all rights to photography and video recording of the pieces.
