= Víctor Pacheco (footballer, born 1972) =

Uruguayan footballer

Personal information
- Full name: Víctor Fabián Pacheco Techera
- Date of birth: 12 September 1972 (age 54)
- Place of birth: Montevideo, Uruguay
- Height: 1.83 m (6 ft 0 in)
- Position: Defender

Senior career*
Years	Team	Apps	(Gls)
1993–1997	Liverpool Montevideo		
1997–1998	Zacatepec		
1998–2000	Liverpool Montevideo		
2001	Deportes Puerto Montt	3	(0)
2003–2004	El Tanque Sisley		
2005	Progreso	6	(0)
2006–2007	El Tanque Sisley	39	(1)
- * Club domestic league appearances and goals

Víctor Fabián Pacheco Techera (born September 12, 1972, in Montevideo, Uruguay) is a former Uruguayan footballer who played for clubs of Uruguay, Chile and Mexico.

== Teams ==
- (Uruguay) Liverpool 1993–1997
- (Mexico) Zacatepec 1997–1998
- (Uruguay) Liverpool 1998–2000
- (Chile) Deportes Puerto Montt 2001
- (Uruguay) El Tanque Sisley 2003–2004
- (Uruguay) Progreso 2005
- (Uruguay) El Tanque Sisley 2006–2007
- (Uruguay) Salesiano de la Costa FC 2015–2018
