= H. J. Pearce =

American psychologist (1871–1943)

- Born: Haywood Jefferson Pearce; 1871
- Died: 1943 (aged 71–72)
- Occupations: Psychologist, college administrator
- Title: Dr
- Spouse: 2, including Lucile Townsend
- Children: 1 son, 2 daughters

Haywood Jefferson Pearce (1871–1943) was an American psychologist. He was the founder of Brenau College, and served as its president from 1900 to 1943.

== Early life ==
Haywood Jefferson Pearce was born in 1871. He received a PhD from a university in Germany in 1907.

== Career ==
Pearce purchased the Georgia Baptist Female Seminary in Gainesville, Georgia, in 1900 and renamed it Brenau College. He served as the president of the Southern Society for Philosophy and Psychology in 1914.

Pearce acquired the Dare Stones in 1937 and believed they were real. However, he was discredited by 1941.

== Personal life ==
Pearce was married twice. Pearce was married first to Mary E. Matthews in Muscogee County, Georgia in 1892. She died in 1898 and is buried in Linwood Cemetery in Columbus, Muscogee County, Georgia. He had a son, Haywood Jefferson Pearce Jr., from his first marriage, who became a professor of history at Emory University. In 1904, he got married a second time to Lucile Townsend, the daughter of Confederate veteran Reverend George W. Townsend of Mobile, Alabama, in 1904 in New York City. They had two daughters, Lucile and Emily.

== Death ==
Pearce died in 1943.
