= Southern Society for Philosophy and Psychology =

US academic organization

- Formation: 1904
- Website: southernsociety.org

The Southern Society for Philosophy and Psychology is an American learned society. It promotes philosophy and psychology in the Southern United States.

== History ==
The Southern Society for Philosophy and Psychology was co-founded by 36 charter members in 1904. James Mark Baldwin served as its first president from 1904 to 1908. Its second president in 1909 was J. Macbride Sterrett, followed by its third president, Albert Lefevre, in 1910. Its fourth president in 1911 was Edward Franklin Buchner, followed by its fifth president in 1912, Shepherd Ivory Franz, and its sixth president, Robert Morris Ogden, in 1913. They were followed by the seventh President, H. J. Pearce, in 1914, and the eighth President, John B. Watson, in 1915.
