= Arajet =

Flag carrier of the Dominican Republic

Arajet, S.A.

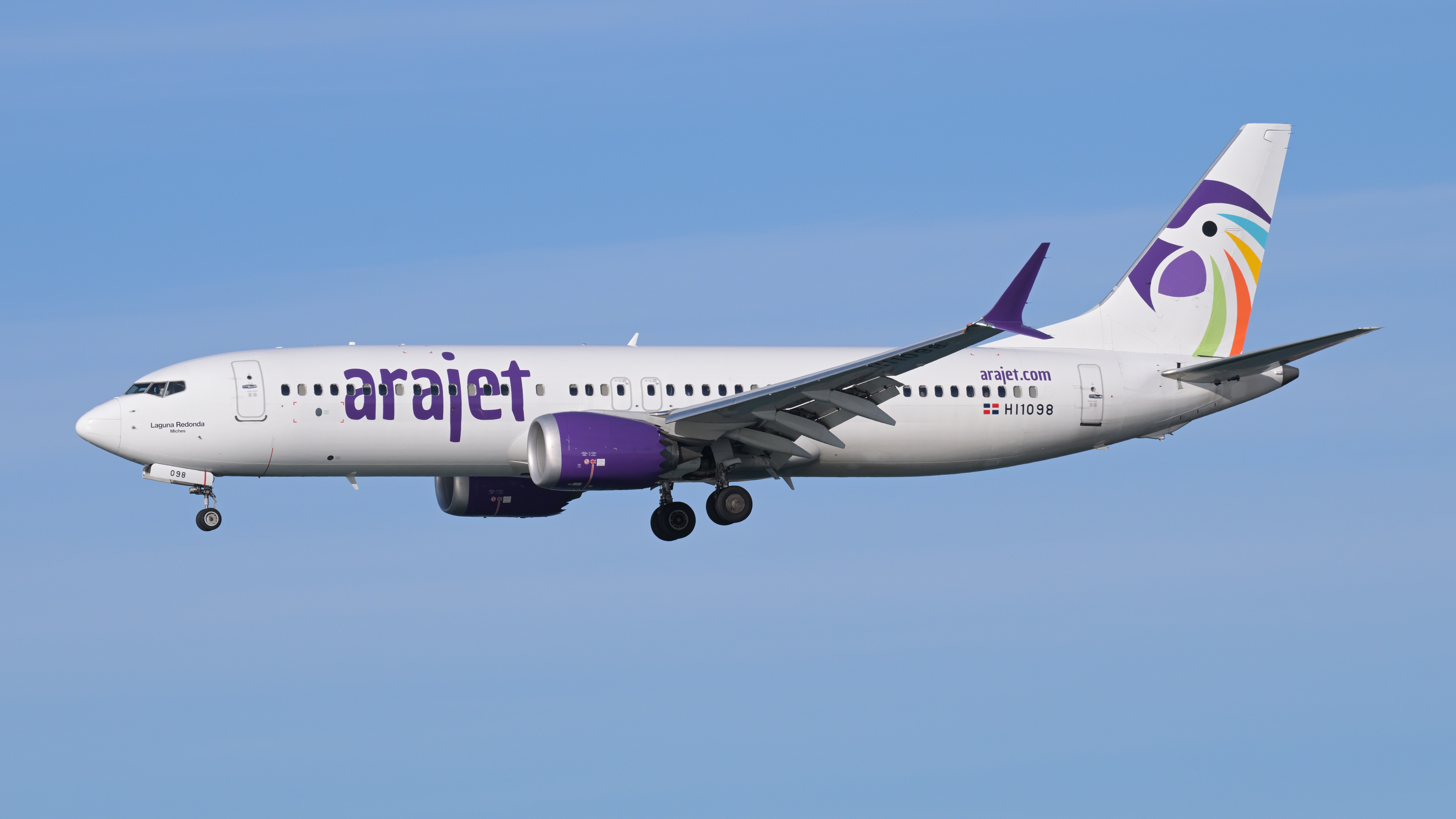
- Arajet Boeing 737 MAX 8
IATA	ICAO	Call sign
DM	DWI	DOMINICAN
- Founded: 2014 (as Dominican Wings); 2021 (as Arajet)
- Commenced operations: 15 September 2022; 4 years ago
- AOC #: DWIA027A
- Hubs: Punta Cana; Santo Domingo–Las Américas
- Fleet size: 16
- Destinations: 30
- Headquarters: 18°28′32″N 69°55′38″W; Torre Silver Sun Gallery, Westpark, Avenida Tiradentes 32, esquina Avenida Gustavo Mejía Ricart, Ensanche Naco, Santo Domingo, Dominican Republic
- Key people: Víctor Miguel Pacheco Méndez (Founder & CEO)
- Employees: ~700 (September 2025)
- Website: www.arajet.com

Arajet, S.A., trading as Arajet, is the flag carrier and largest airline of the Dominican Republic, with headquarters in Santo Domingo. The airline provides low-cost flights to destinations in North America, the Caribbean, Central America, and South America. Operations began on 15 September 2022 with a flight to Barranquilla, Colombia.

== History ==
=== Early operations ===
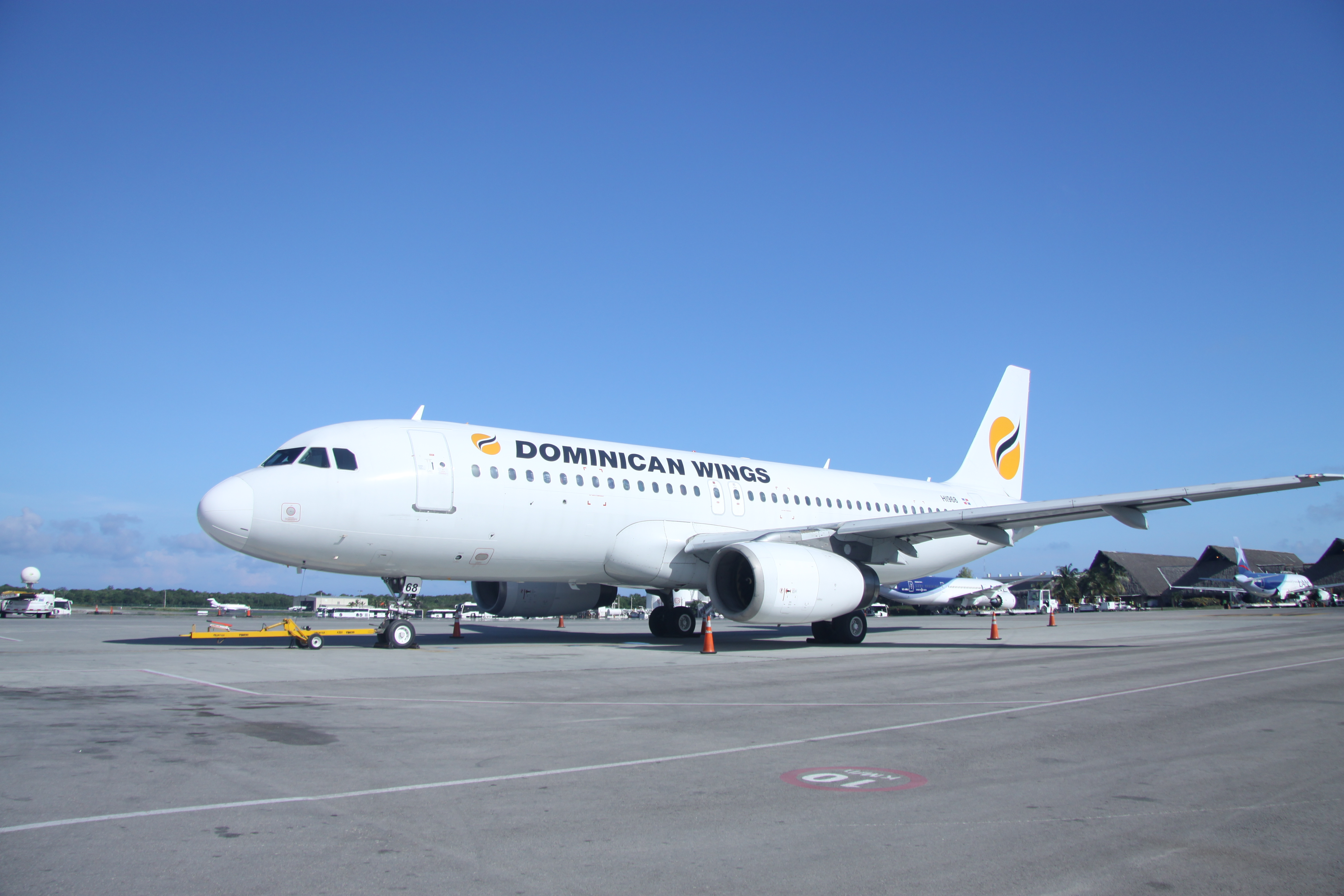
Dominican Wings Airbus A320-200

In late 2014, Dominican Wings received its air operator's certificate from the Dominican Republic's civil aviation authority and was authorized to offer charter flights between the Dominican Republic and Mexico, Trinidad and Tobago, and Argentina. Its first aircraft, an Airbus A320-200, was delivered on May 3, 2015.

=== Rebrand ===
In early 2018, it was announced that the airline would be transitioning from charter operations to scheduled ultra low-cost flights, investing $60 million into its relaunch. In September 2021, co-founders Víctor Miguel Pacheco Méndez and Mike Powell announced that the airline would rebrand to Arajet and would operate as a low-cost carrier offering flights throughout the Caribbean and the Americas. In November 2021, Junta de Aviación Civil approved Arajet's request to amend its certificate of economic authorization to include thirty new international routes.

Instituto Dominicano de Aviación Civil (IDAC), in collaboration with Dominican carrier Arajet, achieved the certification of two Dominican inspectors at Boeing's facilities to be able to inspect the operations of Boeing aircraft in December 2021. Pico Duarte was the company's first aircraft, a Boeing 737 MAX 8, named after the Caribbean's highest mountainous elevation and a nature preserve in the Dominican Republic, completed its painting process In February 2022. Registered HI-1026, arrived at Las Américas International Airport on March 3, 2022.

On March 14, 2022, Arajet S.A. was officially launched. Although the airline was backed by Bain Capital and Griffin Global Asset Management, Dominican Republic President Luis Abinader announced that it would be majority funded with Dominican capital. Boeing announced an order of twenty Boeing 737 MAX 200 aircraft, with options for fifteen more aircraft.

== Destinations ==
Served by Arajet as of May 2026 Intended to be served by Arajet

As of June 2025, the airline serves the following destinations:

Destinations
Country / Region	City	Airport	Notes	Refs.
Argentina	Buenos Aires	Ministro Pistarini International Airport		
Argentina	Córdoba	Ingeniero Aeronáutico Ambrosio L.V. Taravella International Airport		
Aruba	Oranjestad	Queen Beatrix International Airport		
Brazil	São Paulo	São Paulo/Guarulhos International Airport		
Canada	Montreal	Montréal–Trudeau International Airport		
Canada	Toronto	Toronto Pearson International Airport		
Chile	Santiago de Chile	Arturo Merino Benítez International Airport		
Colombia	Bogotá	El Dorado International Airport		
Colombia	Barranquilla	Ernesto Cortissoz International Airport	Terminated	
Colombia	Cali	Alfonso Bonilla Aragón International Airport	Terminated	
Colombia	Cartagena	Rafael Núñez International Airport		
Colombia	Medellín	José María Córdova International Airport		
Costa Rica	San José	Juan Santamaría International Airport		
Curaçao	Willemstad	Curaçao International Airport		
Dominican Republic	Punta Cana	Punta Cana International Airport	Hub	
Dominican Republic	Santiago de los Caballeros	Cibao International Airport	Terminated	
Dominican Republic	Santo Domingo	Las Américas International Airport	Hub	
Ecuador	Guayaquil	José Joaquín de Olmedo International Airport		
Ecuador	Quito	Mariscal Sucre International Airport		
El Salvador	San Salvador	El Salvador International Airport		
Guatemala	Guatemala City	La Aurora International Airport		
Jamaica	Kingston	Norman Manley International Airport		
Mexico	Mexico City	Felipe Ángeles International Airport		
Mexico	Cancún	Cancún International Airport		
Mexico	Monterrey	Monterrey International Airport	Terminated	
Peru	Lima	Jorge Chávez International Airport		
Puerto Rico	San Juan	Luis Muñoz Marín International Airport		
Sint Maarten	Philipsburg	Princess Juliana International Airport		
United States	Boston	Logan International Airport		
United States	Chicago	O'Hare International Airport		
United States	Miami	Miami International Airport		
United States	Newark	Newark Liberty International Airport		
United States	Orlando	Orlando Sanford International Airport		
Uruguay	Montevideo	Carrasco International Airport	Begins 3 March 2027	

In addition to the stated destinations Arajet has plans to fly to:

- Bahamas: Nassau
- Barbados: Bridgetown
- Belize: Belize City
- Bolivia: Santa Cruz de la Sierra
- Brazil: Manaus, Rio de Janeiro, Salvador
- Cayman Islands
- Cuba
- Guadeloupe
- Guyana: Georgetown
- Haiti: Port-au-Prince
- Honduras: San Pedro Sula
- Martinique: Fort-de-France
- Panama: Panama City
- Paraguay: Asunción
- Trinidad and Tobago: Port of Spain
- United States: Providence

=== Interline agreements ===
- Hahn Air

== Fleet ==
=== Current fleet ===
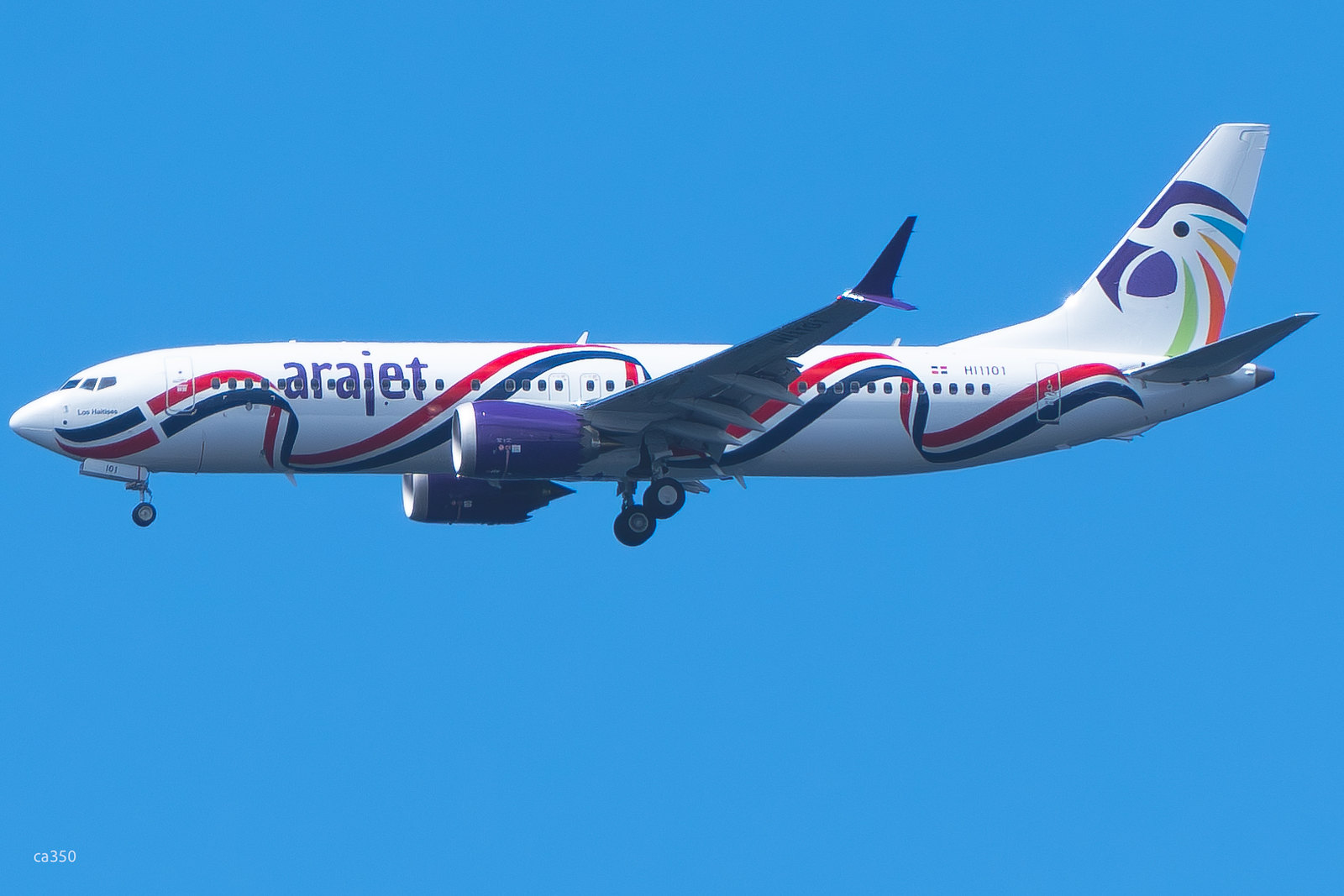
Arajet Boeing 737 MAX 8 with the Dominican flag livery

As of July 2026, Arajet operates the following aircraft:

Arajet fleet
Aircraft	In service	Orders	Passengers		
Aircraft	In service	Orders	W	Y	Total
Boeing 737 MAX 8	16	14	8	177	185
Boeing 737 MAX 200	—	20			
Total	16	34			

== See also ==
- List of airlines of the Dominican Republic
