= Anhui Normal University =

University in China

- 安徽师范大学
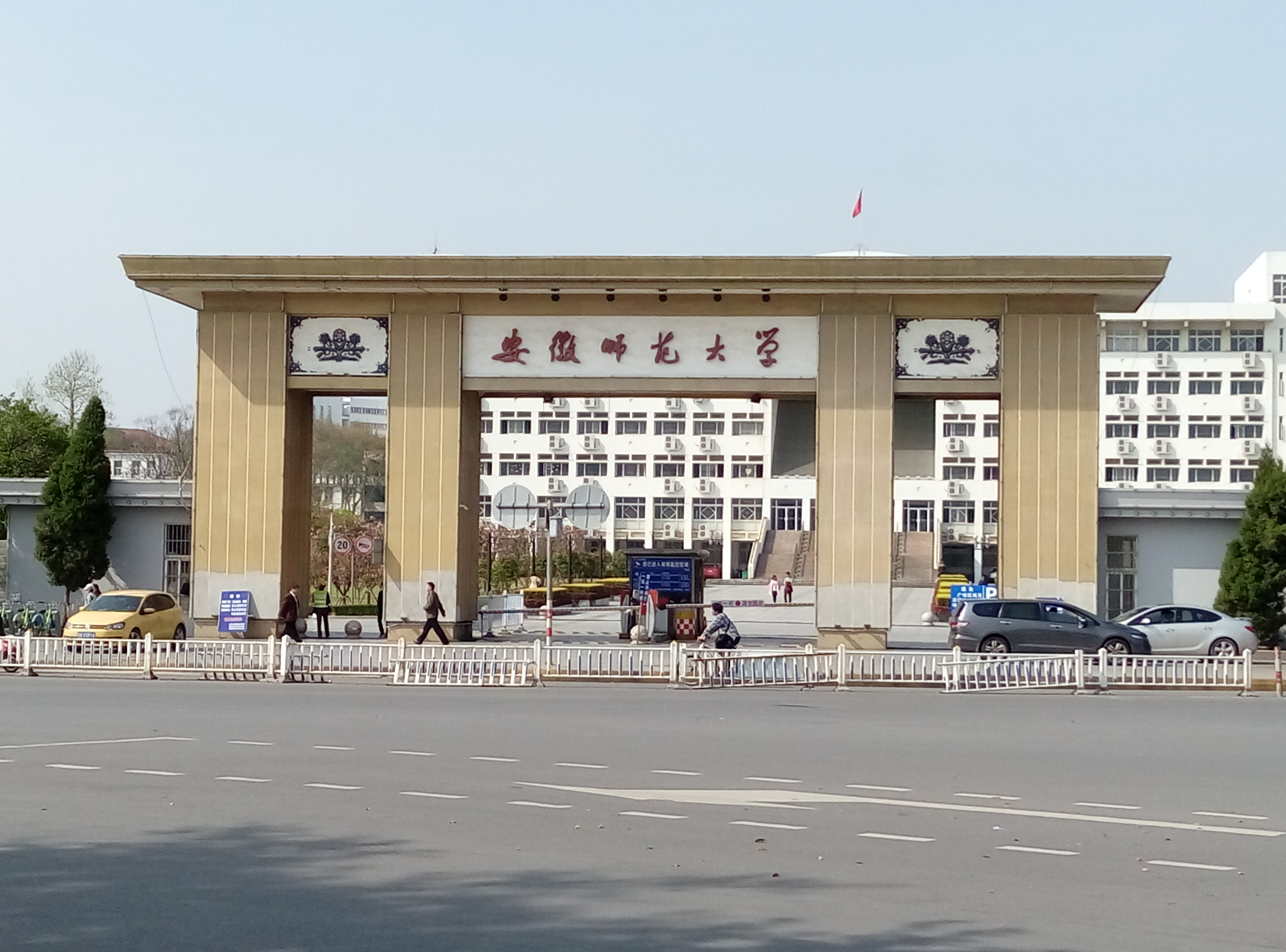
- Other name: 安師大
- Motto: "厚德(Ethic) 重教(Educate) 博学(Eclectic) 笃行(Endeavour)"
- Type: Public
- Established: 1928
- Location: Wuhu; 31.2871219°N 118.372994°E
- Campus: 3
- Colors: Blue and gold
- Website: www.ahnu.edu.cn

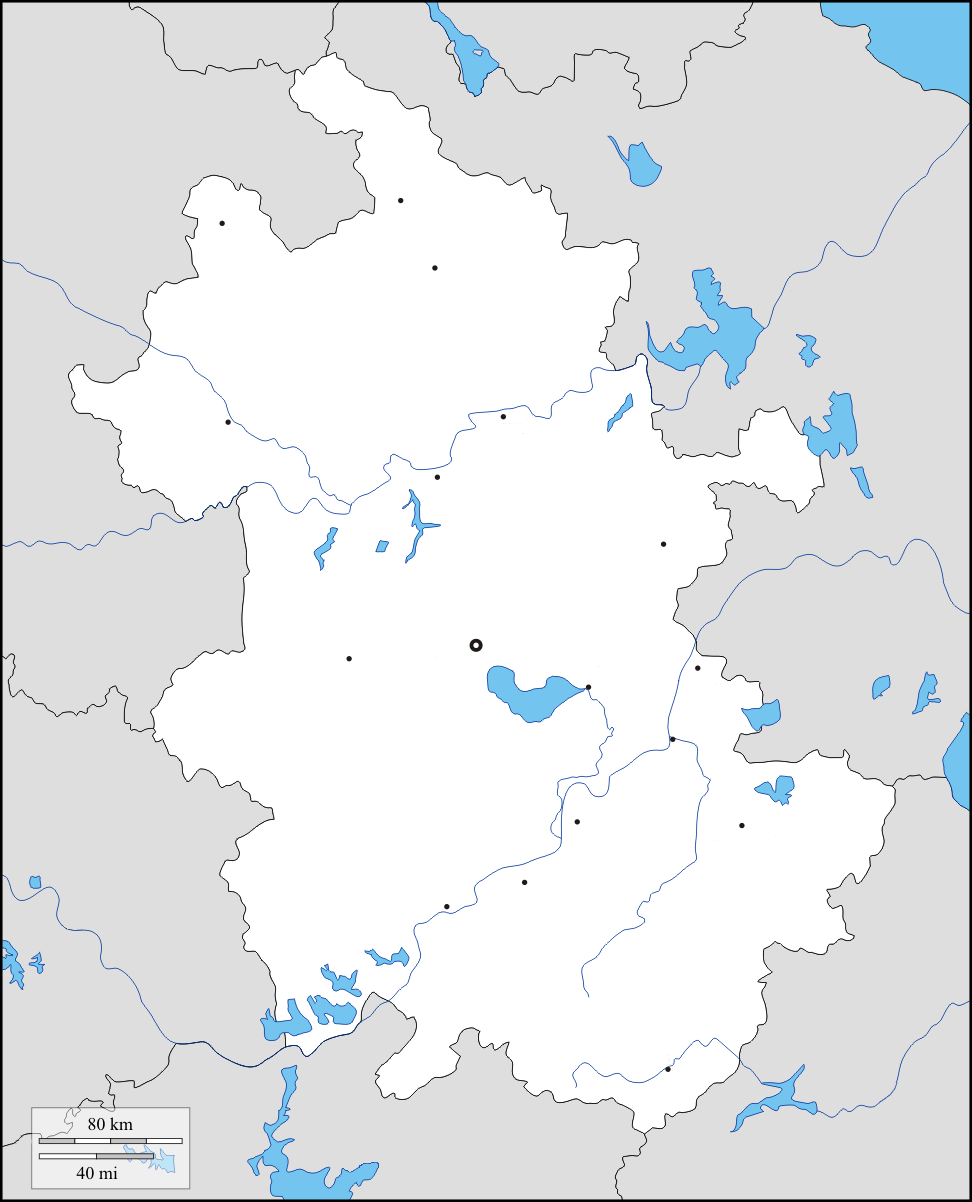
- Location in Anhui Anhui Normal University (China)

Anhui Normal University
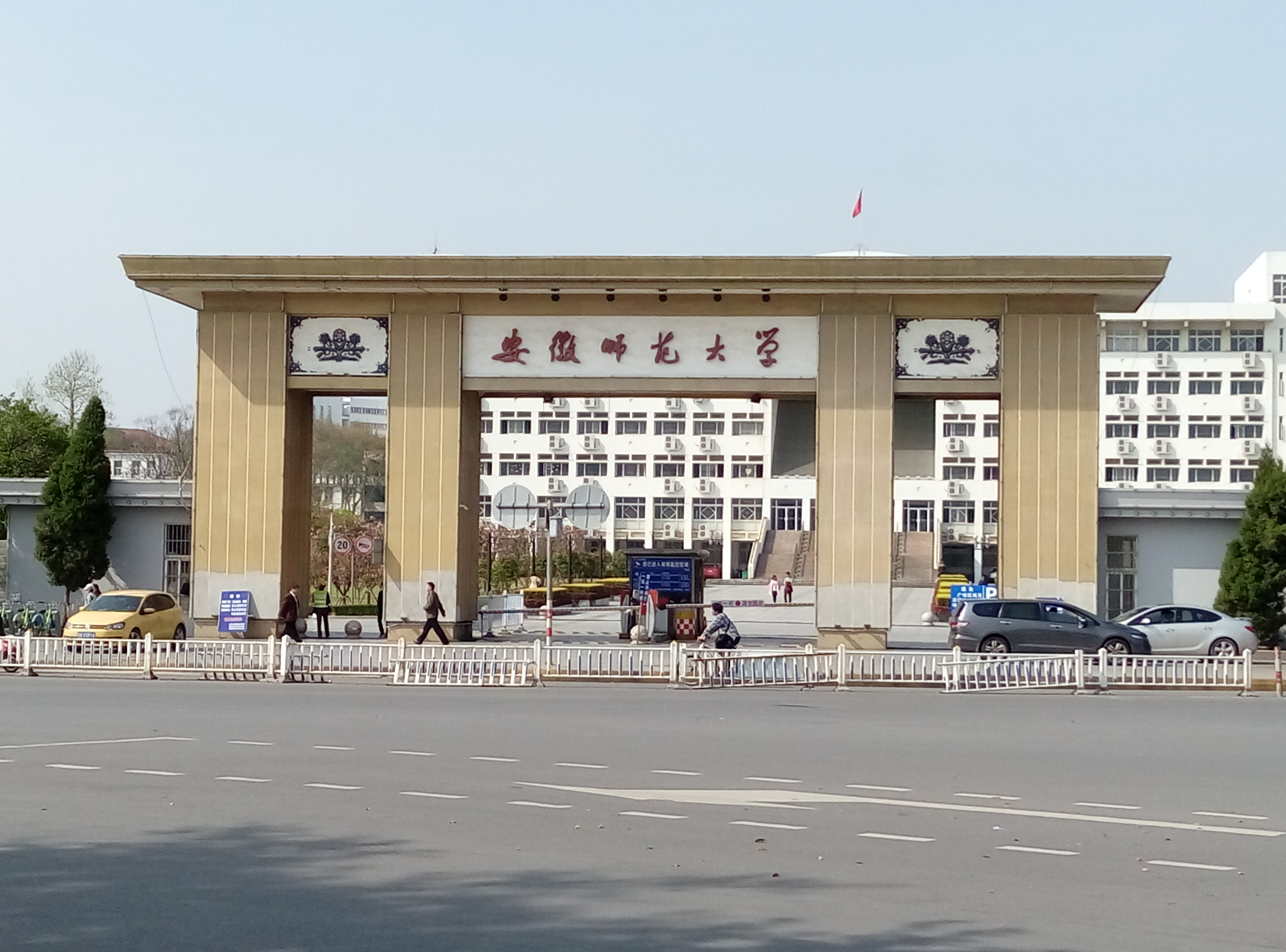
- Gate of the Old Campus
- Simplified Chinese: 安徽师范大学
- Traditional Chinese: 安徽師範大學
Transcriptions
Standard Mandarin
- Hanyu Pinyin: Ānhuī Shīfàn Dàxué

Anhui Normal University (Chinese: 安徽师范大学; pinyin: Ānhuī Shīfàn Dàxué) is an institution of higher learning in Wuhu, Anhui Province, China.

Approved by the State Council in 1972, it was officially renamed Anhui Normal University, and the name was written by Guo Moruo.

The College of International Education (Chinese: 国际教育学院; pinyin: Guójì Jiàoyù Xuéyuàn) usually has over 150 foreign students of many nationalities including Cuban, British, French, German, Egyptian, Korean, Vietnamese, Thai, Yemenese, Japanese, Russian, Pakistan etc.

== Introduction ==
Anhui Normal University is the oldest institution of higher education in Anhui Province and also one of the national comprehensive universities established at early stage. The predecessor of the school was the Provincial Anhui University, which was founded in Anqing in 1928. It was renamed the National Anhui University in 1946, and it was moved to Wuhu in December 1949. Later, it went through several stages of school running, including Anhui Teachers College, Hefei Teachers College, Southern Anhui University, and Anhui Agricultural and Mechanical University. In 1972, with the approval of the State Council, it was officially named Anhui Normal University. In 2005, Wuhu Teachers College merged into Anhui Normal University.

At present, the university has 16 colleges, 7 doctoral programs, 72 post graduated programs, 56 undergraduate programs. So far, there are 35,000 students from different provinces, more than 2600 teaching staffs, among them over 580 are professors and associate professors. The university has three campuses. It has an area of more than 3300 Mu (about 230 hectares), construction area of about 7.2 million square meters. The library comprises 2.576 million volumes of books, among which there are over 600 kinds of classical collections. It also has domestic and international natural resources and data bank.

The university attaches great importance to both domestic and international exchanges in education, and has established and developed long term friendly cooperation with several dozens of universities, research institutes, academic organisations in U.S.A., England, Germany, Sweden, Finland, Japan, Korea, Vietnam, Canada, and regions of Hong Kong, Macao and Taiwan, and has conducted all sorts of academic exchanges and cooperation.

The university is one of the earliest batched institutions of higher education appointed by the State to receive Chinese government scholarship international students, and one of the first national bases of Chinese language and culture to Overseas Chinese. Since 1985 it has received nearly 3000 foreign students from more than 40 countries for long and short term training.

== Majors ==
The Anhui normal university offers courses for foreign student of different countries to study.

Undergraduate(4 years)
Chinese language and Literature	Mechanical Engineering Music and performance
Painting Animation	Politics and administration, Law
Education, Kindergarten studies	Public facilities and management, Land and natural resources
Mathematics, Applied Mathematics, Physics	Chemistry, Applied chemistry
Environmental science, Geographical science	Teaching Chinese as a second language, Adverstising
Composition and technology theory, Fine arts	English, Russian
Social work, History	Labour and natural resources management, Financial affairs management
Education and technology, Community training	Electronic Information engineering, Computer science and technology
Material chemistry, Biotechnology	Geography and information system, Photography
News Art and design	Japanese Ideology and politics, education
Economics, Tourism management	Physical education, Sports training
Communication engineering, Ecology	Biochemistry, Psychology

Note:

1. Students who want a refresher course can choose from the majors mentioned above.

2. All the classes are taught in Chinese. Students with no Chinese foundation can come to the university and study Chinese for one semester or one year.

- Postgraduate (three years)
- Doctorate (three years)

== Gallery of the campus ==
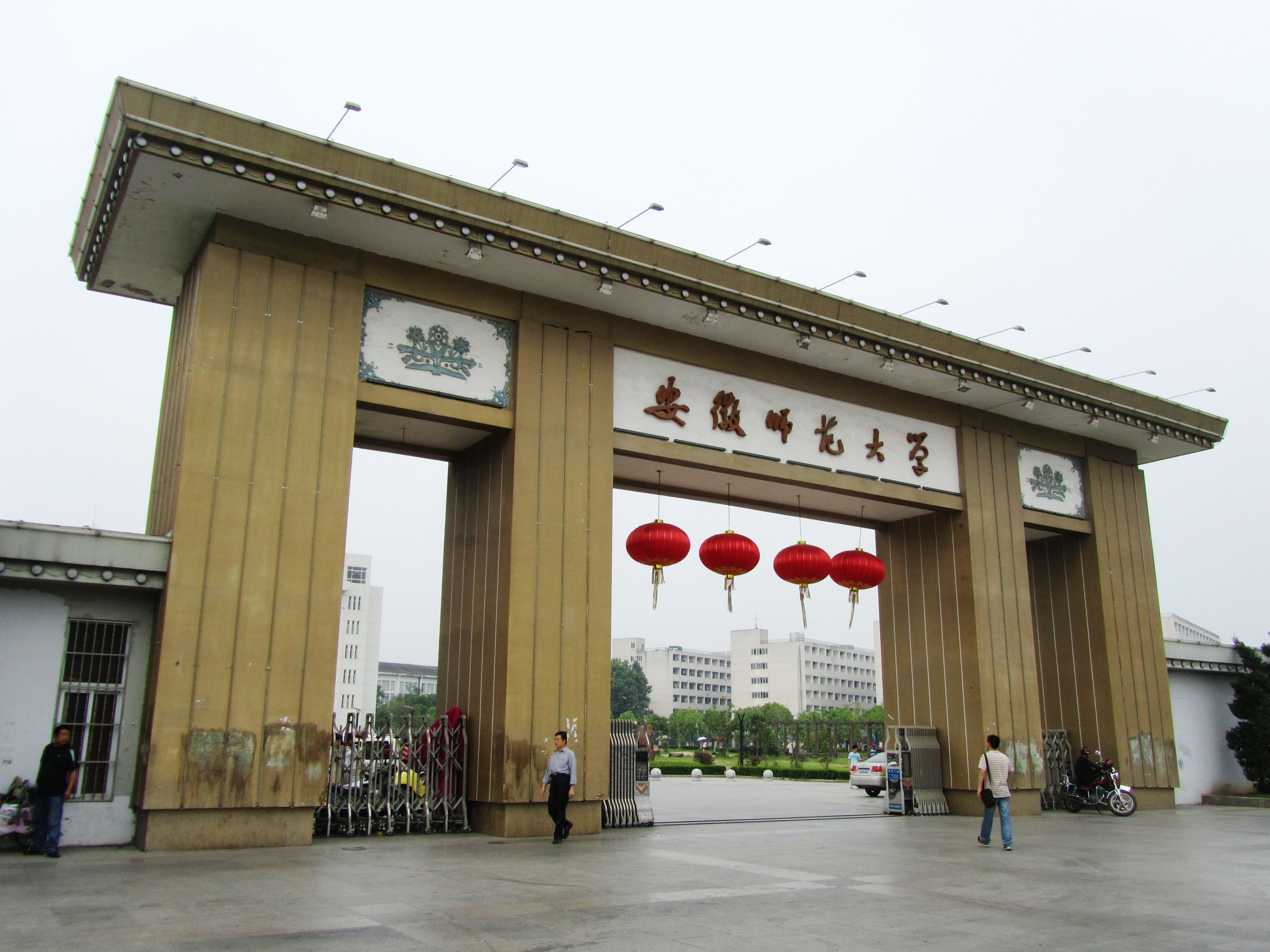
Entrance of the university, at the old campus.

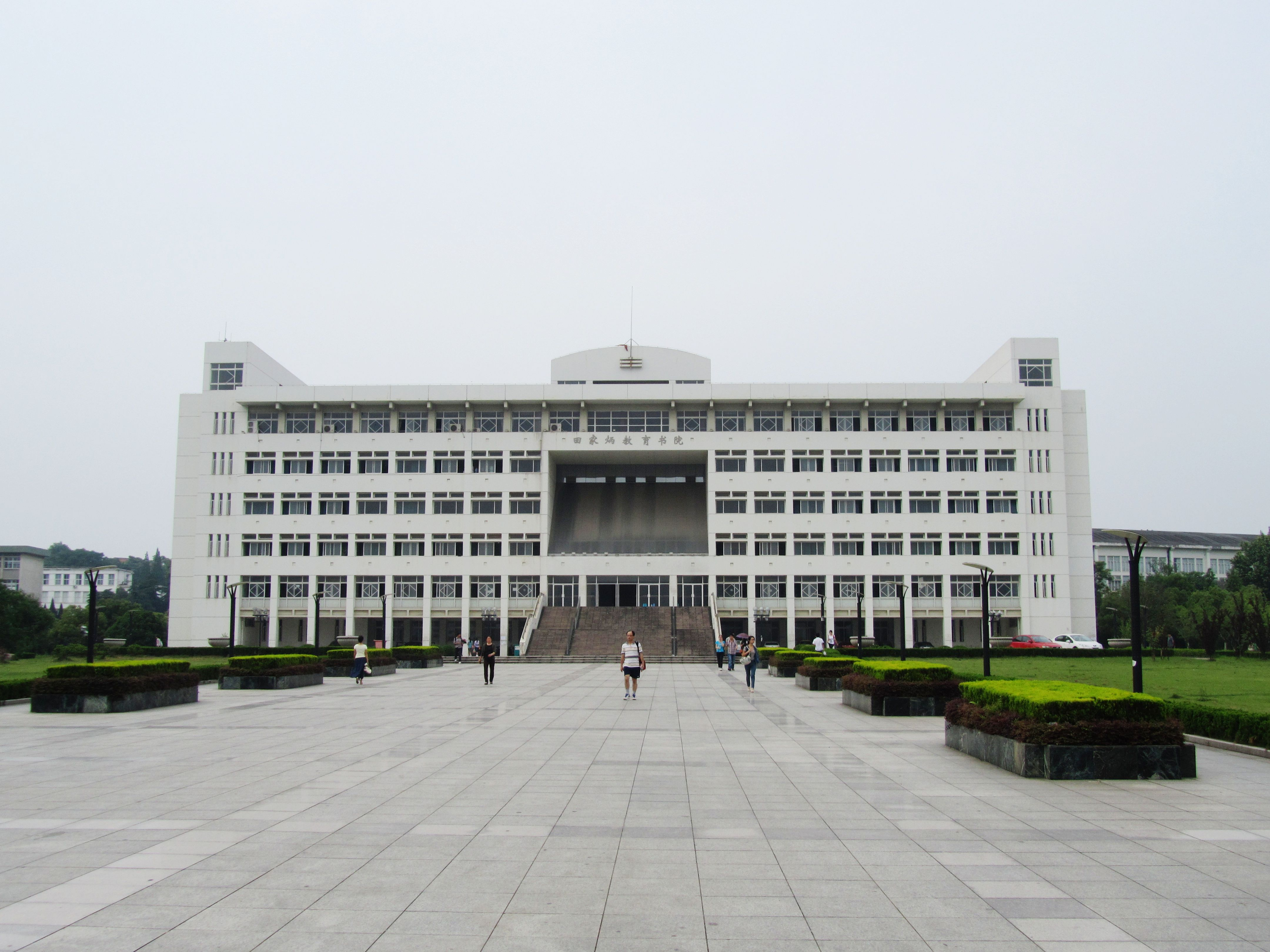
Tin Ka Ping College of Education, College of Educational Science

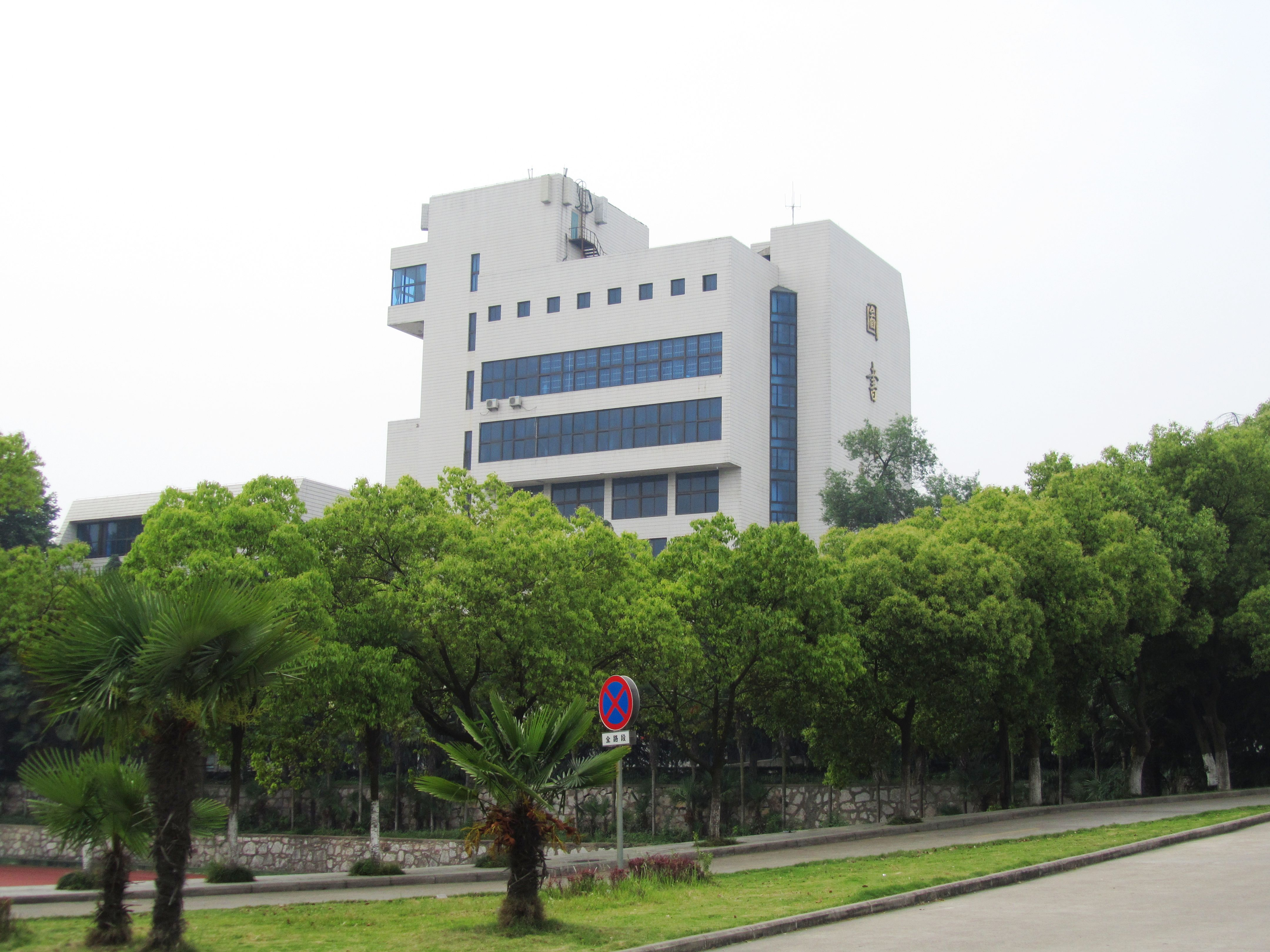
The Library of Zheshan

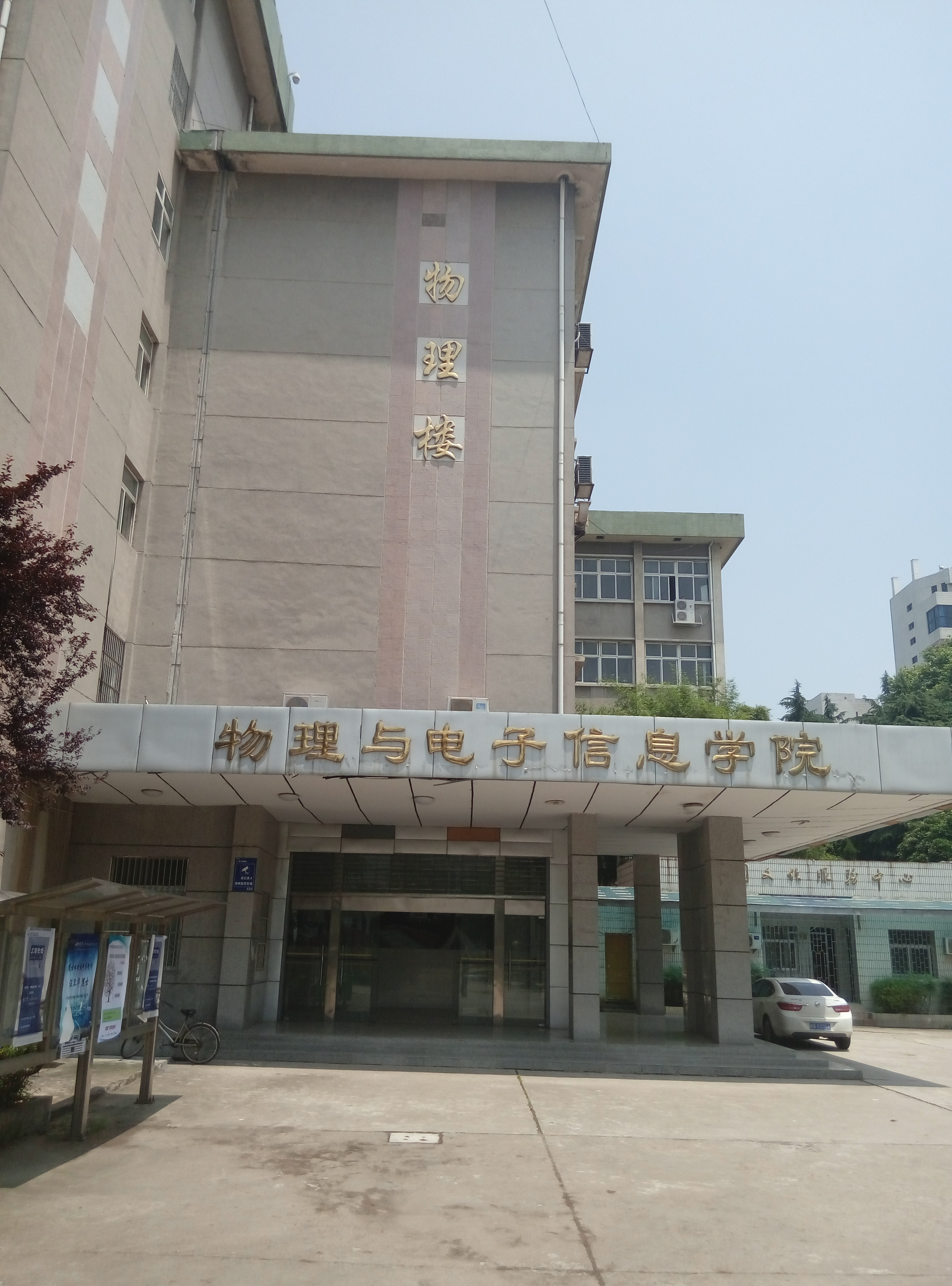
SPEI (School of Physics and Electronic Information), Building of Physics

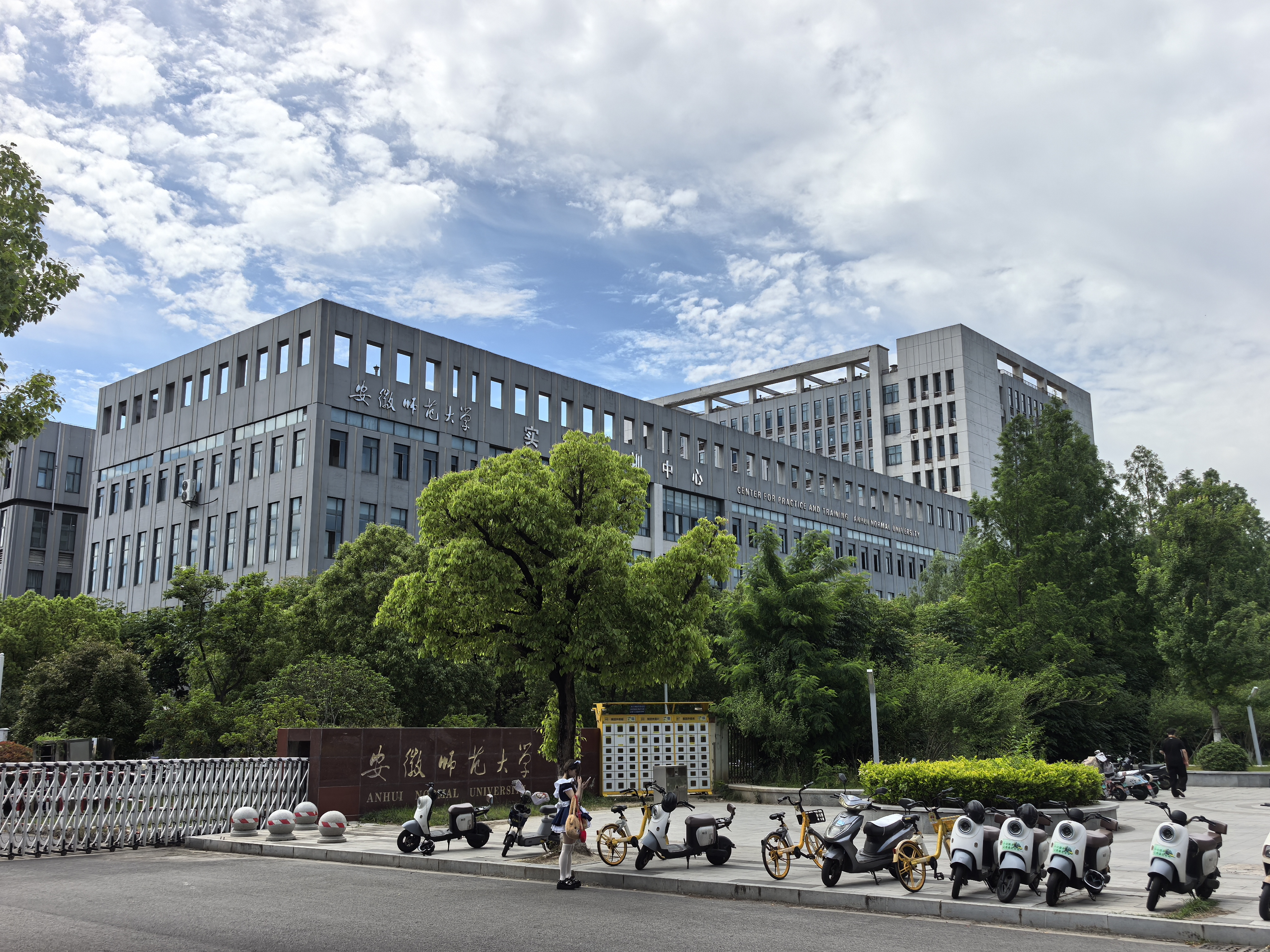
East Gate of Huajin Campus

== See also ==
- List of universities in China
