= List of Condor destinations =

As of December 2025, German airline Condor operates year-round and seasonal scheduled flights to the following destinations:

== Destinations ==
| Country / territory | City | Airport | Notes | Refs |
|---|---|---|---|---|
| Antigua and Barbuda | St John's | V. C. Bird International Airport | Seasonal | |
| Armenia | Yerevan | Zvartnots International Airport | Seasonal | |
| Austria | Klagenfurt | Klagenfurt Airport | Terminated | |
| Austria | Vienna | Vienna Airport | | |
| Bahrain | Manama | Bahrain International Airport | Terminated | |
| Barbados | Christ Church | Grantley Adams International Airport | Seasonal | |
| Brazil | Fortaleza | Pinto Martins – Fortaleza International Airport | Terminated | |
| Brazil | Recife | Recife/Guararapes–Gilberto Freyre International Airport | Terminated | |
| Brazil | Rio de Janeiro | Rio de Janeiro/Galeão International Airport | Terminated | |
| Brazil | Salvador da Bahia | Deputado Luís Eduardo Magalhães International Airport | Terminated | |
| Bulgaria | Burgas | Burgas Airport | Terminated | |
| Bulgaria | Varna | Varna Airport | Terminated | |
| Cambodia | Siem Reap | Siem Reap International Airport | Airport closed | |
| Canada | Calgary | Calgary International Airport | Seasonal | |
| Canada | Edmonton | Edmonton International Airport | Terminated | |
| Canada | Halifax | Halifax Stanfield International Airport | Terminated | |
| Canada | Toronto | Toronto Pearson International Airport | | |
| Canada | Vancouver | Vancouver International Airport | Seasonal | |
| Canada | Whitehorse | Erik Nielsen Whitehorse International Airport | Terminated | |
| Cape Verde | Boa Vista | Aristides Pereira International Airport | Terminated | |
| Cape Verde | Sal | Amílcar Cabral International Airport | Terminated | |
| China | Haikou | Haikou Meilan International Airport | Seasonal | |
| China | Hangzhou | Hangzhou Xiaoshan International Airport | Terminated | |
| China | Hefei | Hefei Xinqiao International Airport | Terminated | |
| China | Jinan | Jinan Yaoqiang International Airport | Terminated | |
| China | Sanya | Sanya Phoenix International Airport | Seasonal | |
| Costa Rica | San José | Juan Santamaría International Airport | Terminated | |
| Croatia | Dubrovnik | Dubrovnik Airport | Terminated | |
| Croatia | Rijeka | Rijeka Airport | Terminated | |
| Croatia | Split | Split Airport | Seasonal | |
| Croatia | Zadar | Zadar Airport | Terminated | |
| Cuba | Havana | José Martí International Airport | Terminated | |
| Cuba | Holguín | Frank País Airport | Terminated | |
| Cuba | Santa Clara | Abel Santamaría Airport | Terminated | |
| Cuba | Varadero | Juan Gualberto Gómez Airport | Terminated | |
| Curaçao | Willemstad | Curaçao International Airport | Terminated | |
| Cyprus | Larnaca | Larnaca International Airport | Seasonal | |
| Cyprus | Paphos | Paphos International Airport | Terminated | |
| Czech Republic | Prague | Václav Havel Airport Prague | | |
| Dominican Republic | La Romana | La Romana International Airport | Seasonal charter | |
| Dominican Republic | Puerto Plata | Gregorio Luperón International Airport | | |
| Dominican Republic | Punta Cana | Punta Cana International Airport | | |
| Dominican Republic | Santo Domingo | Las Américas International Airport | | |
| Egypt | Giza | Sphinx International Airport | Terminated | |
| Egypt | Hurghada | Hurghada International Airport | | |
| Egypt | Marsa Alam | Marsa Alam International Airport | Terminated | |
| Egypt | Sharm El Sheikh | Sharm El Sheikh International Airport | Terminated | |
| France | Paris | Charles de Gaulle Airport | | |
| Gambia | Banjul | Banjul International Airport | Terminated | |
| Georgia | Tbilisi | Tbilisi International Airport | Begins June 2026 | |
| Germany | Berlin | Berlin Brandenburg Airport | Base | |
| Germany | Berlin | Berlin Schönefeld Airport | Airport closed | |
| Germany | Bremen | Bremen Airport | Terminated | |
| Germany | Cologne/Bonn | Cologne Bonn Airport | Seasonal | |
| Germany | Dortmund | Dortmund Airport | Seasonal | |
| Germany | Dresden | Dresden Airport | Terminated | |
| Germany | Düsseldorf | Düsseldorf Airport | Base | |
| Germany | Frankfurt | Frankfurt Airport | Base | |
| Germany | Friedrichshafen | Friedrichshafen Airport | Seasonal | |
| Germany | Hamburg | Hamburg Airport | Base | |
| Germany | Hanover | Hannover Airport | Terminated | |
| Germany | Karlsruhe/Baden-Baden | Karlsruhe/Baden-Baden Airport | Terminated | |
| Germany | Leipzig/Halle | Leipzig/Halle Airport | Base | |
| Germany | Munich | Munich Airport | Base | |
| Germany | Münster | Münster Osnabrück Airport | Seasonal | |
| Germany | Nuremberg | Nuremberg Airport | Seasonal | |
| Germany | Paderborn | Paderborn Lippstadt Airport | Terminated | |
| Germany | Rostock | Rostock–Laage Airport | Terminated | |
| Germany | Stuttgart | Stuttgart Airport | Base | |
| Germany | Sylt | Sylt Airport | Terminated | |
| Greece | Chania (Crete) | Chania International Airport | Seasonal | |
| Greece | Corfu | Corfu International Airport | Seasonal | |
| Greece | Heraklion (Crete) | Heraklion International Airport | Seasonal | |
| Greece | Kalamata | Kalamata International Airport | Seasonal | |
| Greece | Karpathos | Karpathos Island National Airport | Seasonal | |
| Greece | Kavala | Kavala International Airport | Seasonal | |
| Greece | Kefalonia | Kephalonia International Airport | Seasonal | |
| Greece | Kos | Kos International Airport | Seasonal | |
| Greece | Mykonos | Mykonos Airport | Terminated | |
| Greece | Preveza/Lefkada | Aktion National Airport | Seasonal | |
| Greece | Rhodes | Rhodes International Airport | Seasonal | |
| Greece | Samos | Samos International Airport | Seasonal | |
| Greece | Santorini | Santorini (Thira) International Airport | Terminated | |
| Greece | Sitia | Sitia Public Airport | Terminated | |
| Greece | Skiathos | Skiathos International Airport | Seasonal | |
| Greece | Thessaloniki | Thessaloniki Airport | Terminated | |
| Greece | Volos | Nea Anchialos National Airport | Seasonal | |
| Greece | Zakynthos | Zakynthos International Airport | Seasonal | |
| Grenada | St. George's | Maurice Bishop International Airport | Terminated | |
| Guadeloupe | Pointe-à-Pitre | Pointe-à-Pitre International Airport | Terminated | |
| Hungary | Budapest | Budapest Ferenc Liszt International Airport | Seasonal | |
| India | Goa | Dabolim Airport | Terminated | |
| Indonesia | Denpasar | Ngurah Rai International Airport | Seasonal charter | |
| Italy | Cagliari | Cagliari Elmas Airport | Terminated | |
| Italy | Catania | Catania–Fontanarossa Airport | Terminated | |
| Italy | Comiso | Comiso Airport | Terminated | |
| Italy | Genoa | Genoa Cristoforo Colombo Airport | Seasonal charter | |
| Italy | Lamezia Terme | Lamezia Terme International Airport | Seasonal | |
| Italy | Milan | Milan Malpensa Airport | | |
| Italy | Naples | Naples International Airport | Terminated | |
| Italy | Olbia | Olbia Costa Smeralda Airport | Seasonal | |
| Italy | Palermo | Falcone Borsellino Airport | Terminated | |
| Italy | Rome | Rome Fiumicino Airport | | |
| Italy | Venice | Venice Marco Polo Airport | Seasonal | |
| Israel | Tel Aviv | Ben Gurion Airport | | |
| Iraq | Sulaymaniyah | Sulaymaniyah International Airport | | |
| Jamaica | Montego Bay | Sangster International Airport | Seasonal | |
| Kenya | Mombasa | Moi International Airport | Seasonal | |
| Kenya | Nairobi | Jomo Kenyatta International Airport | Terminated | |
| Kosovo | Pristina | Pristina International Airport | Seasonal | |
| Lebanon | Beirut | Beirut–Rafic Hariri International Airport | | |
| Malaysia | Kuala Lumpur | Kuala Lumpur International Airport | Terminated | |
| Maldives | Gan | Gan International Airport | Terminated | |
| Maldives | Malé | Velana International Airport | Seasonal | |
| Malta | Valletta | Malta International Airport | Terminated | |
| Martinique | Fort-de-France | Martinique Aimé Césaire International Airport | Seasonal | |
| Mauritius | Port Louis | Sir Seewoosagur Ramgoolam International Airport | | |
| Mexico | Cancún | Cancún International Airport | | |
| Mexico | San José del Cabo | Los Cabos International Airport | Seasonal | |
| Montenegro | Tivat | Tivat Airport | Terminated | |
| Morocco | Agadir | Agadir–Al Massira Airport | Seasonal | |
| Morocco | Marrakesh | Marrakesh Menara Airport | Terminated | |
| Myanmar | Yangon | Yangon International Airport | Terminated | |
| Namibia | Windhoek | Hosea Kutako International Airport | Terminated | |
| Panama | Panama City | Tocumen International Airport | | |
| Portugal | Faro | Faro Airport | Seasonal | |
| Portugal | Funchal | Madeira Airport | | |
| Portugal | Porto Santo | Porto Santo Airport | Terminated | |
| Puerto Rico | San Juan | Luis Muñoz Marín International Airport | Terminated | |
| Romania | Constanța | Mihail Kogălniceanu International Airport | Terminated | |
| Russia | Sochi | Sochi International Airport | Terminated | |
| Seychelles | Mahé | Seychelles International Airport | Seasonal | |
| South Africa | Cape Town | Cape Town International Airport | Seasonal | |
| South Africa | Johannesburg | O. R. Tambo International Airport | Seasonal | |
| Spain | Arrecife | Lanzarote Airport | | |
| Spain | Barcelona | Josep Tarradellas Barcelona–El Prat Airport | Seasonal | |
| Spain | Fuerteventura | Fuerteventura Airport | | |
| Spain | Ibiza | Ibiza Airport | Seasonal | |
| Spain | Jerez de la Frontera | Jerez Airport | Seasonal | |
| Spain | Las Palmas | Gran Canaria Airport | | |
| Spain | Málaga | Málaga Airport | Seasonal | |
| Spain | Menorca | Menorca Airport | Terminated | |
| Spain | Palma de Mallorca | Palma de Mallorca Airport | Seasonal | |
| Spain | Santa Cruz de La Palma | La Palma Airport | | |
| Spain | Tenerife | Tenerife South Airport | | |
| Sri Lanka | Colombo | Bandaranaike International Airport | Terminated | |
| St Lucia | Vieux Fort | Hewanorra International Airport | Terminated | |
| Switzerland | Zurich | Zurich Airport | Base | |
| Switzerland; France; Germany | Basel; Mulhouse; Freiburg | EuroAirport Basel Mulhouse Freiburg | Seasonal | |
| Taiwan | Taipei | Chiang Kai-shek International Airport | Terminated | |
| Tanzania | Kilimanjaro | Kilimanjaro International Airport | Terminated | |
| Tanzania | Zanzibar | Abeid Amani Karume International Airport | Seasonal | |
| Thailand | Bangkok | Suvarnabhumi Airport | | |
| Thailand | Phuket | Phuket International Airport | | |
| Trinidad and Tobago | Scarborough | A.N.R. Robinson International Airport | Seasonal | |
| Tunisia | Djerba | Djerba–Zarzis International Airport | Terminated | |
| Tunisia | Enfidha | Enfidha–Hammamet International Airport | Terminated | |
| Tunisia | Monastir | Monastir Habib Bourguiba International Airport | Terminated | |
| Turkey | Antalya | Antalya Airport | Seasonal | |
| Turkey | Bodrum | Milas–Bodrum Airport | Terminated | |
| Turkey | Dalaman | Dalaman Airport | Terminated | |
| Turkey | İzmir | İzmir Adnan Menderes Airport | Terminated | |
| United Arab Emirates | Abu Dhabi | Zayed International Airport | | |
| United Arab Emirates | Dubai | Al Maktoum International Airport | Terminated | |
| United Arab Emirates | Dubai | Dubai International Airport | Seasonal | |
| United Arab Emirates | Sharjah | Sharjah International Airport | Terminated | |
| United Kingdom | London | Gatwick Airport | Begins April 2026 | |
| United States | Anchorage | Ted Stevens Anchorage International Airport | Seasonal | |
| United States | Austin | Austin–Bergstrom International Airport | Terminated | |
| United States | Baltimore | Baltimore/Washington International Airport | Terminated | |
| United States | Boston | Logan International Airport | Seasonal | |
| United States | Denver | Denver International Airport | Terminated | |
| United States | Denver | Stapleton International Airport | Airport closed | |
| United States | Fairbanks | Fairbanks International Airport | Terminated | |
| United States | Fort Lauderdale | Fort Lauderdale–Hollywood International Airport | Terminated | |
| United States | Las Vegas | Harry Reid International Airport | Seasonal | |
| United States | Los Angeles | Los Angeles International Airport | | |
| United States | Minneapolis | Minneapolis–Saint Paul International Airport | Terminated | |
| United States | Miami | Miami International Airport | | |
| United States | New Orleans | Louis Armstrong New Orleans International Airport | Terminated | |
| United States | New York City | John F. Kennedy International Airport | | |
| United States | Orlando | Orlando International Airport | Terminated | |
| United States | Phoenix | Phoenix Sky Harbor International Airport | Terminated | |
| United States | Pittsburgh | Pittsburgh International Airport | Terminated | |
| United States | Portland, OR | Portland International Airport | Seasonal | |
| United States | Providence | Rhode Island T. F. Green International Airport | Terminated | |
| United States | San Antonio | San Antonio International Airport | Terminated | |
| United States | San Diego | San Diego International Airport | Terminated | |
| United States | San Francisco | San Francisco International Airport | Seasonal | |
| United States | Seattle | Seattle–Tacoma International Airport | | |
| Venezuela | Porlamar | Santiago Mariño Caribbean International Airport | Terminated | |
