= Cibao International Airport =

Airport in Santiago Province, Dominican Republic

Cibao International Airport Aeropuerto Internacional del Cibao
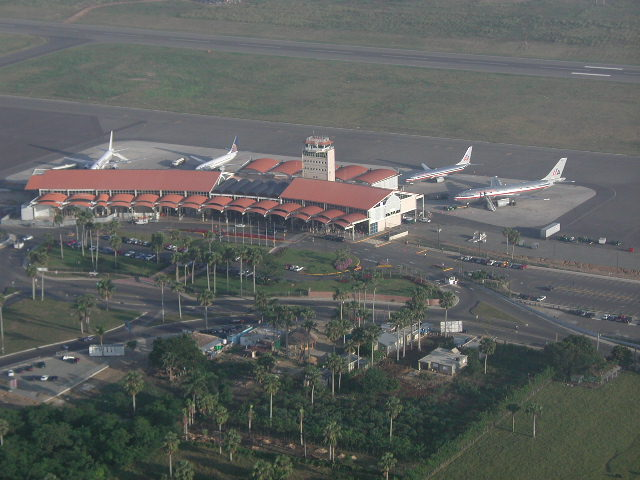
- IATA: STI; ICAO: MDST

Summary
- Airport type: Public
- Owner/Operator: Aeropuerto Internacional del Cibao S.A.
- Serves: Santiago de los Caballeros
- Location: Licey in Santiago Province, Dominican Republic
- Elevation AMSL: 565 ft (172 m)
- Coordinates: 19°24′22″N 070°36′17″W
- Website: Aeropuerto Cibao

Map
- Location of airport in the Dominican Republic

Runways
Direction	Length		Surface
Direction	ft	m	Surface
11/29	8,595	2,620	Asphalt/concrete

Helipads
Number	Length		Surface
Number	ft	m	Surface
H1	60	16	Asphalt

Statistics (2025)
- Total passengers: 2,209,666
- Based aircraft: 14
- Source: Cibao International Airport

Cibao International Airport (Spanish: Aeropuerto Internacional del Cibao) (IATA: STI, ICAO: MDST), also known as Santiago Airport, is located in Santiago de los Caballeros, Dominican Republic's second-largest city. The airport is located 15 kilometers (9.3 mi) southeast of Santiago City's center.

Since its inauguration, in terms of passenger traffic, Cibao International has been projected to become one of the busiest airports in the country. With over 2 million passengers in 2023, it is the country's third-busiest airport by passenger traffic and aircraft movements, after Punta Cana International Airport and Las Américas International Airport.

The air terminal mainly serves Dominicans residing in the United States, the Turks and Caicos Islands, and Puerto Rico, as well as Haitians residing in the Cibao Region. Recently many tourists and missionary workers are using Cibao International as a gateway to the Dominican Republic, with new routes to Spain and Colombia.

The airport contains Dominican Republic's busiest international route (STI-JFK), with over 1.078 million passengers every year as of 2023. JetBlue is the primary international operator, with up to twenty daily flights. The airport has a new terminal under construction expected to be inaugurated in mid-2026.

== History ==
Plans for the construction of the airport were first proposed in 1969. The Cibao International Airport Corporation was created on 29 March 1978, with the cooperation of José Armando Bermúdez (president), Víctor Espaillat, Manuel Arsenio Ureña, Dr. José Augusto Imbert, Mario Cáceres and Ing. Carlos S. Fondeur, who acquired the land necessary to build the new airport.

The construction of the airport began on 15 February 2000, and was finished in 2002. The airport was inaugurated on 18 March 2002, with two direct flights to San Juan operated by American Eagle.

In May 2002, Aeromar Líneas Aéreas Dominicanas made the first direct flight from Santiago to JFK Airport in New York. Later that month American Airlines and North American Airlines began direct flights to New York, Miami, and San Juan. A few months later Continental Airlines began direct flights from Newark. This was followed by direct service by JetBlue Airways and Delta Air Lines, both from New York.

In 2003, Aeromar Líneas Aéreas Dominicanas stopped their flights into Santiago after the airline ceased operations.

By the end of 2005, the airport's operator began one of the biggest expansions for this airport. They expanded the customs hall and rebuilt the west and east sides of the terminal. The terminal saw the addition of a second floor. This expansion was finalized in 2006. The runway's 400-meter (1,300 ft) expansion is currently in folders, but there is no scheduled date to begin or conclude this expansion yet.

In April 2008, Cibao International became the first airport in the country to eliminate fees for private planes, making it possible to increase tourism in the region.

On 27 November 2021, the works of infrastructure expansion started with presence of the president Luis Abinader. By 2025, the airport moved 2.2 million passengers yearly. By 2026, Air Europe increaselights frequency from two to three weekly flights.

== Infrastructure ==
=== International terminal ===
The airport's main terminal (international) has six gates (B1-B6).

=== Runway and taxiways ===
The runway length is 2,620 m, which can support all types of passenger airliners. The airport's operators are discussing the expansion of the runway to allow larger aircraft for long-haul flights from Europe. Cibao International Airport's taxiways are composed by two exits E-1 and E-2; E-1 is located on the west side of Runway 11/29, next to the direction 11 of that runway. E-2 is located in the east side of the runway, next to direction 29 of the runway.

=== Expansion ===
On 4 July 2021, the Cibao International Airport S.A. announced a plan to renovate most of the airport's existing infrastructure with a cost of $300 million. The airport is currently the third busiest in the country, and is expected to increase its services from 2 million of passengers in 2023 to 3.5+ million by 2040.

The design work was carried out by Luis Vidal + Architects, and it will be built under the direction of the Airport's technical team.

Since December 2021 the airport is under renovation. The Airport technical team estimates that the renovation process will take about 26 months. By mid 2025, local media estimate the total cost of the renovation of US$700 million and expected to be completed on Early 2027.

== Airlines and destinations ==
=== Passenger ===
Airlines	Destinations
Air Europa	Madrid
American Airlines	Miami; Seasonal: Philadelphia
Copa Airlines	Panama City–Tocumen
Delta Airlines	New York-JFK
Frontier Airlines	Seasonal: Philadelphia
InterCaribbean Airways	Providenciales
JetBlue	Fort Lauderdale, San Juan, Orlando
United Airlines	Newark

=== Cargo ===
Airlines	Destinations
Amerijet International	Miami, Puerto Plata

== Statistics ==
Busiest international routes from STI (2025)
Rank	City	Passengers	Carriers
1	New York-JFK, United States	1,078,673	Delta Air Lines, JetBlue
2	Newark, United States	490,697	JetBlue, United Airlines
3	Boston, United States	160,424	JetBlue
4	Miami, United States	146,695	American Airlines
5	Orlando, United States	109,405	JetBlue
6	San Juan, Puerto Rico	88,752	Frontier Airlines, JetBlue
7	Fort Lauderdale, United States	84,478	JetBlue
8	Madrid, Spain	31,421	Air Europa

== Incidents and accidents ==
- On 7 February 2008, a Caribair flight crashed close to La Romana, when its engines stopped. There were no fatalities, but the pilot had some injuries. The aircraft was a Britten Norman Islander BN-2A, registered as HI-653CA, and had departed on a flight to Punta Cana International Airport via La Romana International Airport at around 18:00 local time.

== See also ==
- List of the busiest airports in Dominican Republic
- List of the busiest airports in the Caribbean
