= Gregorio Luperón International Airport =

Gregorio Luperón International Airport Aeropuerto Internacional Gregorio Luperón
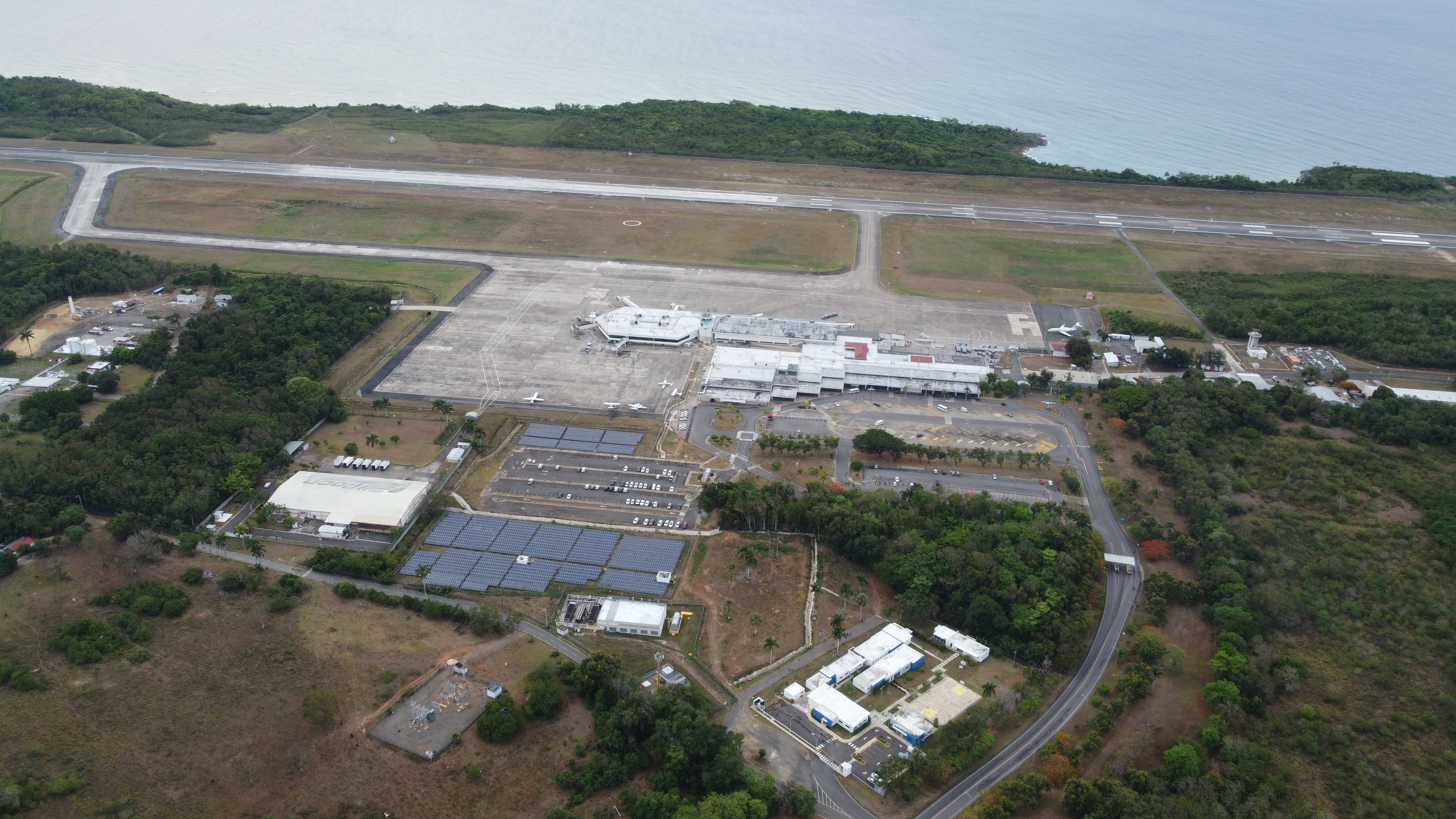
- IATA: POP; ICAO: MDPP

Summary
- Airport type: Public / military
- Operator: Aerodom
- Location: Sosúa, Puerto Plata Province, Dominican Republic
- Hub for: Air Century
- Elevation AMSL: 16 ft (4.9 m)
- Coordinates: 19°45′28″N 70°34′12″W
- Website: aerodom.com

Map
- Location of airport in Dominican Republic

Runways
Direction	Length		Surface
Direction	m	ft	Surface
08/26	3,081	10,108	Asphalt

Statistics (2024)
- Passengers: 847,702
- Aircraft operations: 5,869
- Sources: Departamento Aeroportuario WAD GCM

Gregorio Luperón International Airport (Spanish: Aeropuerto Internacional Gregorio Luperón) (IATA: POP, ICAO: MDPP), also known as Puerto Plata Airport, is located in Sosúa in the Puerto Plata Province, Dominican Republic. The airport is named after General Gregorio Luperón, a Dominican military and state leader. Capable of handling planes of all sizes, the airport has benefited from being in an area with many beaches, which are popular among charter airline passengers. The popularity of the city where it is located has also drawn a number of regularly scheduled passenger airlines over the years.

With over 704,000 passagers, It is the Dominican Republic's fourth busiest airport by passenger traffic and aircraft movements, after Punta Cana, Santo Domingo and Santiago de los Caballeros. American Airlines is the primary international operator.

== History ==
The facility opened in 1979 with the purpose of boosting tourism in the North region. It has a runway 3,081 meters long x 46 meters wide, with the capacity to receive wide-body aircraft, including the 747 and A340.

== Facilities ==
The main terminal building has 10 gates: five with boarding bridges on the satellite concourse, and two boarding bridges and three without in the frontal concourse. The terminal has been remodeled with new floors, escalators, immigration hall, departure hall and duty-free areas along with restaurants. The terminal can support four Boeing 747-400s simultaneously since renovations to the airport made in 2013/14.

== Airlines and destinations ==
=== Passenger ===
Airlines	Destinations
Air Canada	Seasonal: Montréal–Trudeau
Air Canada Rouge	Toronto–Pearson
Air Transat	Montréal–Trudeau, Québec City, Toronto–Pearson; Seasonal: Halifax, London (ON) (begins 15 December 2026), Ottawa
American Airlines	Miami; Seasonal: Charlotte
Condor	Frankfurt, Santo Domingo–Las Américas
Copa Airlines	Panama City–Tocumen
Delta Air Lines	Atlanta
Edelweiss Air	Seasonal: Zurich
Flair Airlines	Seasonal: Montréal–Trudeau (begins 18 December 2026), Toronto–Pearson (begins 19 December 2026)
JetBlue	New York–JFK; Seasonal: Boston
United Airlines	Newark
WestJet	Montréal–Trudeau, Toronto–Pearson; Seasonal: Calgary, Winnipeg (begins 22 December 2026)
Wingo	Seasonal: Bogotá

=== Cargo ===
Airlines	Destinations
Amerijet	Miami, Santiago de los Caballeros
DHL Aviation	Santiago de los Caballeros, Santo Domingo–Las Américas
IBC Airways	Miami

Notes

- ^1 Condor's flight from Puerto Plata to Frankfurt operates via Santo Domingo; however, the flight from Frankfurt to Puerto Plata is nonstop.

== Statistics ==
Top 10 busiest routes from Puerto Plata (2024)
Rank	City	Passengers	Carriers
1	(United States) Miami	158,558	American Airlines
2	(Canada) Toronto-Pearson	156,855	Air Canada Rouge, Air Transat, Sunwing Airlines, WestJet
3	(United States) New York–JFK	146,921	JetBlue
4	(Canada) Montreal-Trudeau	125,549	Air Canada Rouge, Air Transat, Sunwing Airlines
5	(United States) Newark	57,285	United Airlines
6	(United States) Charlotte	43,183	American Airlines
7	(Canada) Quebec City	25,195	Air Transat, Sunwing Airlines
8	(Germany) Frankfurt	20,853	Condor
9	(Canada) Ottawa	13,650	Air Transat, Sunwing Airlines
10	(Poland) Warsaw	13,650	LOT Polish Airlines

== Incidents ==
- On February 6, 1996, Birgenair Flight 301 was bound for Frankfurt, Germany, but crashed shortly after take-off from Puerto Plata Airport into the Atlantic Ocean 26 kilometres off-shore, killing all 176 passengers and 13 crew members aboard. Among them were 164 Germans. It was discovered later that one of the air speed indicators of the Boeing 757-200 was not working properly, confusing the pilots about whether the aircraft's speed was too fast or too slow.

== See also ==
- Transport in Dominican Republic
- List of airports in Dominican Republic
- List of the busiest airports in the Caribbean
