= List of the busiest airports in the Caribbean =

This is a list of the busiest airports in the Caribbean region by total passenger traffic. The present list intends to include airports located in the West Indies, or the island regions of the Caribbean. The ranking is ordered according to total passenger traffic per calendar or fiscal year. The statistics represent data reported by the airport operator, a government entity, or a news outlet.

== Busiest airports by total passenger traffic ==
Rank	Airport	City	Country/territory	IATA/ICAO	Passengers	Year
1	Luis Muñoz Marín International Airport	San Juan	Puerto Rico	SJU/TJSJ	13,643,689	2025
2	Punta Cana International Airport	Punta Cana	Dominican Republic	PUJ/MDPC	10,689,693	2025
3	Las Américas International Airport	Santo Domingo	Dominican Republic	SDQ/MDSD	5,221,168	2025
4	Sangster International Airport	Montego Bay	Jamaica	MBJ/MKJS	4,495,370	2025
5	Lynden Pindling International Airport	Nassau	The Bahamas	NAS/MYNN	3,991,820	2025
6	Queen Beatrix International Airport	Oranjestad	Aruba	AUA/TNCA	3,414,277	2025
7	José Martí International Airport	Havana	Cuba	HAV/MUHA	3,192,939	2023
8	Curaçao International Airport	Curaçao	Curaçao	CUR/TNCC	2,461,000	2025
9	Grantley Adams International Airport	Bridgetown	Barbados	BGI/TBPB	2,417,065	2025
10	Cibao International Airport	Santiago	Dominican Republic	STI/MDST	2,285,035	2025
11	Pointe-à-Pitre International Airport	Pointe-à-Pitre	Guadeloupe	PTP/TFFR	2,193,878	2025
12	Gustavo Rojas Pinilla International Airport	San Andrés	Colombia	ADZ/SKSP	2,100,000	2023
13	Martinique Aimé Césaire International Airport	Fort-de-France	Martinique	FDF/TFFF	1,918,785	2025
14	Piarco International Airport	Port of Spain	Trinidad and Tobago	POS/TTPP	1,791,163	2024
14	A. N. R. Robinson International Airport	Scarborough	Trinidad and Tobago	TAB/TTCP	1,791,163	2024
15	Norman Manley International Airport	Kingston	Jamaica	KIN/MKJP	1,750,000	2023
16	Princess Juliana International Airport	St. Maarten	Sint Maarten	SXM/TNCM	1,400,000	2023
17	Providenciales International Airport	Providenciales	Turks and Caicos Islands	PLS/MBPV	1,350,000	2022
18	Owen Roberts International Airport	Grand Cayman	Cayman Islands	GCM/MWCR	1,200,000	2023
19	Cyril E. King Airport	Saint Thomas	United States Virgin Islands	STT/TIST	932,265	2024
19	Henry E. Rohlsen Airport	Saint Croix	United States Virgin Islands	STX/TISX	932,265	2024
20	Gregorio Luperón International Airport	Puerto Plata	Dominican Republic	POP/MDPP	814,076	2025
21	Rafael Hernández Airport	Aguadilla	Puerto Rico	BQN/TJBQ	738,766	2024
22	Cozumel International Airport	Cozumel	Mexico	CZM/MMCZ	646,606	2025
23	Flamingo International Airport	Kralendijk	Bonaire	BON/TNCV	470,456	2024
24	V. C. Bird International Airport	St. John's	Antigua and Barbuda	ANU/TAPA	330,000	2024
25	Mercedita International Airport	Ponce	Puerto Rico	PSE/TJPS	281,901	2024
26	La Romana International Airport	La Romana	Dominican Republic	LRM/MDLR	235,026	2025
27	Gustaf III Airport	St. Jean	Saint Barthélemy	SBH/TFFJ	232,535	2025
28	Grand Case–Espérance Airport	Grand Case	(Collectivity of Saint Martin) Saint Martin	SFG/TFFG	213,925	2025
29	Samaná El Catey International Airport	Samaná	Dominican Republic	AZS/MDCY	97,665	2025
30	La Isabela International Airport	Santo Domingo	Dominican Republic	JBQ/MDJB	56,588	2025
31	Fernando Luis Ribas Dominicci Airport	San Juan	Puerto Rico	SIG/TJIG	35,871	2024
Outdated statistics
	Toussaint Louverture International Airport	Port au Prince	Haiti	PAP/MTPP	1,341,833	2012 (Note: Total passenger Traffic for 2012, as presented by Aéroport International Toussaint Louverture website.)
	Hewanorra International Airport	Vieux Fort Quarter	Saint Lucia	UVF/TLPL	632,478	2017 (Note: Total Passenger Traffic for 2017, according to Santa Lucia Air and Sea Ports Authority website)

Note: This list does not include all international airports in the Caribbean, as statistics are not available for each one of them.

== See also ==
- List of busiest airports in Africa
- List of the busiest airports in Central America
- List of the busiest airports in Dominican Republic
- List of the busiest airports in Europe
- List of the busiest airports in Latin America
- List of the busiest airports in North America
- List of the busiest airports in Puerto Rico
- List of the busiest airports in South America
- List of the busiest airports in the United States
