= Catey =

Catey may refer to:

- Catey Hill, editor, New York Daily News
- Samaná El Catey International Airport, airport under construction in the Dominican Republic
- An award given at The Catey Awards, a UK award ceremony for the hotel and catering industry
