= World2Fly Portugal =

Portuguese airline

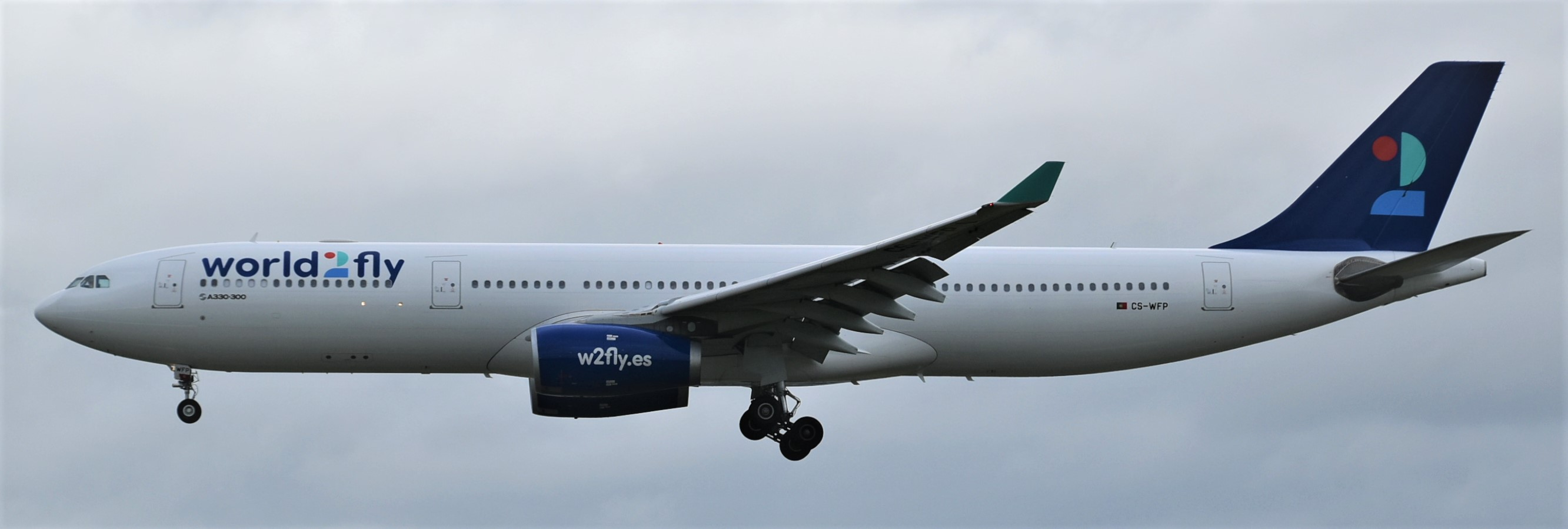
- World2Fly Portugal Airbus A330-300
IATA	ICAO	Call sign
3P	WPT	NEW BLUE
- Founded: 2021; 5 years ago
- Commenced operations: April 2021; 5 years ago
- Hubs: Lisbon Airport
- Fleet size: 1
- Destinations: 6
- Parent company: World2Fly
- Headquarters: Lisbon, Portugal
- Website: www.w2fly.pt

World2Fly Portugal is a Portuguese charter airline from Portugal and a subsidiary of Spanish airline World2Fly.

== History ==
The airline was established in 2021 to operate flights between Portugal and destinations mainly in the Caribbean. It is the subsidiary of Spanish airline World2Fly, which is owned by the Iberostar Group. The airline began operating during the 2022 summer season out of Lisbon Airport, using an Airbus A330-300. The airline flies charter flights to destinations including Cancún and Punta Cana.

== Destinations ==
World2Fly Portugal currently operates charter flights out of Lisbon to several destinations mainly in the Caribbean.

Country	City	Airport	Notes	Refs
Brazil	Fortaleza	Fortaleza Airport	Seasonal Charter	
Dominican Republic	Punta Cana	Punta Cana International Airport	Charter	
Jamaica	Montego Bay	Sangster International Airport	Charter	
Mexico	Cancún	Cancún International Airport	Charter	
Portugal	Lisbon	Lisbon Airport	Hub	
Portugal	Porto	Porto Airport	Seasonal Charter	
United States	Orlando	Orlando Sanford International Airport	Seasonal Charter	

== Fleet ==
As of August 2025, World2Fly Portugal operates the following aircraft:

World2Fly Portugal fleet
Aircraft	In service	Orders	Passengers	Notes
Airbus A330-300	1	—	388	
Total	1	—		

== See also ==
- List of airlines of Portugal
