= Punta Águila International Airport =

- IATA: ~~LRM~~; ICAO: ~~MDLR~~

Summary
- Owner: General Directorate of Civil Aviation
- Serves: La Romana
- Location: Casa de Campo, La Romana
- Opened: November 14, 1978; 47 years ago
- Closed: December 14, 2000
- Elevation AMSL: 14.8 ft / 4.5 m
- Coordinates: 18°24′40″N 68°56′29″W

Map
- Location of airport in Dominican Republic

Runways
Direction	Length		Surface
Direction	ft	m	Surface
~~12/30~~	~~6,571~~	~~2,003~~	~~Asphalt~~

Punta Águila International Airport, ~~(IATA: LRM, ICAO: MDLR)~~ also known as Cajuiles Airport or Casa de Campo Airport, was an international airport located in the Casa de Campo Resort in the southeastern coast of the Dominican Republic. The airport accommodated both commercial and general aviation flights, and served the city of La Romana and the Casa de Campo Resort. It was replaced on 14 December, 2000, when the newer La Romana International Airport opened.

== History ==
In the late 1960s, a runway was cleared on land in the Cajuiles area to serve private light aircraft and crop-spraying planes. The runway was compacted with gravel (caliche) and had a length of 600 meters, and from this the airport was named Cajuiles Airport. The runway was flanked by cans filled with oil that could be lit, allowing pilots to see the runway during foggy flying conditions or at night. At the beginning of the 1970s, the runway was extended to 1,800 meters, with a layer of asphalt and sand applied, allowing larger aircraft to operate from the airport. Cajuiles Airport began serving companies of the first free-trade industrial zone established in the Dominican Republic, connecting La Romana with the Caribbean and the United States. In August 1977, a four-inch asphalt surface was applied along the entire length of the runway, widening the runway by 25 meters.

On 14 November, 1978, the General Directorate of Civil Aviation authorized International Air Transit operations for passengers, cargo, and mail, officially converting Cajuiles Airport into an international airport. Because of its location, it subsequently received the name Punta Águila International Airport, becoming the first private international airport in the Dominican Republic to accommodate both commercial and general aviation flights.

The Casa de Campo resort was developed around the airfield, and eventually it was notably located in the center of the Teeth of the Dog golf course, only separated by 0.45 meter tall white picket fencing. Dozens of small private aircraft landed each day, and people would often be allowed to ride golf carts directly from the runway to the Golf Center when aircraft weren't using the runway. There were gates alongside the 12th and 18th holes, which would lower and lock after the airport control tower rang a bell notifying that a plane was either taking off or landing. In 1995, the runway was again expanded to 2,003 meters and 31 meters wide, allowing larger commercial aircraft to operate from the airport. This included ATR aircraft and the Boeing 727 of American Eagle from San Juan, Puerto Rico, and American Airlines from Miami, operating as airlines with scheduled services to the airport.

=== Closure ===
By the 1990s, Punta Águila International Airport was unable to sufficiently cater the region's growing tourism and commercial demands, prompting the need for a replacement airport. In 1998, Central Romana Corporation, Ltd. began construction of the new La Romana International Airport. Through its subsidiary, Airport Management Services, Ltd., Central Romana Corporation, Ltd., inaugurated the new and modern airport on 14 December 2000, at a cost of over US$100 million, thus replacing Punta Águila International Airport. The airport was subsequently closed and demolished.
