= World2Fly =

Spanish airline

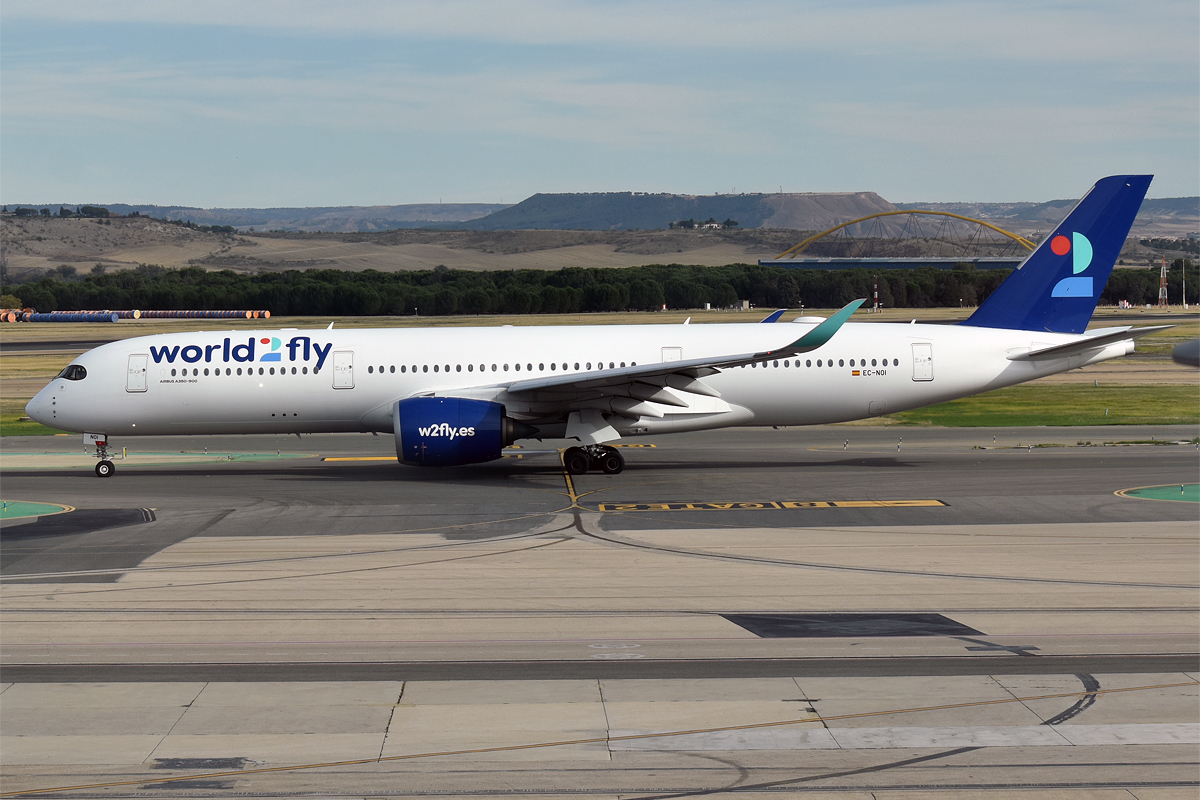
| IATA | ICAO | Call sign |
|---|---|---|
| 2W | WFL | BLUE WORLD |
- Founded: 2020; 6 years ago
- Commenced operations: 19 June 2021; 5 years ago
- AOC #: ES.AOC.157
- Hubs: Adolfo Suárez Madrid–Barajas Airport Lisbon Airport
- Subsidiaries: World2Fly Portugal
- Fleet size: 6
- Destinations: 14
- Parent company: Iberostar Group
- Headquarters: Palma de Mallorca, Balearic Islands, Spain
- Key people: Gabriel Subías (CEO)
- Website: www.w2fly.es

World2Fly is a Spanish charter/ACMI airline that operates out of Adolfo Suarez-Madrid Barajas Airport in Madrid, Spain, and Humberto Delgado Airport in Lisbon, Portugal.

== History ==
World2Fly was established during 2021, after receiving the first leased Airbus A350-900. Based out of Palma de Mallorca, the airline concentrates on flights to long haul destinations in the Caribbean and is owned by the Iberostar Group of hotels, a company whose previous holdings included another airline, Iberworld. World2Fly’s destinations include Punta Cana, Cancun, and La Habana.

== Destinations ==
As of 2026, World2Fly currently operates scheduled and seasonal charter flights to Caribbean, Africa, Europe and South America.

| Country | City | Airport | Notes | Refs |
|---|---|---|---|---|
| Argentina | Rosario | Rosario – Islas Malvinas International Airport | Begins 1 October 2026 | |
| Colombia | Cali | Alfonso Bonilla Aragón International Airport | | |
| Colombia | Cartagena de Indias | Rafael Núñez International Airport | | |
| Cuba | Havana | José Martí International Airport | Terminated | |
| Czech Republic | Prague | Václav Havel Airport Prague | Seasonal Charter | |
| Dominican Republic | Punta Cana | Punta Cana International Airport | | |
| Dominican Republic | La Romana | La Romana International Airport | | |
| Dominican Republic | Santo Domingo | Las Américas International Airport | | |
| Mauritius | Plaine Magnien | Sir Seewoosagur Ramgoolam International Airport | Seasonal | |
| Mexico | Cancún | Cancún International Airport | | |
| Slovakia | Bratislava | Bratislava Airport | Seasonal Charter | |
| Spain | Madrid | Adolfo Suárez Madrid–Barajas Airport | Hub | |
| Tanzania | Zanzibar City | Abeid Amani Karume International Airport | Seasonal Charter | |
| Turkey | Istanbul | Istanbul Airport | Seasonal Charter | |
| United States | Orlando | Orlando Sanford International Airport | Terminated | |
| Uzbekistan | Tashkent | Tashkent International Airport | Seasonal Charter | |
| Uzbekistan | Urgench | Urgench International Airport | | |

== Fleet ==
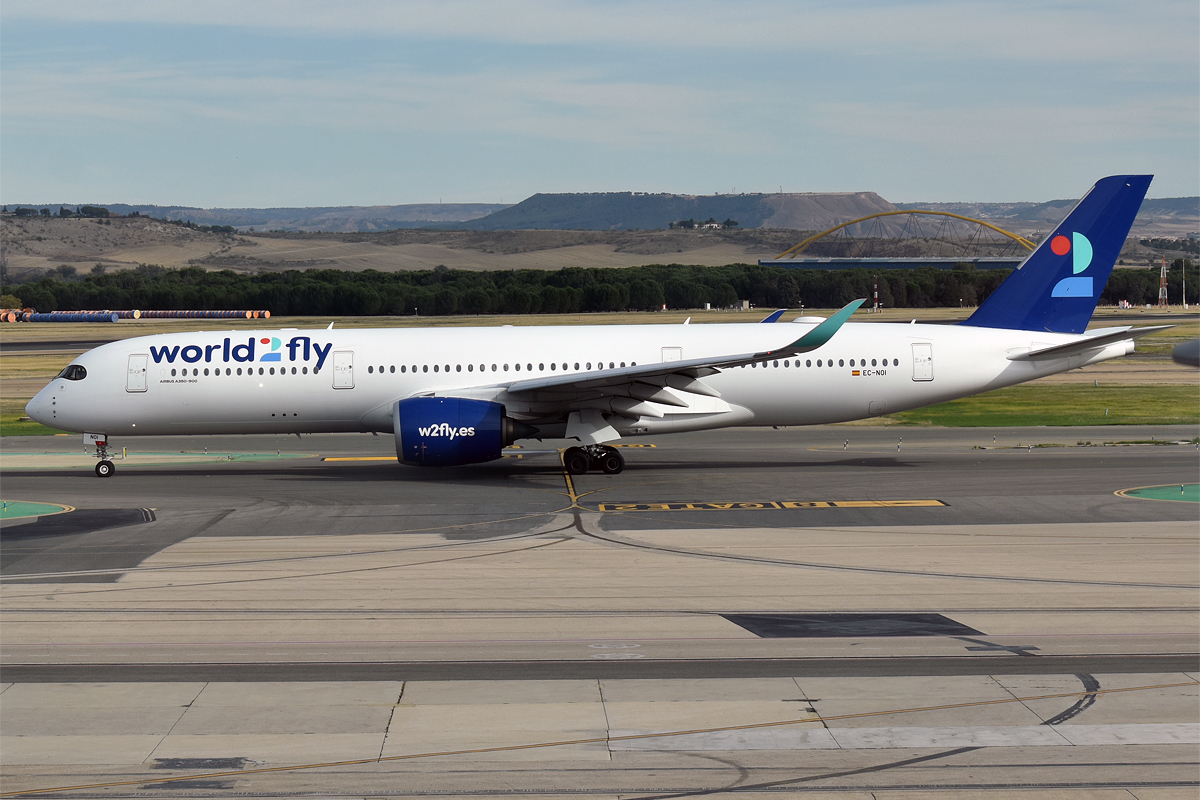
World2Fly Airbus A350-900

=== Current fleet ===
As of August 2025, World2Fly operates the following aircraft:

World2Fly fleet
| Aircraft | In service | Orders | Passengers | Notes |
|---|---|---|---|---|
| Airbus A330-300 | 3 | — | 388 | 1 operated by World2Fly Portugal. To be retired and replaced by Airbus A350-900. |
| Airbus A350-900 | 3 | — | 432 | One leased to Corendon Dutch Airlines. Replacing Airbus A330-300. One aircraft originally meant for Aeroflot. |
| Total | 6 | — | | |

=== Historic fleet ===
World2Fly had the following airplanes:

Historic fleet of World2Fly
| Airplane | Total | Introduced | Retired | Registration | Notas |
|---|---|---|---|---|---|
| Airbus A330-300 | 1 | 2021 | 2021 | EC-LXR | Transferred to World2Fly Portugal. |

== See also ==
- List of airlines of Spain
