= Samaná El Catey International Airport =

Dominican airport

Profesor Juan Bosch International Airport Aeropuerto Internacional El Catey Presidente Juan Bosch
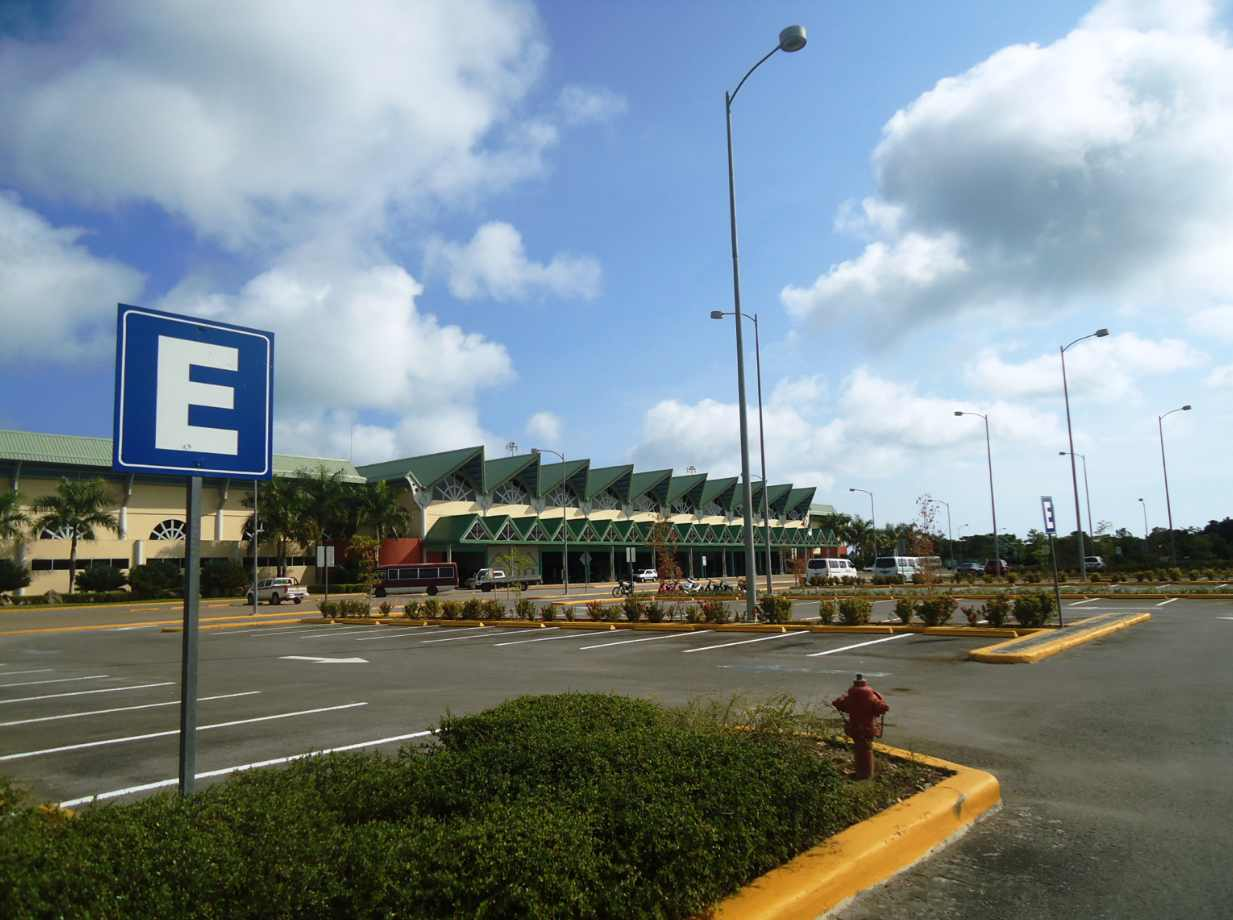
- IATA: AZS; ICAO: MDCY

Summary
- Airport type: Public
- Operator: Aerodom
- Serves: Samaná
- Location: El Catey, Samaná Province, Dominican Republic
- Elevation AMSL: 12 ft (3.7 m)
- Coordinates: 19°16′12″N 069°44′15″W
- Website: Aeropuerto El Catey

Map
- Location of airport in Dominican Republic

Runways
Direction	Length		Surface
Direction	ft	m	Surface
07/25	9,843	3,000	Asphalt

Statistics (2024)
- Passengers: 101,555
- Aircraft Operations: 852
- Source: Departamento Aeroportuario

Samaná El Catey International Airport (IATA: AZS, ICAO: MDCY), also called Aeropuerto Internacional Presidente Juan Bosch (AISA), is an international airport that opened on 6 November 2006, serving the province of Samaná in the Dominican Republic. The airport is located near the village of El Catey, some 8 km (5.0 mi) west of Sánchez, at the base of the mountainous peninsula Cape Samaná. From the airport, it is a 30-minute drive to Las Terrenas, a 40-minute drive to the provincial capital, Santa Bárbara de Samaná, and an approximately one-hour drive to Las Galeras. With over 122,000 passengers in 2023, it's the Dominican Republic's sixth busiest airport.

== Facilities ==
The airport's new runway is 3000 m × 45 m, flexible pavement load-rated PCN 66 F/A/W/T, designed to accommodate a Boeing 747. The terminal can accommodate 4 Boeing 747 aircraft simultaneously, albeit with a peak flow of 600 passengers per hour.

== Airlines and destinations ==
The following airlines operate regular scheduled and charter flights at Samaná El Catey Airport:

Airlines	Destinations
Air Canada	Seasonal: Montréal–Trudeau
Air Canada Rouge	Seasonal: Montreal–Trudeau, Toronto–Pearson
Air Caraïbes	Paris–Orly
Air Transat	Montréal–Trudeau, Toronto–Pearson; Seasonal: Québec City
WestJet	Montréal-Trudeau, Toronto–Pearson

== Statistics ==
Busiest International Routes from AZS (2024)
Rank	City	Passengers	Carriers
1	(Canada) Montréal-Trudeau	62,278	Air Canada Rouge, Air Transat
2	(Canada) Toronto-Pearson	26,213	Air Canada Rouge, Air Transat, WestJet
3	(Portugal) Portela	7,097	
4	(Canada) Quebec	5,442	

== See also ==
- List of the busiest airports in Dominican Republic
- List of the busiest airports in the Caribbean
