= List of the busiest airports in Dominican Republic =

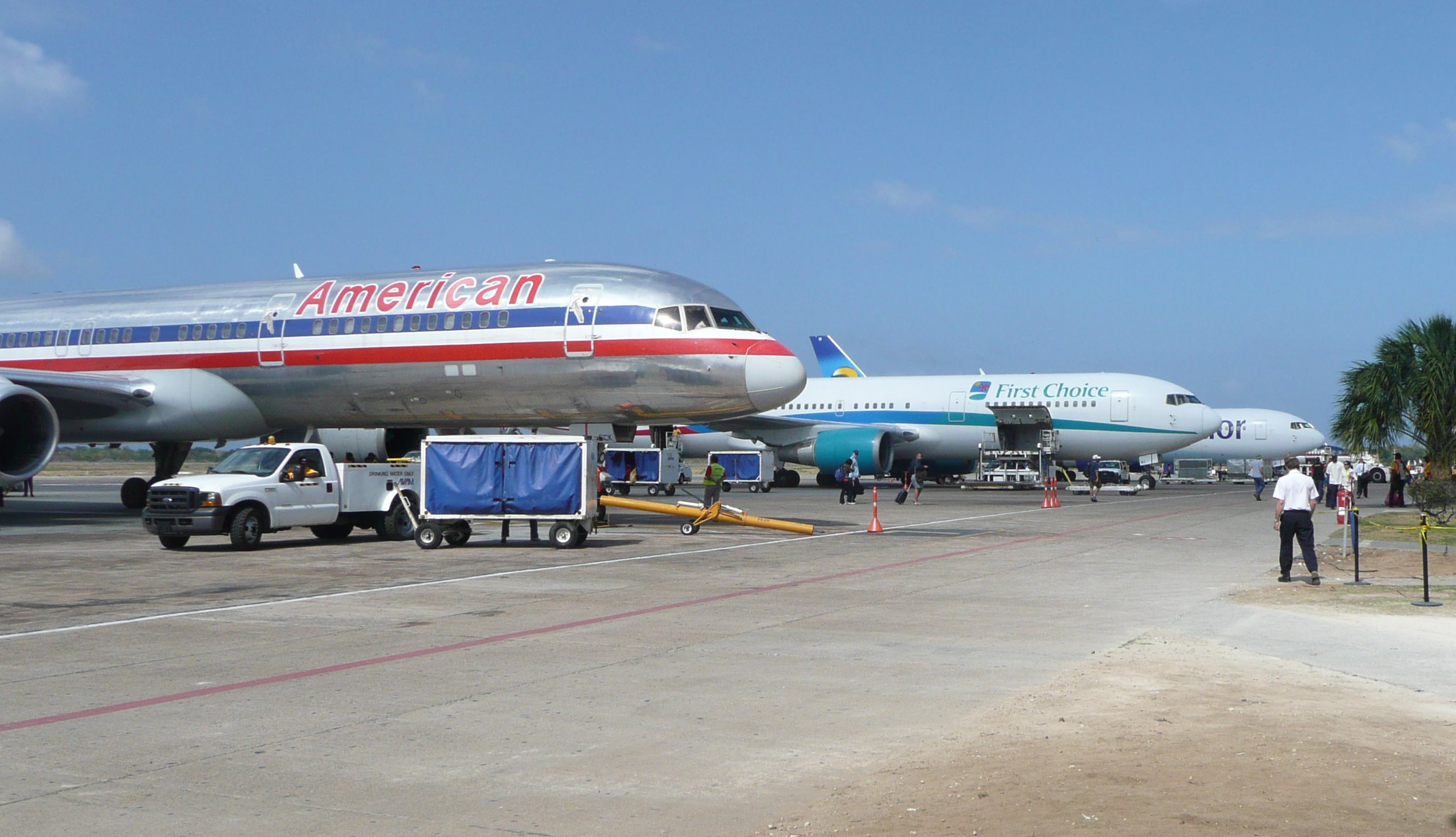
Punta Cana International Airport is currently the country's busiest airport by passenger traffic.

This is a list of the busiest airports in the Dominican Republic by passenger traffic, a statistic available for almost all the airstrips taken into account. The present list intends to include all the international airports located in the country.

== List of airports ==
Ordered by total passenger traffic, international and domestic, with final data for 2019.

== 2025 ==
	Airport name	IATA/ICAO code	City served	Passengers (2025)	Change
1.	Punta Cana International Airport	PUJ/MDPC	Punta Cana	10,689,693	▲11.91%
2.	Las Américas International Airport	SDQ/MDSD	Santo Domingo	5,221,168	▼4.66%
3.	Cibao International Airport	STI/MDST	Santiago de los Caballeros	2,285,035	▼0.28%
4.	Gregorio Luperón International Airport	POP/MDPP	Puerto Plata	814,076	▼7.50%
5.	La Romana International Airport	LRM/MDLR	La Romana	235,026	▲41.31%
6.	Samaná El Catey International Airport	AZS/MDCY	Samaná	97,665	▼8.00%
7.	La Isabela International Airport	JBQ/MDJB	Santo Domingo	56,588	▼15.19%

== 2024 ==
	Airport name	IATA/ICAO code	City served	Passengers (2024)	Change
1.	Punta Cana International Airport	PUJ/MDPC	Punta Cana	9,551,291	▲2.30%
2.	Las Américas International Airport	SDQ/MDSD	Santo Domingo	5,476,547	▼0.25%
3.	Cibao International Airport	STI/MDST	Santiago de los Caballeros	2,291,599	▲9.08%
4.	Gregorio Luperón International Airport	POP/MDPP	Puerto Plata	880,091	▲20.25%
5.	La Romana International Airport	LRM/MDLR	La Romana	166,316	▼3.48%
6.	Samaná El Catey International Airport	AZS/MDCY	Samaná	106,167	▼16.25%
7.	La Isabela International Airport	JBQ/MDJB	Santo Domingo	66,731	▼41.27%

== 2023 ==
	Airport name	IATA/ICAO code	City served	Passengers (2023)	Change
1.	Punta Cana International Airport	PUJ/MDPC	Punta Cana	9,336,502	▲11.58%
2.	Las Américas International Airport	SDQ/MDSD	Santo Domingo	5,490,334	▲17.43%
3.	Cibao International Airport	STI/MDST	Santiago de los Caballeros	2,100,729	▲12.50%
4.	Gregorio Luperón International Airport	POP/MDPP	Puerto Plata	731,876	▲13.45%
5.	La Romana International Airport	LRM/MDLR	La Romana	172,325	▼29.65%
6.	Samaná El Catey International Airport	AZS/MDCY	Samaná	126,775	▲100.92%
7.	La Isabela International Airport	JBQ/MDJB	Santo Domingo	113,633	▲9.36%

== 2022 ==
	Airport name	IATA/ICAO code	City served	Passengers (2022)	Change
1.	Punta Cana International Airport	PUJ/MDPC	Punta Cana	8,366,844	▲89.68%
2.	Las Américas International Airport	SDQ/MDSD	Santo Domingo	4,675,375	▲19.80%
3.	Cibao International Airport	STI/MDST	Santiago de los Caballeros	1,867,236	▼4.01%
4.	Gregorio Luperón International Airport	POP/MDPP	Puerto Plata	645,064	▲66.69%
5.	La Romana International Airport	LRM/MDLR	La Romana	244,960	▼31.16%
6.	La Isabela International Airport	JBQ/MDJB	Santo Domingo	103,901	▲17.13%
7.	Samaná El Catey International Airport	AZS/MDCY	Samaná	63,095	▲153.37%

== 2021 ==
	Airport name	IATA/ICAO code	City served	Passengers (2021)	Change
1.	Punta Cana International Airport	PUJ/MDPC	Punta Cana	4,410,838	▲117.60%
2.	Las Américas International Airport	SDQ/MDSD	Santo Domingo	3,902,553	▲112.53%
3.	Cibao International Airport	STI/MDST	Santiago de los Caballeros	1,945,241	▲101.44%
4.	Gregorio Luperón International Airport	POP/MDPP	Puerto Plata	386,973	▲11.43%
5.	La Romana International Airport	LRM/MDLR	La Romana	355,874	▲134.95%
6.	La Isabela International Airport	JBQ/MDJB	Santo Domingo	88,700	▲99.45%
7.	Samaná El Catey International Airport	AZS/MDCY	Samaná	24,902	▼55.14%

Source: Banco Central República Dominicana year 2021

== 2020 ==
	Airport name	IATA/ICAO code	City served	Passengers (2019)	Change
1.	Punta Cana International Airport	PUJ/MDPC	Punta Cana	2,027,016	▼71.6%
2.	Las Américas International Airport	SDQ/MDSD	Santo Domingo	1,836,151	▼53.9%
3.	Cibao International Airport	STI/MDST	Santiago de los Caballeros	965,628	▼43.8%
4.	Gregorio Luperón International Airport	POP/MDPP	Puerto Plata	347,263	▼58.7%
5.	La Romana International Airport	LRM/MDLR	La Romana	151,466	▼62.1%
6.	La Isabela International Airport	JBQ/MDJB	Santo Domingo	75,655	▼41.2%
7.	Samaná El Catey International Airport	AZS/MDCY	Samaná	55,519	▼66.5%

Source: Banco Central República Dominicana year 2020

== Other years ==
Ordered by total passenger traffic, international and domestic, with final data for years between 2005 and 2019.

=== 2019 ===
	Airport name	IATA/ICAO code	City served	Passengers (2019)	Change
1.	Punta Cana International Airport	PUJ/MDPC	Punta Cana	7,137,882	▼9.49%
2.	Las Américas International Airport	SDQ/MDSD	Santo Domingo	3,982,978	▲7.63%
3.	Cibao International Airport	STI/MDST	Santiago de los Caballeros	1,717,611	▲6.51%
4.	Gregorio Luperón International Airport	POP/MDPP	Puerto Plata	839,962	▼4.1%
5.	La Romana International Airport	LRM/MDLR	La Romana	399,416	▲93.2%
6.	Samaná El Catey International Airport	AZS/MDCY	Samaná	165,780	▼3.97%
7.	La Isabela International Airport	JBQ/MDJB	Santo Domingo	75,655	▲48.8%

Source: Banco Central República Dominicana year 2019

=== 2018 ===
	Airport name	IATA/ICAO code	City served	Passengers (2018)	Change
1.	Punta Cana International Airport	PUJ/MDPC	Punta Cana	7,886,586	▲7.6%
2.	Las Américas International Airport	SDQ/MDSD	Santo Domingo	3,700,582	▲0.4%
3.	Cibao International Airport	STI/MDST	Santiago de los Caballeros	1,612,523	▲15%
4.	Gregorio Luperón International Airport	POP/MDPP	Puerto Plata	875,941	▼9.4%
5.	La Romana International Airport	LRM/MDLR	La Romana	206,732	▼1.9%
6.	Samaná El Catey International Airport	AZS/MDCY	Samaná	172,641	▲25%
7.	La Isabela International Airport	JBQ/MDJB	Santo Domingo	50,838	▲61.9%

Source: Banco Central República Dominicana year 2018

=== 2017 ===
	Airport name	IATA/ICAO code	City served	Passengers (2017)	Change
1.	Punta Cana International Airport	PUJ/MDPC	Punta Cana	7,331,415	▲6.33%
2.	Las Américas International Airport	SDQ/MDSD	Santo Domingo	3,687,024	▲0.35%
3.	Cibao International Airport	STI/MDST	Santiago de los Caballeros	1,400,551	▲0.2%
4.	Gregorio Luperón International Airport	POP/MDPP	Puerto Plata	966,985	▲11.6%
5.	La Romana International Airport	LRM/MDLR	La Romana	210,669	▼1.84%
6.	Samaná El Catey International Airport	AZS/MDCY	Samaná	138,055	▲8.2%
7.	La Isabela International Airport	JBQ/MDJB	Santo Domingo	31,405	▲33.6%

Source: Banco Central República Dominicana year 2017

=== 2016 ===
	Airport name	IATA/ICAO code	City served	Passengers (2016)	Change
1.	Punta Cana International Airport	PUJ/MDPC	Punta Cana	6,894,892	▲8.29%
2.	Las Américas International Airport	SDQ/MDSD	Santo Domingo	3,673,957	▲3.86%
3.	Cibao International Airport	STI/MDST	Santiago de los Caballeros	1,397,734	▲5.92%
4.	Gregorio Luperón International Airport	POP/MDPP	Puerto Plata	866,647	▲11.7%
5.	La Romana International Airport	LRM/MDLR	La Romana	214,620	▲2.81%
6.	Samaná El Catey International Airport	AZS/MDCY	Samaná	127,626	▲4.67%
7.	La Isabela International Airport	JBQ/MDJB	Santo Domingo	23,502	▼34.2%

Source: Banco Central República Dominicana year 2016

=== 2015 ===
	Airport name	IATA/ICAO code	City served	Passengers (2015)	Change
1.	Punta Cana International Airport	PUJ/MDPC	Punta Cana	6,366,552	▲9.27%
2.	Las Américas International Airport	SDQ/MDSD	Santo Domingo	3,537,306	▲11.80%
3.	Cibao International Airport	STI/MDST	Santiago de los Caballeros	1,319,490	▲7.56%
4.	Gregorio Luperón International Airport	POP/MDPP	Puerto Plata	776,149	▲1.01%
5.	La Romana International Airport	LRM/MDLR	La Romana	208,749	▼9.74%
6.	Samaná El Catey International Airport	AZS/MDCY	Samaná	121,922	▲5.79%
7.	La Isabela International Airport	JBQ/MDJB	Santo Domingo	35,719	-

Source: Banco Central República Dominicana year 2015

=== 2014 ===
	Airport name	IATA/ICAO code	City served	Passengers (2014)
1.	Punta Cana International Airport	PUJ/MDPC	Punta Cana	5,826,081 ▲12.49%
2.	Las Américas International Airport	SDQ/MDSD	Santo Domingo	3,163,746 ▲3.99%
3.	Cibao International Airport	STI/MDST	Santiago de los Caballeros	1,226,646 ▲12.31%
4.	Gregorio Luperón International Airport	POP/MDPP	Puerto Plata	761,937 ▲2.02%
5.	La Romana International Airport	LRM/MDLR	La Romana	231,256 ▲18.11%
6.	Samaná El Catey International Airport	AZS/MDCY	Samaná	115,247 ▼3.6%

Source: Banco Central República Dominicana year 2014

=== 2013 ===
	Airport name	IATA/ICAO code	City served	Passengers (2013)
1.	Punta Cana International Airport	PUJ/MDPC	Punta Cana	5,178,979 ▲7.49%
2.	Las Américas International Airport	SDQ/MDSD	Santo Domingo	3,016,109 ▼3.83%
3.	Cibao International Airport	STI/MDST	Santiago de los Caballeros	1,092,229 ▼0.03%
4.	Gregorio Luperón International Airport	POP/MDPP	Puerto Plata	746,821 ▲0.27%
5.	La Romana International Airport	LRM/MDLR	La Romana	195,792 ▼13.2%
6.	Samaná El Catey International Airport	AZS/MDCY	Samaná	119,502 ▲6.5%

Source: Banco Central República Dominicana year 2013

=== 2012 ===
	Airport name	IATA/ICAO code	City served	Passengers (2012)
1.	Punta Cana International Airport	PUJ/MDPC	Punta Cana	4,817,774 ▲8%
2.	Las Américas International Airport	SDQ/MDSD	Santo Domingo	3,136,522 ▲2%
3.	Cibao International Airport	STI/MDST	Santiago de los Caballeros	1,092,663 ▲17.6%
4.	Gregorio Luperón International Airport	POP/MDPP	Puerto Plata	744,754 ▼1.5%
5.	La Romana International Airport	LRM/MDLR	La Romana	225,550 ▼7.6%
6.	Samaná El Catey International Airport	AZS/MDCY	Samaná	112,164 ▼7.8%

Source: Banco Central República Dominicana year 2012

=== 2011 ===
	Airport name	IATA/ICAO code	City served	Passengers (2011)
1.	Punta Cana International Airport	PUJ/MDPC	Punta Cana	4,460,583 ▲10.6%
2.	Las Américas International Airport	SDQ/MDSD	Santo Domingo	3,074,445 ▲1%
3.	Cibao International Airport	STI/MDST	Santiago de los Caballeros	928,944 ▲3.1%
4.	Gregorio Luperón International Airport	POP/MDPP	Puerto Plata	755,877 ▼14.6%
5.	La Romana International Airport	LRM/MDLR	La Romana	244,081 ▼7.9%
6.	Samaná El Catey International Airport	AZS/MDCY	Samaná	121,718 ▼0.4%

Source: Banco Central República Dominicana year 2011

=== 2010 ===
	Airport name	IATA/ICAO code	City served	Passengers (2010)
1.	Punta Cana International Airport	PUJ/MDPC	Punta Cana	4,033,391 ▲5.5%
2.	Las Américas International Airport	SDQ/MDSD	Santo Domingo	3,044,302 ▲9.4%
3.	Cibao International Airport	STI/MDST	Santiago de los Caballeros	901,080 ▲10.2%
4.	Gregorio Luperón International Airport	POP/MDPP	Puerto Plata	885,306 ▼17.9%
5.	La Romana International Airport	LRM/MDLR	La Romana	264,947 ▼11.8%
6.	Samaná El Catey International Airport	AZS/MDCY	Samaná	122,229 ▲16.5%

Source: Banco Central República Dominicana year 2010

=== 2009 ===
	Airport name	IATA/ICAO code	City served	Passengers (2009)
1.	Punta Cana International Airport	PUJ/MDPC	Punta Cana	3,811,946 ▲2.8%
2.	Las Américas International Airport	SDQ/MDSD	Santo Domingo	2,756,716 ▲5.2%
3.	Gregorio Luperón International Airport	POP/MDPP	Puerto Plata	1,038,698 ▼8.1%
4.	Cibao International Airport	STI/MDST	Santiago de los Caballeros	817,518 ▼0.3%
5.	La Romana International Airport	LRM/MDLR	La Romana	296,124 ▼31.5%
6.	Samaná El Catey International Airport	AZS/MDCY	Samaná	102,004 ▼20.3%

Source: Banco Central República Dominicana year 2009

=== 2008 ===
	Airport name	IATA/ICAO code	City served	Passengers (2008)
1.	Punta Cana International Airport	PUJ/MDPC	Punta Cana	3,702,826 ▲3.7%
2.	Las Américas International Airport	SDQ/MDSD	Santo Domingo	2,614,072 ▼2.1%
3.	Gregorio Luperón International Airport	POP/MDPP	Puerto Plata	1,123,075 ▲1.8%
4.	Cibao International Airport	STI/MDST	Santiago de los Caballeros	820,159 ▼17.2%
5.	La Romana International Airport	LRM/MDLR	La Romana	389,321 ▼10.6%
6.	Samaná El Catey International Airport	AZS/MDCY	Samaná	122,774 ▲3.5%

Source: Banco Central República Dominicana year 2008

=== 2007 ===
	Airport name	IATA/ICAO code	City served	Passengers (2007)
1.	Punta Cana International Airport	PUJ/MDPC	Punta Cana	3,566,938 ▲3.3%
2.	Las Américas International Airport	SDQ/MDSD	Santo Domingo	2,670,098 ▲2.6%
3.	Gregorio Luperón International Airport	POP/MDPP	Puerto Plata	1,102,852 ▼9.3%
4.	Cibao International Airport	STI/MDST	Santiago de los Caballeros	950,136 ▼2.5%
5.	La Romana International Airport	LRM/MDLR	La Romana	430,432 ▼14.2%
6.	Samaná El Catey International Airport	AZS/MDCY	Samaná	118,449 First Year

Source: Banco Central República Dominicana year 2007

=== 2006 ===
	Airport name	IATA/ICAO code	City served	Passengers (2006)
1.	Punta Cana International Airport	PUJ/MDPC	Punta Cana	3,488,534 ▲14.4%
2.	Las Américas International Airport	SDQ/MDSD	Santo Domingo	2,601,903 ▲1.5%
3.	Gregorio Luperón International Airport	POP/MDPP	Puerto Plata	1,205,793 ▲2.2%
4.	Cibao International Airport	STI/MDST	Santiago de los Caballeros	973,541 ▲8.1%
5.	La Romana International Airport	LRM/MDLR	La Romana	491,650 ▼3.7%

Source: Banco Central República Dominicana year 2006

=== 2005 ===
	Airport name	IATA/ICAO code	City served	Passengers (2005)
1.	Punta Cana International Airport	PUJ/MDPC	Punta Cana	2,947,106
2.	Las Américas International Airport	SDQ/MDSD	Santo Domingo	2,563,714
3.	Gregorio Luperón International Airport	POP/MDPP	Puerto Plata	1,179,478
4.	Cibao International Airport	STI/MDST	Santiago de los Caballeros	900,252
5.	La Romana International Airport	LRM/MDLR	La Romana	509,713

Source: Banco Central República Dominicana year 2005
