= La Romana International Airport =

La Romana Casa De Campo International Airport Aeropuerto Internacional La Romana Casa De Campo
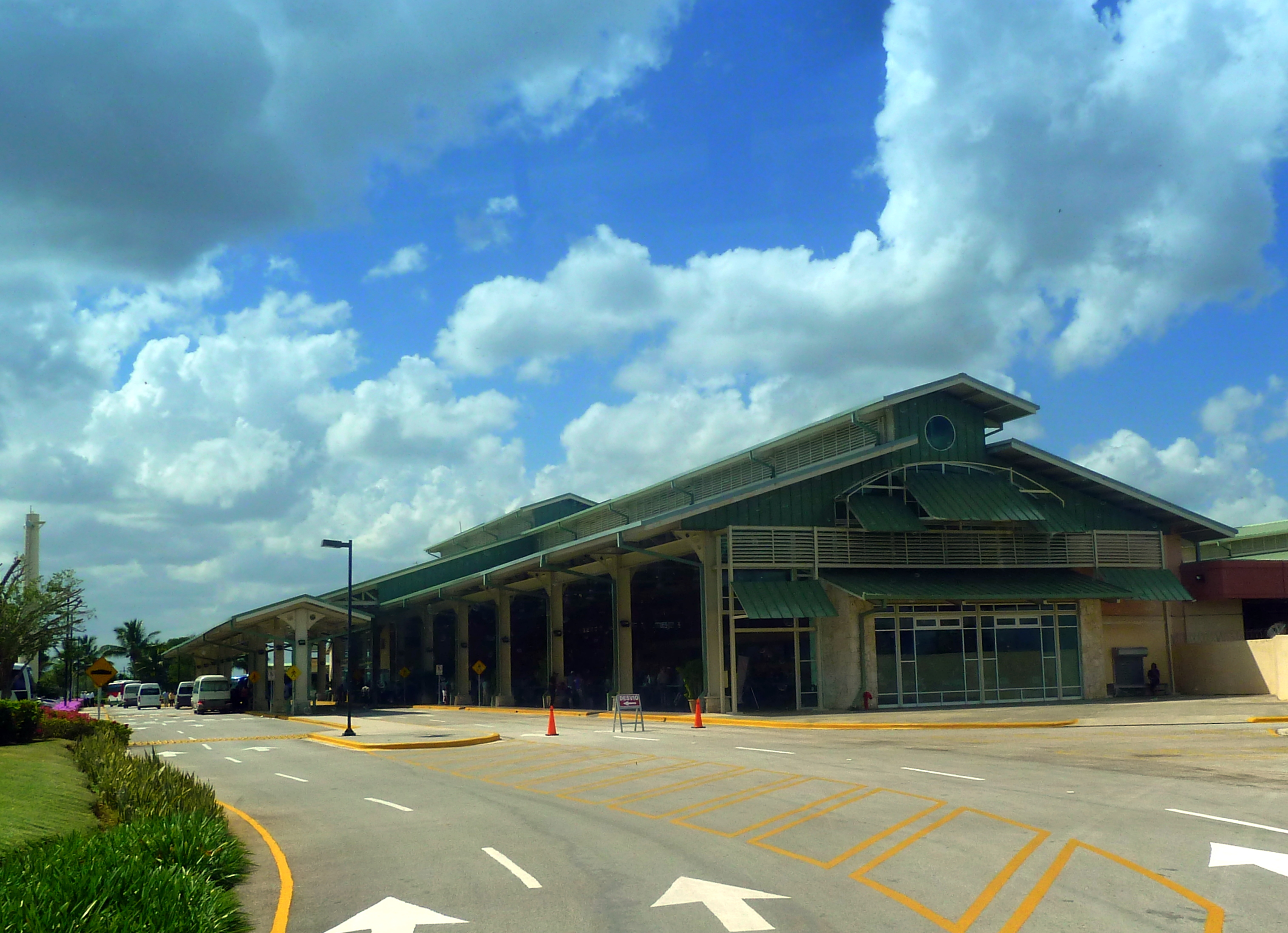
- IATA: LRM; ICAO: MDLR

Summary
- Airport type: Public
- Owner: City of La Romana
- Operator: Central Romana Corporation
- Serves: La Romana, Dominican Republic
- Location: La Romana
- Elevation AMSL: 213 ft (65 m)
- Coordinates: 18°27′08″N 68°54′40″W

Map
- Location of airport in Dominican Republic

Runways
Direction	Length		Surface
Direction	m	ft	Surface
11/29	2,950	9,678	Concrete

Statistics (2024)
- Passengers: 142,807
- Aircraft operations: 3,184
- Source: GCM, Google Maps, SkyVector

La Romana Casa De Campo International Airport (IATA: LRM, ICAO: MDLR) is an international airport located on the southeastern coast of the Dominican Republic, adjacent to the tourist town of La Romana and the Casa de Campo resort. It is located about 68 miles (109 km) from the capital, Santo Domingo, approximately 1 hour and 34 minutes by car. With 146,000 passengers as of 2023, it is the Dominican Republic's fifth busiest airport.

== Overview ==
The current single terminal is built in the style of an old sugar mill. The airport consists of a main terminal with four modern gates. It has facilities for passengers and for the maintenance of aircraft. This airport receives most of the private flights in the country, principally businessmen that come to La Romana for vacations in Casa de Campo. The La Romana VOR/DME (Ident: LRN) and the La Romana non-directional beacon (Ident: LRN) are located on the field.

== History ==
Before La Romana International Airport, the earlier Punta Águila International Airport served the region and was located on the Caribbean shore, 5 kilometres (3.1 mi) southwest of the current airport. By the 1990s, the airport was unable to sufficiently cater the region's growing tourism and commercial demands, prompting the need for a replacement airport. In 1998, Central Romana Corporation, Ltd. began construction of the new La Romana International Airport. Through its subsidiary, Airport Management Services, Ltd., Central Romana Corporation, Ltd., inaugurated the new and modern airport on 14 December 2000, at a cost of over US$100 million, thus replacing Punta Águila International Airport. The airport was subsequently closed and demolished.

== Airlines and destinations ==
The following airlines operate regular scheduled and charter flights to and from La Romana Airport:

Airlines	Destinations
Air Canada	Seasonal: Montréal–Trudeau
Air Transat	Seasonal: Montréal–Trudeau
American Airlines	Miami
Condor	Düsseldorf, Frankfurt
Neos	Milan–Malpensa, Rome–Fiumicino, Verona
RED Air	Miami
TUI Airways	Seasonal charter: Birmingham, London–Gatwick, Manchester
Westjet	Seasonal: Montréal–Trudeau
World2Fly	Seasonal charter: Madrid, Lisbon

== Statistics ==
Busiest international routes from LRM (2024)
Rank	City	Passengers	Carriers
1	Milan-Malpensa	42,838	Neos
2	Rome-Fiumicino	33,680	Neos
3	Montego Bay	14,378	
4	Montreal-Trudeau	11,946	Air Canada Rouge, Air Transant, Sunwing Airlines
5	Toronto-Pearson	9.228	Air Canada, Rouge, Sunwing Airlines
6	Portela	8,040	Orbest
7	Miami	7,605	American Airlines, RED Air
8	Verona-Villafranca	4,289	Neos
9	Maiquetia	2,992	
10	San Juan	2,885	

== Accidents and incidents ==
- 7 June 2026: A Gulfstream G200 crashed while landing following a mechanical issue; both pilots onboard died in the crash (no passengers were present).

== See also ==
- Transport in Dominican Republic
- List of airports in Dominican Republic
- List of the busiest airports in Dominican Republic
- List of the busiest airports in the Caribbean
