= Air Canada Rouge =

Low-cost airline of Canada

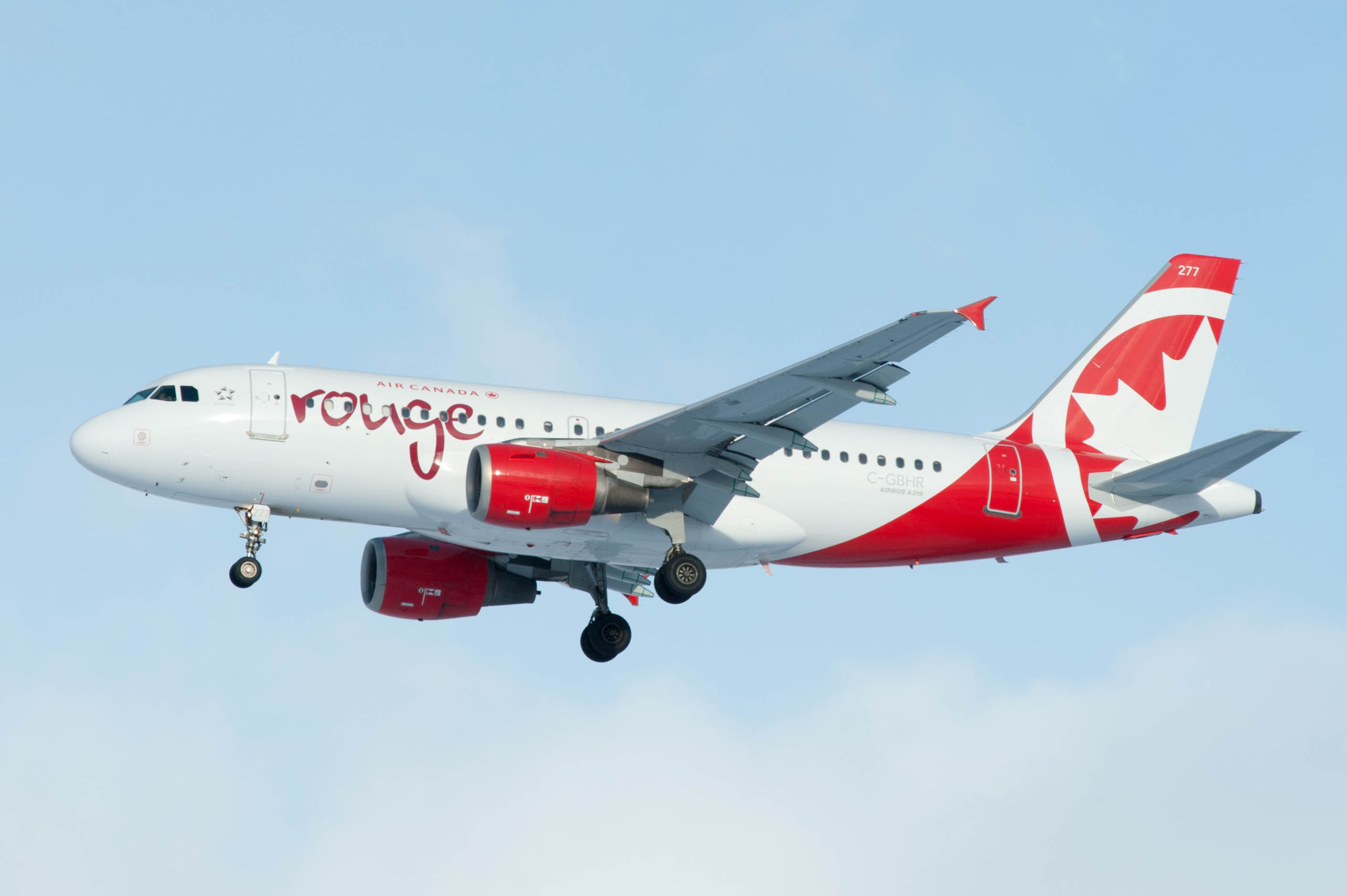
- Air Canada Rouge Airbus A319-100
IATA	ICAO	Call sign
RV	ROU	ROUGE
- Founded: December 2012; 13 years ago
- Commenced operations: July 1, 2013; 13 years ago
- AOC #: Canada: 17978; United States: 6CDF397F
- Hubs: Montréal–Trudeau; Toronto–Pearson; Vancouver
- Focus cities: Calgary (starting December 2026); Halifax; Ottawa
- Frequent-flyer program: Aeroplan
- Alliance: Star Alliance (affiliate)
- Fleet size: 38
- Destinations: 51
- Parent company: Air Canada
- Website: www.flyrouge.com

Air Canada Rouge (Rouge meaning 'red' in French) is a subsidiary of Air Canada focused on operating lower-cost flights for leisure travellers. It is fully integrated into the Air Canada mainline and Air Canada Express networks; flights are sold with AC flight numbers but are listed as "operated by Air Canada Rouge" (similar to regional flights operated under the Air Canada Express banner).

== History ==
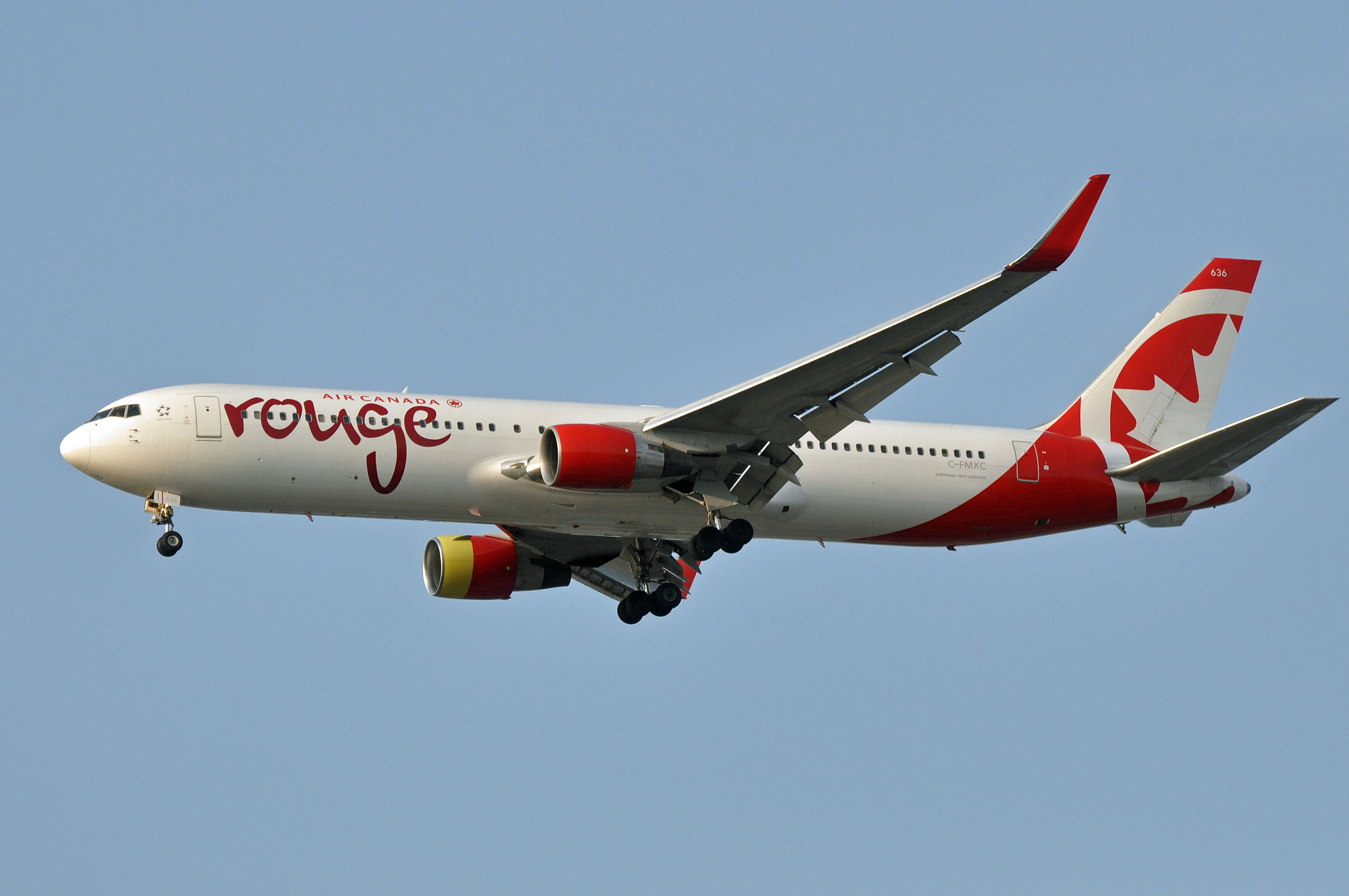
A former Air Canada Rouge Boeing 767-300ER which had been used mainly on services to Europe prior to the type's retirement in 2020

The airline was launched in December 2012 and began services on July 1, 2013. The first destination was Kingston, Jamaica, from Toronto, as part of the Air Canada Leisure Group to compete more efficiently with Air Transat, Sunwing, and WestJet in the leisure and vacation travel market, largely operating routes to Europe, the Caribbean, and the United States.

At the time of the launch, it had a fleet of four aircraft, two Airbus A319s and two Boeing 767s transferred from the parent company. Its fleet expanded to 28 aircraft within 18 months and was expected to reach 16 Boeing 767s, 20 Airbus A319s and five Airbus A321s by mid 2016. By early September 2016, the airline had expanded its Boeing 767 fleet to 19 aircraft.

On March 24, 2014, Air Canada announced plans for Air Canada Rouge to expand into Western Canada beginning in Spring 2014, to serve predominantly leisure markets from Vancouver and Calgary to Los Angeles, San Francisco, Las Vegas, Phoenix, Palm Springs, Honolulu, Maui and Anchorage. A seasonal service from Vancouver to Osaka/Kansai started in May 2015. In December 2015, new routes were announced including Toronto to Miami, Fort Myers, Charlottetown, and Deer Lake. Year-round routes include Toronto and Montreal to Fort Lauderdale; Montreal to Miami; Vancouver to San Diego and Mexico City; and Calgary to Phoenix.

In May 2020, amidst the COVID-19 pandemic, Air Canada announced the retirements of 79 aircraft among its mainline and Rouge fleets. This included Boeing 767, Embraer 190, and Airbus A319 aircraft. Air Canada Rouge was significantly affected, as the airline lost all 25 767s, and 2 A319s, leaving it with only 18 A320/A321, and 20 Airbus A319 aircraft in their fleet. This means the airline will no longer be able to reach some of its destinations in Europe, such as Budapest or Zagreb. Plans were in the works to continue to fly to some European destinations that are in range of these narrowbody aircraft. As of February 2021, the airline removed most of its Central and Eastern European destinations from their schedule, including Warsaw and Bucharest due to a lack of suitable aircraft.

Air Canada Rouge service was suspended from February 9, 2021 to September 7, 2021 to adhere to new travel rules by the government aimed at reducing non-essential travel.

On December 17, 2024, Air Canada announced that it would transfer its Boeing 737 MAX 8 aircraft to Rouge's fleet to replace the Airbus fleet, and it would create a Rouge hub at Vancouver International Airport. Air Canada Rouge's Airbus A320 and A321 fleet will transfer to the mainline fleet as part of the transition.

== Destinations ==
Air Canada Rouge serves leisure destinations in the Caribbean, Central America, Mexico predominantly, and the United States with all former routes to Asia, Europe, and South America being cancelled after the retirement of the Boeing 767-300ERs. With the new addition of the Boeing 737 MAX 8, Air Canada Rouge has started to serve many domestic routes.

== Fleet ==
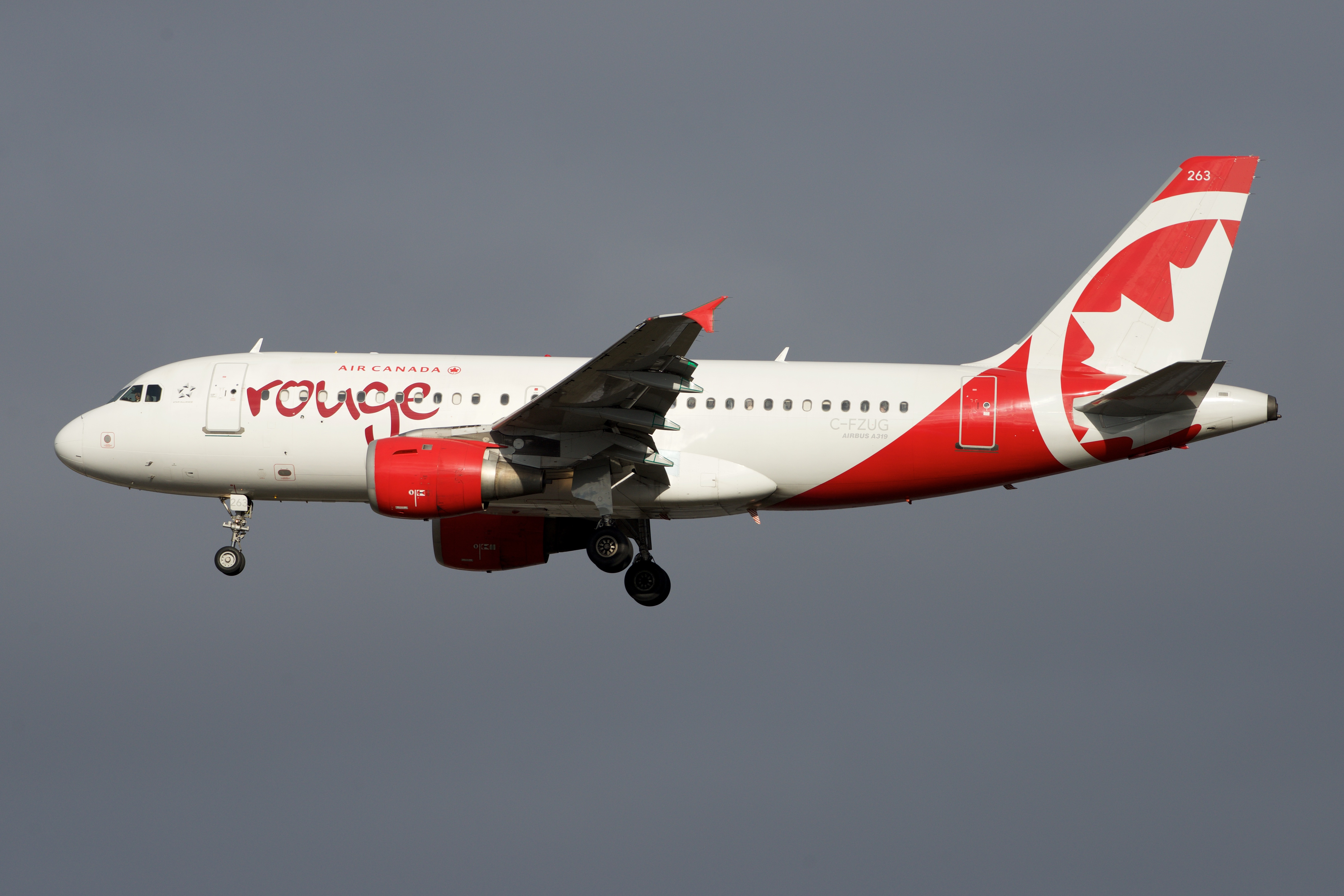
Airbus A319-100

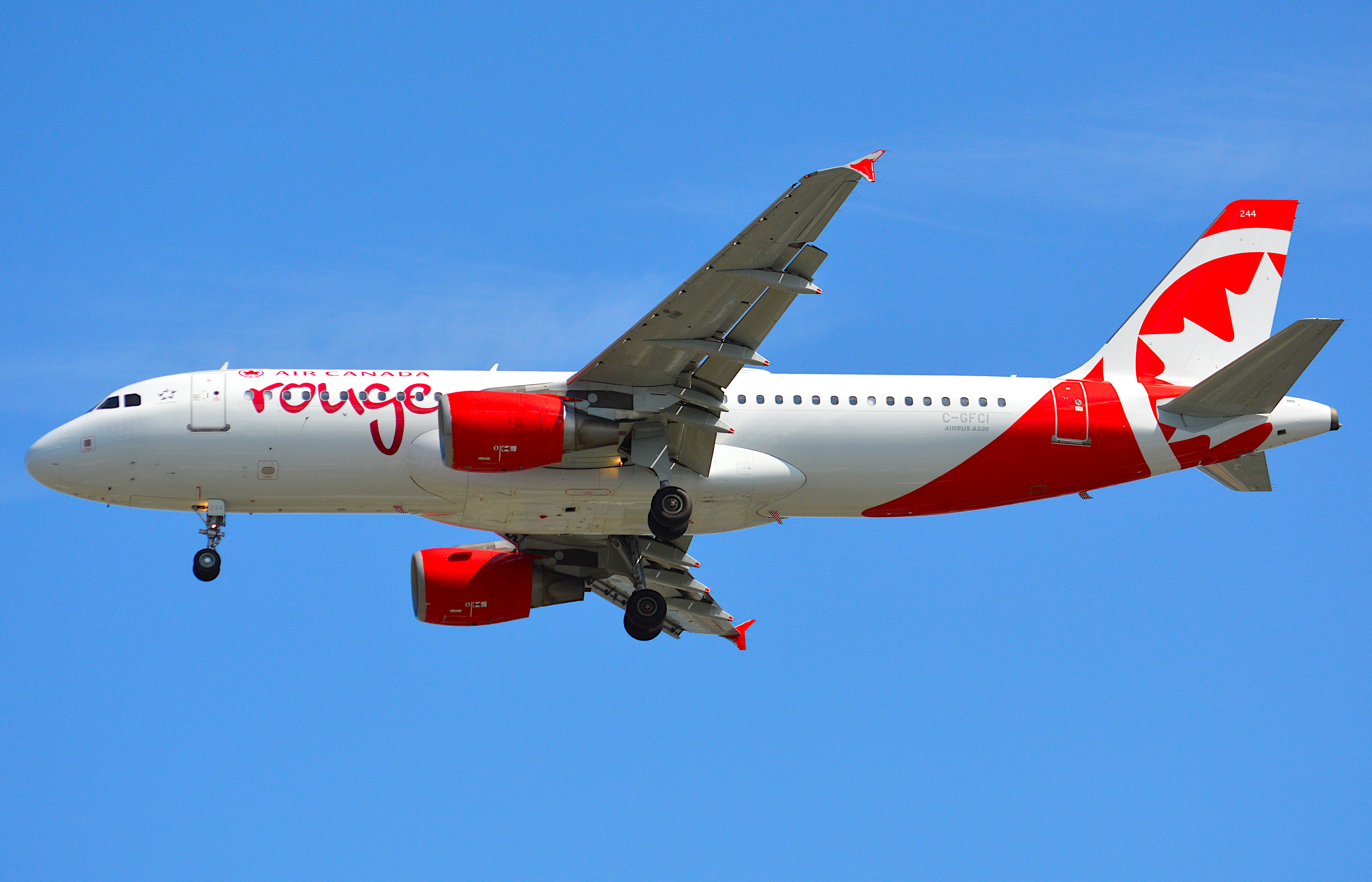
Airbus A320-200

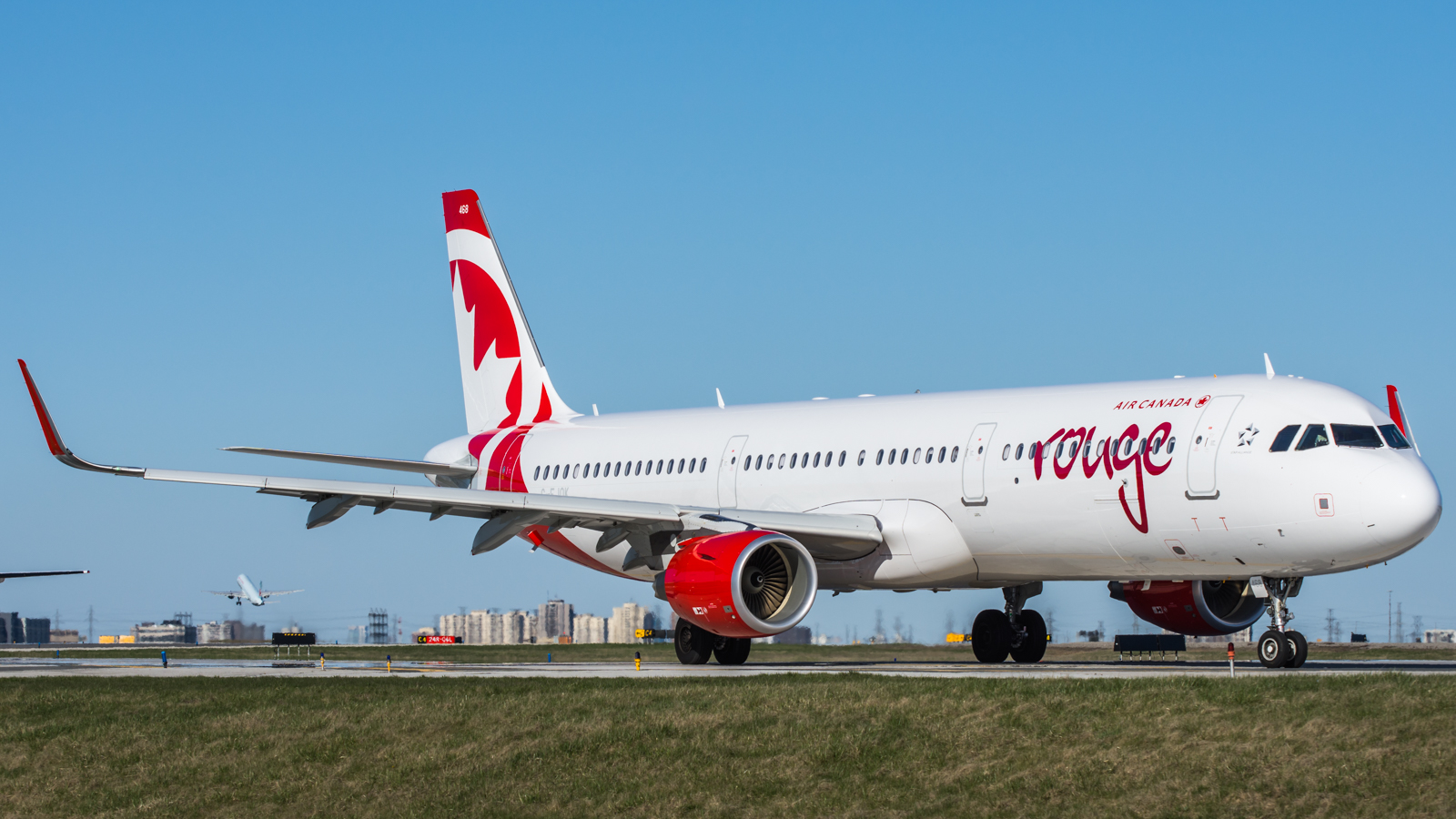
Airbus A321-200

=== Current fleet ===
As of August 2025, Air Canada Rouge operates the following aircraft:

Air Canada Rouge fleet
Aircraft	In service	Orders	Passengers			Notes
Aircraft	In service	Orders	J	Y	Total	Notes
Airbus A319-100	12	—	12	124	136	To be retired and replaced by Boeing 737 MAX 8.
Airbus A320-200	5	—	12	156	168	All to be transferred to Air Canada by 2027.
Airbus A321-200	13	—	12	184	196	All to be transferred to Air Canada by 2027.
Boeing 737 MAX 8	17	35	12	165	177	All to be transferred from Air Canada by 2028.
Total	47	45				

== Service concept ==
=== Seating ===
The Air Canada Rouge Airbus A319 has 16 more seats than a regular Air Canada Airbus A319 with 136 seats, the first four rows being for Rouge Plus and Premium Rouge passengers. The former Air Canada Rouge Boeing 767-300ER carried 71 more passengers than most regular Air Canada Boeing 767-300ER aircraft, with 282 seats. Of these 223 were economy, 35 Rouge Plus and 24 Premium Rouge. The 29-inch seat pitch on their A320 series aircraft is one of the smallest in North America, resulting in less leg room than on most other comparable aircraft. The Airbus A321-200 has 12 Premium Rouge seats and 184 Economy Class seats. The Premium Rouge seats have 37-inches of pitch while Economy Class seats have 30-inches of pitch.

=== On-board services ===
The baggage policy is the same as Air Canada's. On flights longer than two hours in duration, a full meal service is provided in Premium Rouge and a buy-on-board food offering in line with mainline service exists in Economy.
