= Punta Cana International Airport =

Airport in the Dominican Republic

Punta Cana International Airport Aeropuerto Internacional de Punta Cana

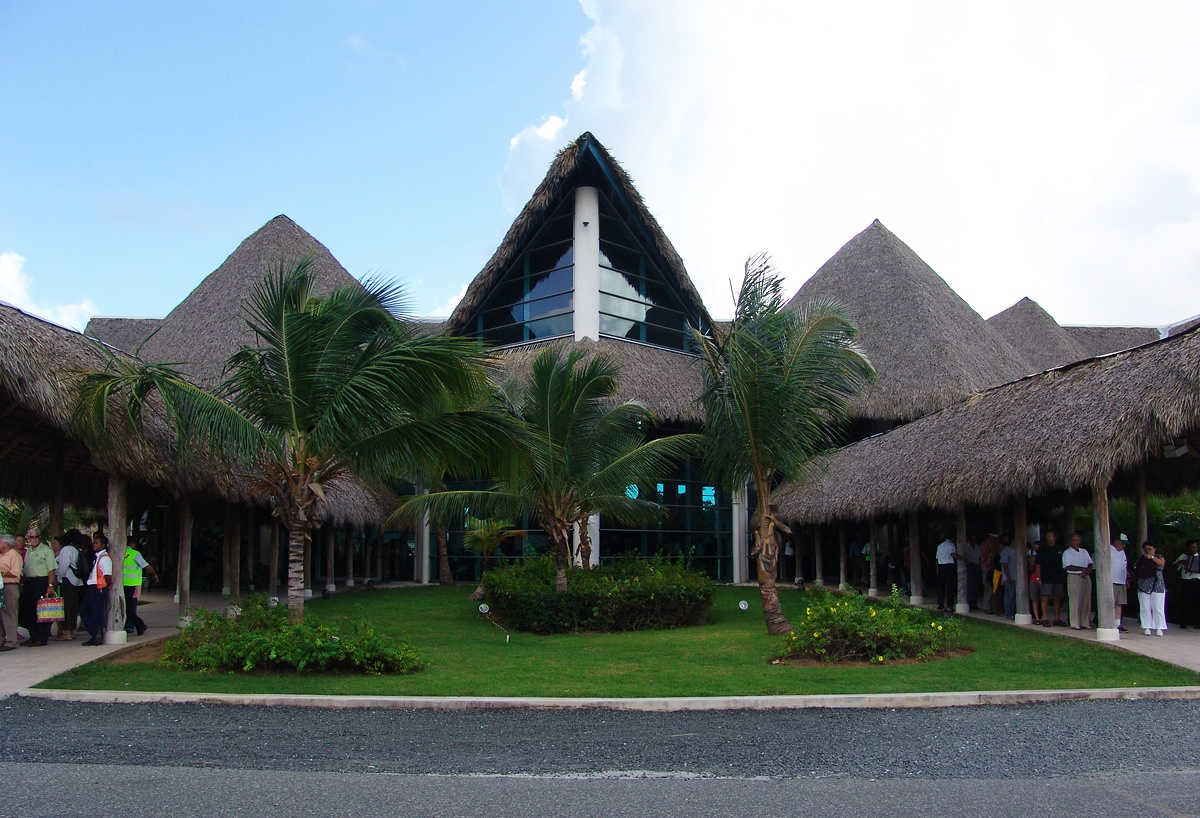
- Punta Cana International Airport in 2007
- IATA: PUJ; ICAO: MDPC

Summary
- Airport type: Private-owned, Public-use
- Owner/Operator: Grupo Puntacana
- Serves: Punta Cana, Higüey, Bávaro
- Location: Punta Cana, La Altagracia, Dominican Republic
- Opened: December 17, 1983; 42 years ago
- Hub for: Air Century; Arajet
- Elevation AMSL: 40 ft (12 m)
- Coordinates: 18°34′00″N 68°21′07″W
- Website: puntacanainternationalairport.com

Map
- Location of airport in Dominican Republic

Runways
Direction	Length		Surface
Direction	ft	m	Surface
08/26	10,171	3,100	Asphalt concrete
09/27	10,171	3,100	Asphalt concrete

Statistics (2025)
- Total passengers: 11,006,110
- Aircraft operations: 61,530
- Source: Banco Central República Dominicana^{1} Runway 08/26 Main runway.^{2} Runway 09/27 back up runway.

Punta Cana International Airport (Spanish: Aeropuerto Internacional de Punta Cana) (IATA: PUJ, ICAO: MDPC), is a privately owned commercial airport in Punta Cana, eastern Dominican Republic. The airport was built with open-air terminals and roofs covered in palm fronds. Grupo Puntacana built the airport, which was designed by architect Oscar Imbert, and inaugurated it in December 1983. It is owned by Grupo Puntacana and became the first privately owned international airport in the world.

The airport is the busiest in the Dominican Republic, and the second-busiest of the Caribbean, only behind Puerto Rico's Luis Muñoz Marín International Airport. In 2022, more than 8.3 million passengers (arrivals and departures combined) passed through the terminals that year, with almost 50,000 commercial aircraft operations. In 2023, the airport accounted for 60% of all air arrivals in the Dominican Republic. The airport serves 90 airports in 26 countries.

== History ==
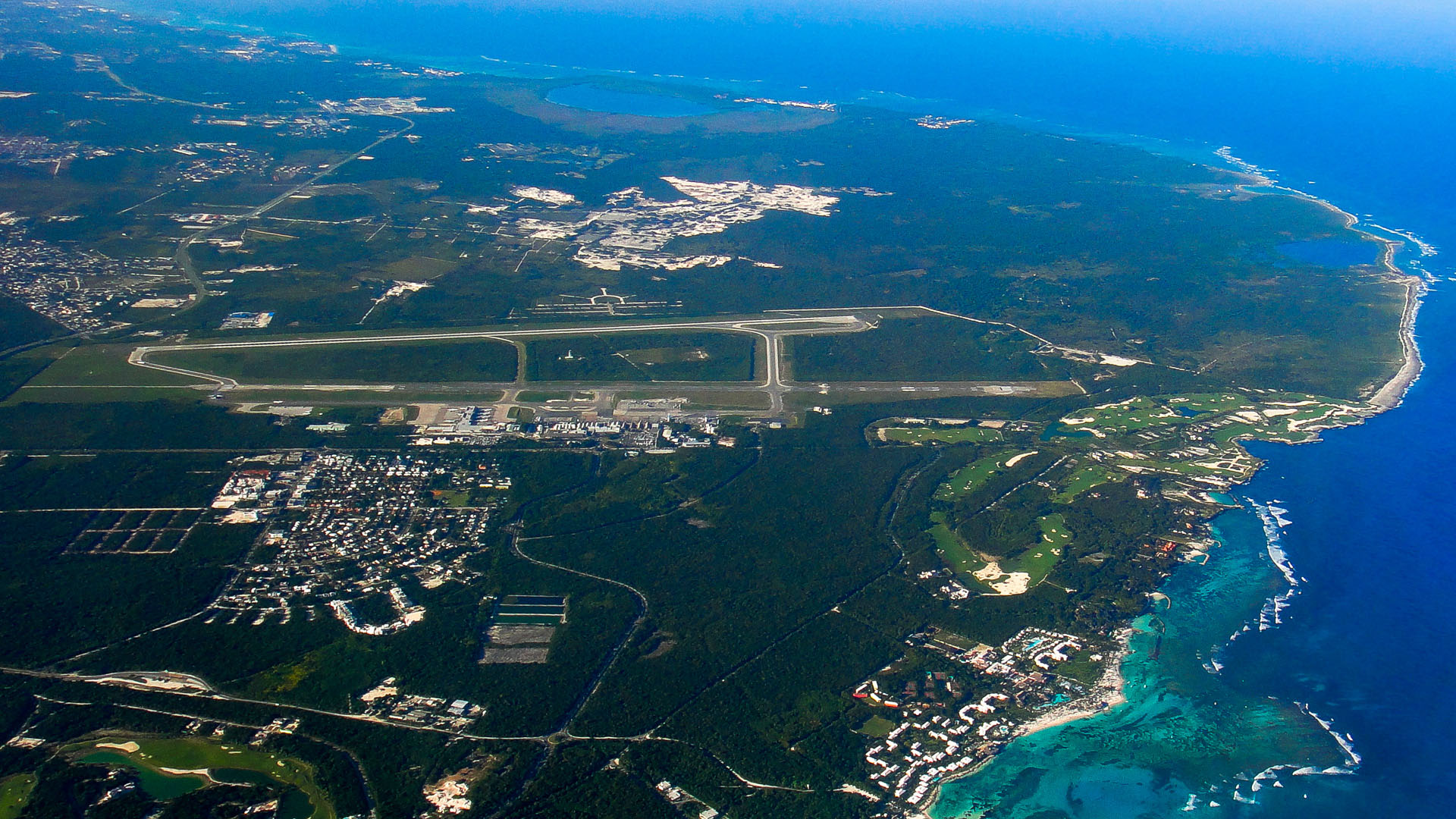
Aerial view

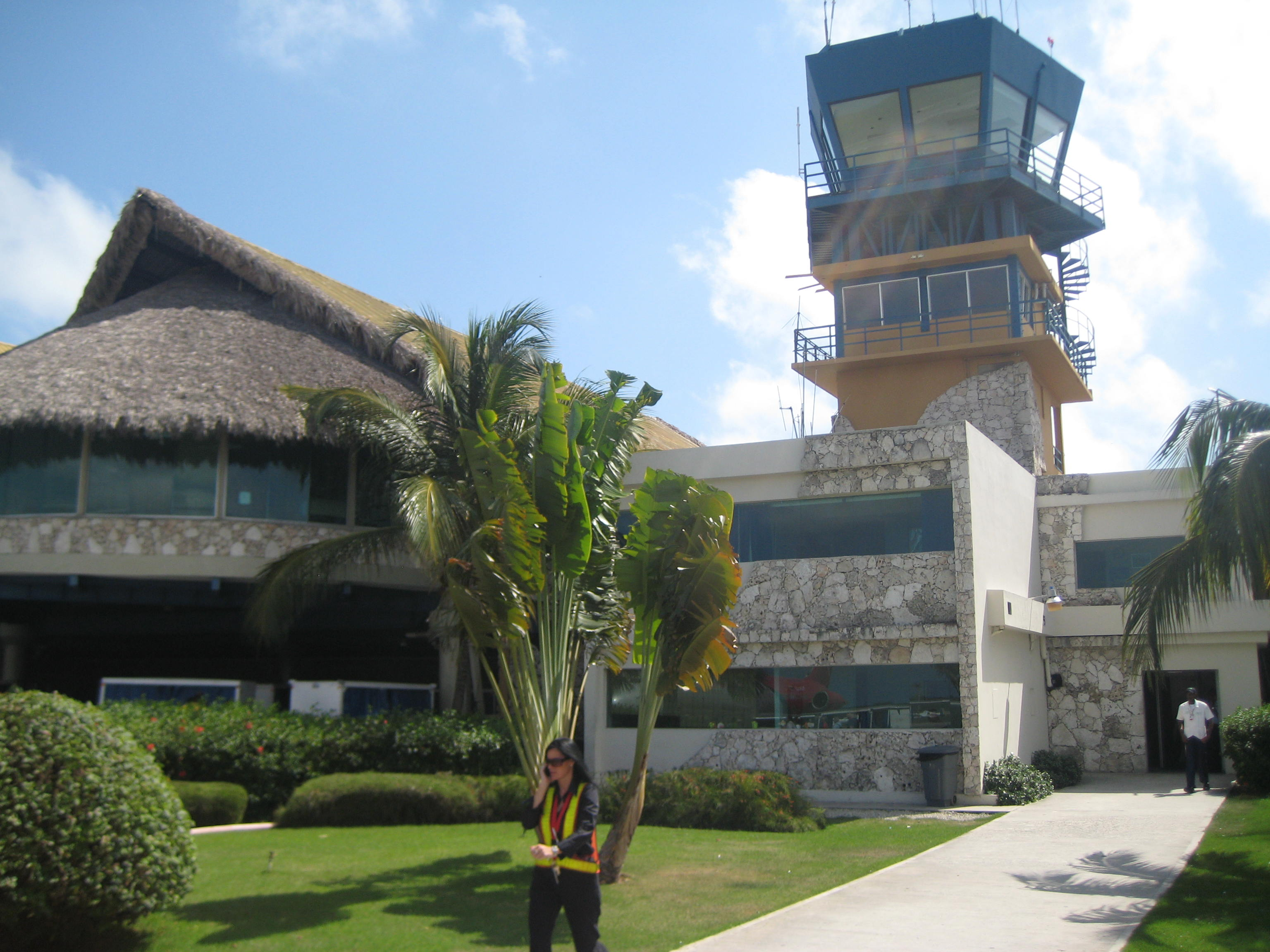
Control tower

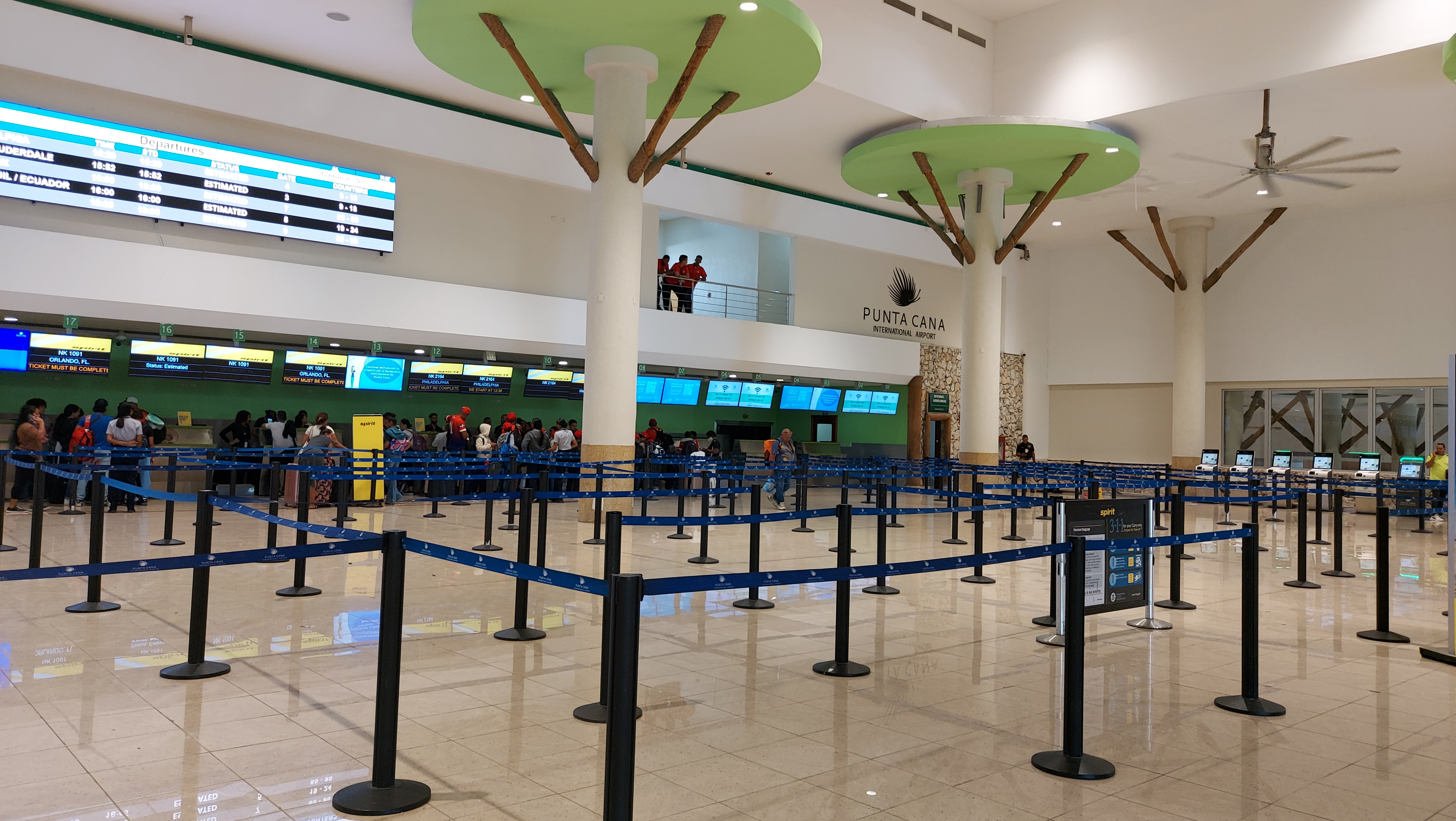
Terminal interior

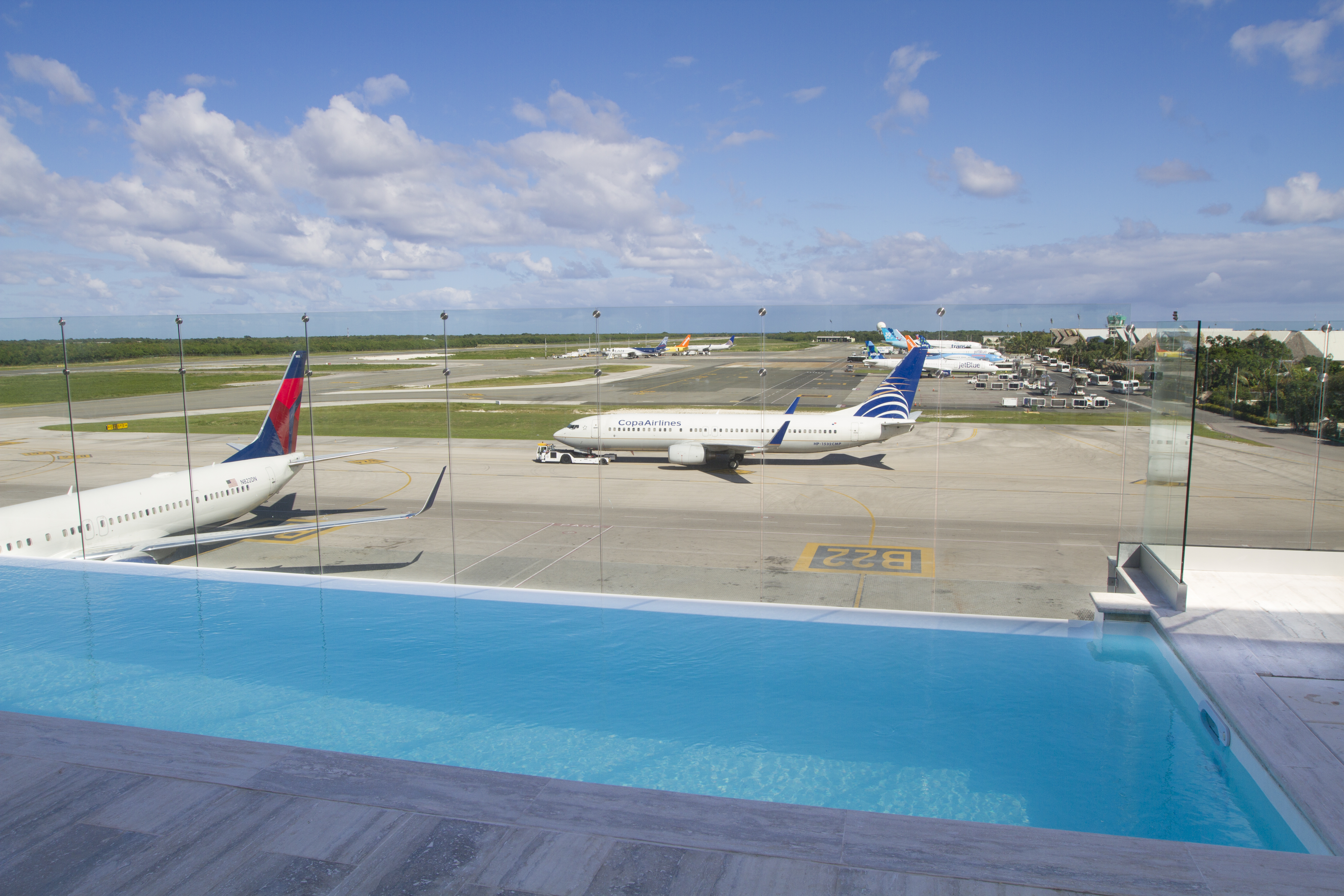
Terminal exterior

=== Beginnings ===
The history of aviation in the Punta Cana region started in 1971, when Grupo Puntacana built the first hotel in the area, called "Punta Cana Club", along with a small airstrip. There were no terminals and no runway; it was just a flat piece of land. The only problem was that the area was very secluded from the rest of the Dominican Republic. Also, many more people were starting to go to Punta Cana for vacation, with more and more small cabins being built. Since there were no roads nor harbors, the only way to get into Punta Cana was by air.

In the late 1970s a road was built to connect the area with the capital of La Altagracia Province, Higüey. Tourists from various countries started to come in. They had to pass through Las Américas International Airport in Santo Domingo, then take a short flight in a small plane to Punta Cana. The airstrip itself had significant problems, such as having a very short runway and still no terminal. This meant passengers would exit their plane and be directed onto a road to be picked up to ride to their hotel, which was inconvenient. Grupo PuntaCana knew it needed a real airport.

=== 1980s ===
In January 1984, Punta Cana had its first international flight from San Juan, Puerto Rico, operated by the Puerto Rican airline, Prinair. The aircraft was a small double turbo propeller aircraft with 20 passengers. In 1984, the airport received 2,976 passengers.

With a proper airport, many new hotels were built. As a result, this brought an increased demand to bring jet aircraft to Punta Cana, since the airport would have to accommodate more people. This led to the airport's first expansion in 1986. The runway was extended to 7,500 feet (2,300 m), and there was a small expansion in the check-in area of the terminal, along with the renovation of the terminal. The tarmac was also expanded to accommodate jet aircraft, and the control tower had new radar systems added to it. This expansion allowed many more aircraft to land at the airport. In 1987, the first route between Punta Cana and the United States began, with Miami International Airport.

=== 2000s ===
In 2000, after the completion of the expansion, the terminal was renovated and expanded to twice its original size to 6,500 square feet (600 m^{2}). A long taxiway was added to prevent a collision on the runway, and the tarmac was expanded to fit six aircraft. This expansion was completed in 2001, and airline growth continued.

During this time, Punta Cana was drastically changing, with the addition of new hotels, malls, and infrastructure. Many people were flying to Punta Cana annually, and once again the airport was crowded by 2002. A new parking lot was built along with the new PuntaCana Village. By 2003, there was a small expansion of the terminal and the tarmac was expanded to allow seven aircraft to park. This was also the year the Grupo Puntacana had begun the planning of a second runway.

In 2004, Terminal 2 opened, the second terminal at the airport. As many old charter carriers from the 1990s began to cease operations to the airport, each new year brought new airlines and destinations. Several prominent leisure carriers such as Transaero, Pullmantur Air, and Corsairfly started operations with large aircraft such as the Boeing 747.

=== 2010s ===
In 2011, a new second runway was opened, which permitted more long-haul flights from countries like France, England, and Brazil with large planes such as the Boeing 747-400, the Boeing 777, and the Airbus A340. With this expansion, the airport became the first in the Caribbean to have two runways longer than 10,000 feet. Along with the new runway, a new control tower, Terminal Approach Radar Control facility and a new Automated Weather Observation Station (AWOS) were all presented.

In November 2014, Terminal B was officially inaugurated. This terminal uses jet bridges, the first terminal at the airport to use them. The new terminal is also completely enclosed, unlike the other terminals at the airport.

In November 2017, a new VIP lounge opened, which included a pool.

== Facilities ==
=== Terminals ===
The airport has five terminals:

- International Terminals A and B – international commercial passenger travel
- FBO Terminal – executive general aviation
- National Terminal – serves national charter and general aviation flights
- VIP Terminal – private terminal including an aircraft parking apron

Terminal A, the older terminal of the two international terminals, uses aircraft stairs for passengers to deplane and board aircraft with access for disabled people using wheelchair lifts. Terminal B was built with seven airbridges, three being for wide-body aircraft. This new terminal was completed in 2014 and can comfortably accommodate 6,500 travelers daily and over 2 million travelers annually. As of 2023, Terminal B was expanded with seven additional gates and three remote gates serving multiple airlines with a modern terminal expansion. Terminal B went from 7 gates to 14 gates with boarding bridges and 3 remote gates.

=== U.S. preclearance ===
Plans were underway for a U.S. Customs and Border Protection preclearance station to be opened at the airport by the end of mid 2009; however, this has not yet begun. According to Frank Rainieri, president of Grupo Puntacana, negotiations have re-opened (as of June 2015) and he anticipates that this airport will be the first in Latin America to offer such preclearance service. As of December 2020, the preclearance station is still planned, but is waiting to receive authorization from the Dominican Government to begin construction.

== Airlines and destinations ==
The following airlines operate regular scheduled and charter flights at Punta Cana International Airport:

Airlines	Destinations
Aerolíneas Argentinas	Buenos Aires–Ezeiza, Córdoba (AR), Rosario, Tucumán
Aeroméxico	Mexico City–Benito Juárez
Air Canada	Montréal–Trudeau; Seasonal: Halifax, Ottawa, Toronto–Pearson
Air Canada Rouge	Toronto–Pearson; Seasonal: Montréal–Trudeau, Winnipeg (begins 10 December 2026)
Air Caraïbes	Paris–Orly
Air Century	Barquisimeto, Caracas, Maracaibo, Valencia (VE)
Air Europa	Madrid
Air France	Seasonal: Paris–Charles de Gaulle
Air Transat	Montréal–Trudeau, Québec City, Toronto–Pearson; Seasonal: Halifax, London (ON), Moncton, Ottawa, Windsor
American Airlines	Charlotte, Chicago–O'Hare, Dallas/Fort Worth, Miami, New York–JFK, Philadelphia; Seasonal: Boston, Indianapolis, Nashville, Pittsburgh, Raleigh/Durham
Arajet	Bogotá, Buenos Aires–Ezeiza, Cartagena, Cancún, Chicago–O'Hare, Córdoba (AR), Guayaquil, Kingston–Norman Manley, Lima, Medellín–JMC, Mendoza, Mexico City–Felipe Ángeles, Miami, Montevideo (begins 3 March 2027), Montréal–Trudeau, Newark, Orlando/Sanford, Quito, Rosario, San Juan, Santiago de Chile, São Paulo–Guarulhos, Toronto–Pearson
Avianca	Bogota
Avianca Ecuador	Quito
Breeze Airways	Raleigh/Durham, Tampa; Seasonal: Columbus–Glenn (begins 8 January 2027), Pittsburgh (begins 7 January 2027)
British Airways	London–Gatwick, London–Heathrow
Condor	Frankfurt
Copa Airlines	Panama City–Tocumen
Delta Air Lines	Atlanta, New York–JFK; Seasonal: Boston, Detroit, Minneapolis/St. Paul
Discover Airlines	Frankfurt; Seasonal: Munich
Edelweiss Air	Seasonal: Zurich
Flair Airlines	Toronto–Pearson; Seasonal: Montréal–Trudeau (resumes 17 December 2026)
Frontier Airlines	Atlanta, Cinninnati, Cleveland, Philadelphia, St. Louis
Gol Linhas Aéreas	São Paulo–Guarulhos (ends 31 January 2027)
Iberojet	Madrid; Seasonal charter: Porto
JetBlue	Boston, Fort Lauderdale, New York–JFK, Orlando, San Juan, Tampa
JetSmart Colombia	Cali, Medellín–JMC
LATAM Brasil	São Paulo–Guarulhos
LATAM Peru	Lima
Liat Air	Dominica–Douglas-Charles
LOT Polish Airlines	Seasonal: Katowice
Neos	Seasonal: Milan–Malpensa
RUTACA Airlines	Caracas
SKY Airline Peru	Lima
Southwest Airlines	Baltimore, Chicago–Midway, Nashville, Orlando; Seasonal: Austin (begins 5 June 2027), Houston–Hobby, Kansas City, Pittsburgh (begins 5 June 2027), St. Louis
Sun Country Airlines	Seasonal: Milwaukee, Minneapolis/St. Paul
Sunrise Airways	Port-au-Prince (suspended)
TUI Airways	London–Gatwick, Manchester; Seasonal: Belfast–International, Birmingham
TUI fly Netherlands	Amsterdam, Curaçao
TUI fly Nordic	Seasonal charter: Stockholm–Arlanda
United Airlines	Chicago–O'Hare, Denver, Houston–Intercontinental, Newark, Washington–Dulles
WestJet	Calgary, Montréal–Trudeau, Québec City, Toronto–Pearson; Seasonal: Bagotville, Deer Lake, Edmonton, Fredericton, Gander, Halifax, Hamilton (ON), Kitchener/Waterloo, London (ON), Moncton, Ottawa, Regina, St. John's (NL), Saskatoon, Thunder Bay, Winnipeg
Wingo	Bogotá, Medellín–JMC
World2Fly	Madrid

== Statistics ==
Busiest international routes from PUJ (2025)
Rank	City	Passengers	Carriers
1	Toronto–Pearson, Canada	913,780	Air Canada, Air Canada Rouge, Air Transat, Arajet, Flair Airlines, WestJet
2	Panama City–Tocumen, Panama	797,299	Copa Airlines
3	New York–JFK, United States	686,130	American Airlines, Delta Air Lines, JetBlue
4	Montréal–Trudeau, Canada	616,828	Air Canada, Air Canada Rouge, Air Transat, Arajet, WestJet
5	Lima, Peru	490,150	Arajet, LATAM Peru, Sky Airlines Peru
6	Miami, United States	477,432	American Airlines, Arajet, LATAM Chile
7	Atlanta, United States	437,389	Delta Air Lines, Frontier Airlines
8	Bogotá, Colombia	417,690	Arajet, Avianca, Wingo
9	Charlotte, United States	373,356	American Airlines
10	Newark, United States	350,261	Arajet, JetBlue, United Airlines

== Accidents and incidents ==
- On 22 May 2005, a Skyservice 767–300 suffered from a fracture in the upper fuselage and damaged landing gear after experiencing a hard landing and bouncing multiple times following a flight from Toronto. There were a few injuries but no fatalities among the 318 occupants of the aircraft and it was repaired and returned to service.
- On 13 October 2014, the engine of a Jetstream Bae 32 aircraft belonging to Air Century Airlines caught fire while landing after a charter flight from Luis Muñoz Marín International Airport in San Juan, Puerto Rico. The airplane crew declared an emergency and landed the aircraft at 20:45 local time, after a 49-minute flight, but the plane was destroyed in a subsequent fire. There were no injuries among the 13 passengers and two crew members.
- On 10 February 2016, Orenair Flight 554 to Moscow Domodedovo Airport reported an engine fire and smoke in the cabin. The crew decided to turn around and land the aircraft, without dumping fuel, rather circling around the airport. Upon landing the overweight aircraft, the landing gear overheated and caught fire, and the aircraft was evacuated. There were no injuries among the 371 occupants of the Boeing 777 and it remained grounded at the airport for ten months, leaving in December 2016.

== See also ==
- List of the busiest airports in Dominican Republic
- List of the busiest airports in the Caribbean
- Tourism
