= PGL =

PGL may refer to:

- PGL (company), UK
- Pampanga Giant Lanterns, a Filipino professional basketball team.
- Professional Gamers League, former US electronic sports league
- Persistent generalized lymphadenopathy
- Polish Aviation Group (Polish: Polska Grupa Lotnicza)
- Projective linear group, in mathematics
- Paraganglioma, a type of rare neuroendocrine neoplasm
- The succinate dehydrogenase SDHD (previously known as PGL1) and SDHC (previously PGL3)
- PGL Esports, a Romanian esports production company
- Provincial Grand Lodge
