= Condor Flugdienst Flight 3782 =

1988 aviation accident

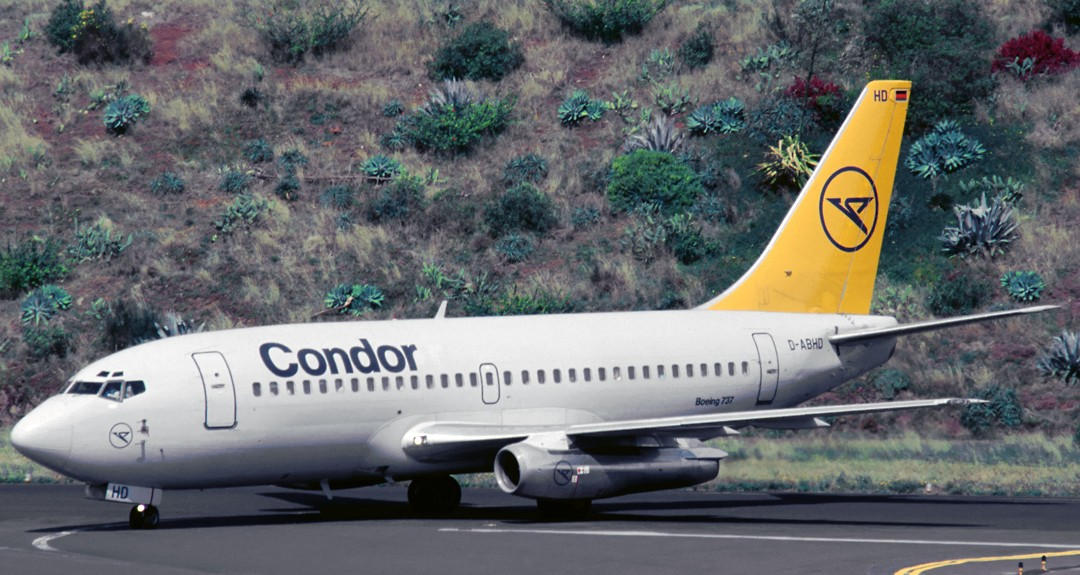
- D-ABHD, the aircraft involved in the accident, pictured in 1987

Accident
- Date: 2 January 1988
- Summary: Controlled flight into terrain due to pilot error
- Site: near Seferihisar, Turkey; 38°12′25″N 26°56′24″E

Aircraft
- Aircraft type: Boeing 737-230
- Operator: Condor
- Registration: D-ABHD
- Flight origin: Stuttgart-Echterdingen Airport, Stuttgart, West Germany
- Destination: Adnan Menderes Airport, İzmir, Turkey
- Passengers: 11
- Crew: 5
- Fatalities: 16
- Survivors: 0

Condor Flugdienst Flight 3782 was an international charter flight from Stuttgart-Echterdingen Airport, West Germany to Adnan Menderes Airport, Turkey operated by a Boeing 737-200 that crashed near Seferihisar, Turkey on 2 January 1988. At the time, Condor was a subsidiary of Lufthansa.

== Aircraft ==
The aircraft was a Boeing 737-230 with the serial number 22635/774 and it was registered D-ABHD. Its first flight was on June 15, 1981, and it was delivered in July of the same year to the airline. The aircraft was equipped with 2 Pratt & Whitney JT8D-17A engines.

The captain, Wolfgang Hechler (48), was a former Starfighter pilot. The First Officer was Helmut Zöller (33).

== Accident description ==
The flight was uneventful until final approach, when the aircraft, with the co-pilot acting as Pilot flying, was cleared for an ILS approach to the Outer Marker (Non-Directional Beacon) and then on to Runway 35. The aircraft's ILS was switched on after it had passed the NDB, therefore missing the turn. The crew, confused, then followed the wrong side beam of the ILS, and struck Dümentepe Hill, 10.5 nautical miles (12.1 mi; 19.4 km) from the airport, killing all 16 people on board.

== Investigation ==
According to the evaluation of the cockpit voice recorder, captain Hechler continuously talked to First Officer Zöller, even in the approach phase and kept on criticising, lambasting and insulting him, partly without reference to duty or work subjects. The investigation concluded that the accident occurred due to the incorrect use of navigation aids. The cause is attributed mainly to the lack of adherence to company procedures, especially with respect to crew coordination during approach and basic instrument flying procedures.

== See also ==
- American Airlines Flight 965, another aircraft that crashed due to navigational errors.
