= Marabu (airline) =

Airline based in Germany

Marabu Airlines OÜ

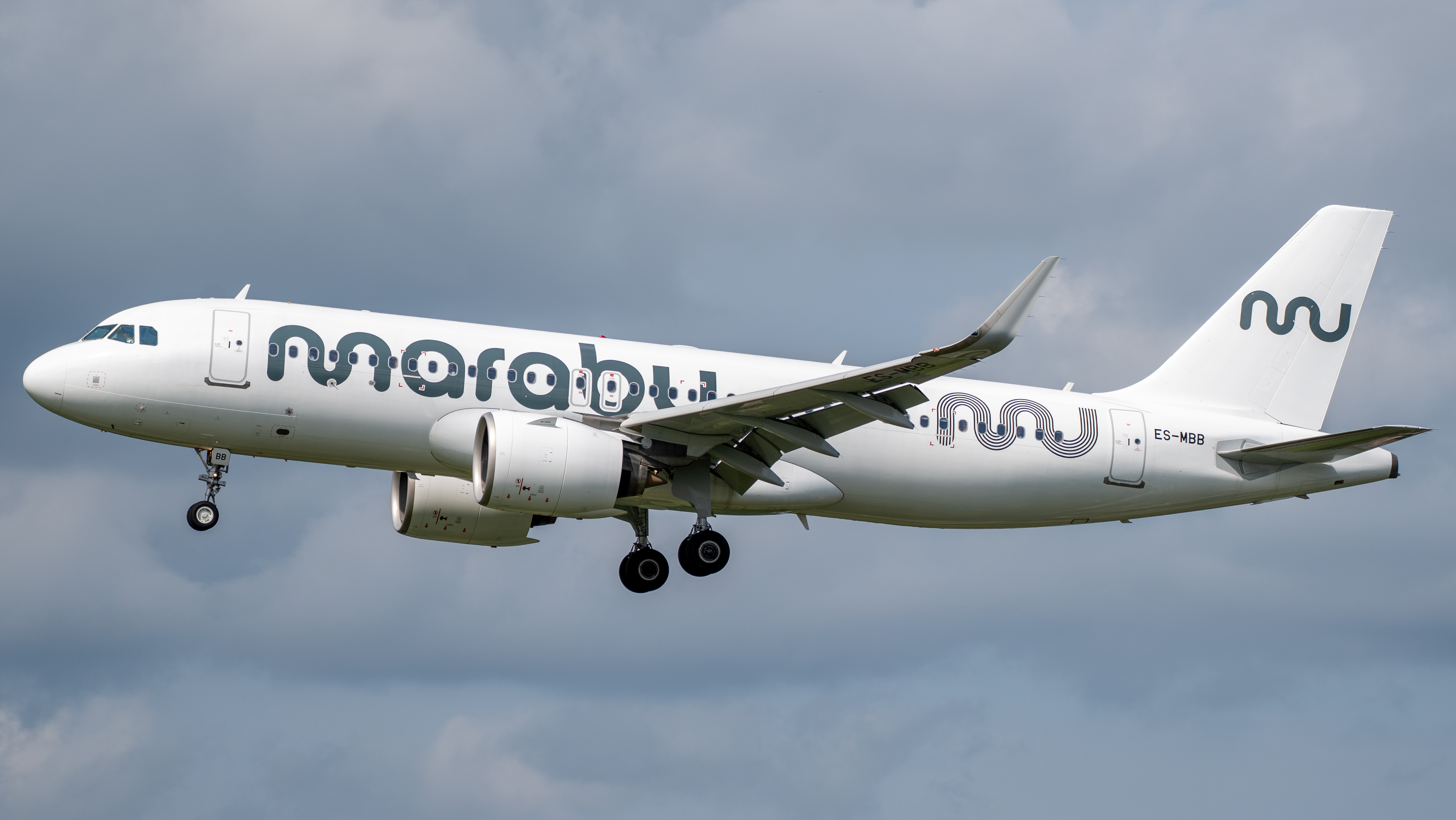
- Airbus A320neo
IATA	ICAO	Call sign
DI	MBU	MARABU
- Founded: 13 December 2022; 3 years ago
- Commenced operations: 15 April 2023; 3 years ago
- Operating bases: Hamburg Airport; Nuremberg Airport; Stuttgart Airport; Leipzig Halle Airport
- Fleet size: 11
- Parent company: Attestor Capital
- Headquarters: Tallinn, Estonia
- Key people: Axel Schefe (CEO); Paul Fabian (COO); Mattias Tammeaid (CoS)
- Website: flymarabu.com

Marabu, styled as marabu and legally incorporated as Marabu Airlines OÜ, is an Estonian leisure airline headquartered in Tallinn, with operations based at Hamburg Airport, Leipzig Airport and Nuremberg Airport in Germany, as well as two seasonal bases, Mallorca Airport in Spain and Heraklion Airport in Greece. Ticket sales are handled by Condor, which describes the carrier as a "sister airline".

== History ==
On 13 December 2022, Attestor Capital, the owner of a 51% stake in German leisure airline Condor, announced the incorporation of an Estonia-registered carrier, with operations starting in the 2023 summer season, utilising Airbus A320neo aircraft chartered from Nordica. The carrier is fully owned by German-based special purpose vehicle CD Ferienflug Hessen Holding GmbH.

On 15 April 2023, Marabu's first aircraft, registered ES-MBU, flew the first service from Munich to Palma de Mallorca under the callsign MBU6508.

Shortly after its inauguration, Marabu faced media attention and severe criticism due to several major delays, flight cancellations and supposedly insufficient communication to customers. The airline stated technical issues with leased aircraft and missing cabin crew as a cause, and planned to phase-in additional third-party operators to stabilize the schedule. Trying to stabilize its operations, Marabu cancelled their routes from both Hamburg and Munich to Tallinn before they even started, and cut the flights from Hamburg to Rome after just a few flights.

== Destinations ==
The carrier serves around 20 holiday destinations in Croatia, Egypt, Greece, Italy, Portugal and Spain. It was also announced that a larger range of destinations in Germany would be served.

Country	City	Airport	Notes
Croatia	Split	Split Airport	
Egypt	Hurghada	Hurghada International Airport	
Germany	Berlin	Berlin Brandenburg Airport	
Germany	Düsseldorf	Düsseldorf Airport	
Germany	Frankfurt	Frankfurt Airport	
Germany	Hamburg	Hamburg Airport	
Germany	Leipzig/Halle	Leipzig-Halle Airport	
Germany	Munich	Munich Airport	
Germany	Nuremberg	Nuremberg Airport	
Germany	Stuttgart	Stuttgart Airport	
Germany	Cologne/Bonn	Cologne Bonn Airport	
Greece	Chania	Chania International Airport	
Greece	Corfu	Corfu International Airport	
Greece	Heraklion	Heraklion International Airport	
Greece	Karpathos	Karpathos Island National Airport	
Greece	Kefalonia	Kefalonia International Airport	
Greece	Kos	Kos International Airport	
Greece	Preveza/Lefkada	Aktion National Airport	
Greece	Rhodes	Rhodes International Airport	
Greece	Volos	Nea Anchialos National Airport	
Greece	Zakynthos	Zakynthos International Airport	
Italy	Rome	Leonardo da Vinci-Fiumicino Airport	Terminated
Italy	Olbia	Olbia Costa Smeralda Airport	
Italy	Lamezia Terme	Lamezia Terme International Airport	
Portugal	Faro	Faro Airport	
Spain	Fuerteventura	Fuerteventura Airport	
Spain	Gran Canaria	Gran Canaria Airport	
Spain	Jerez de la Frontera	Jerez Airport	
Spain	Lanzarote	Lanzarote Airport	
Spain	Malaga	Malaga Airport	
Spain	Palma de Mallorca	Palma de Mallorca Airport	
Spain	Santa Cruz de La Palma	La Palma Airport	
Spain	Tenerife	Tenerife-South Airport	

=== Airline partnerships ===
Besides a codeshare partnership with Condor, Marabu also has a partnership with Bul Air a charter brand of Bulgaria Air.

== Fleet ==
=== Current fleet ===
As of July 2026, Marabu operates the following aircraft:

Aircraft	In service	Orders	Passengers
Airbus A320neo	11	—	180
Total	11	—	

=== Former fleet ===
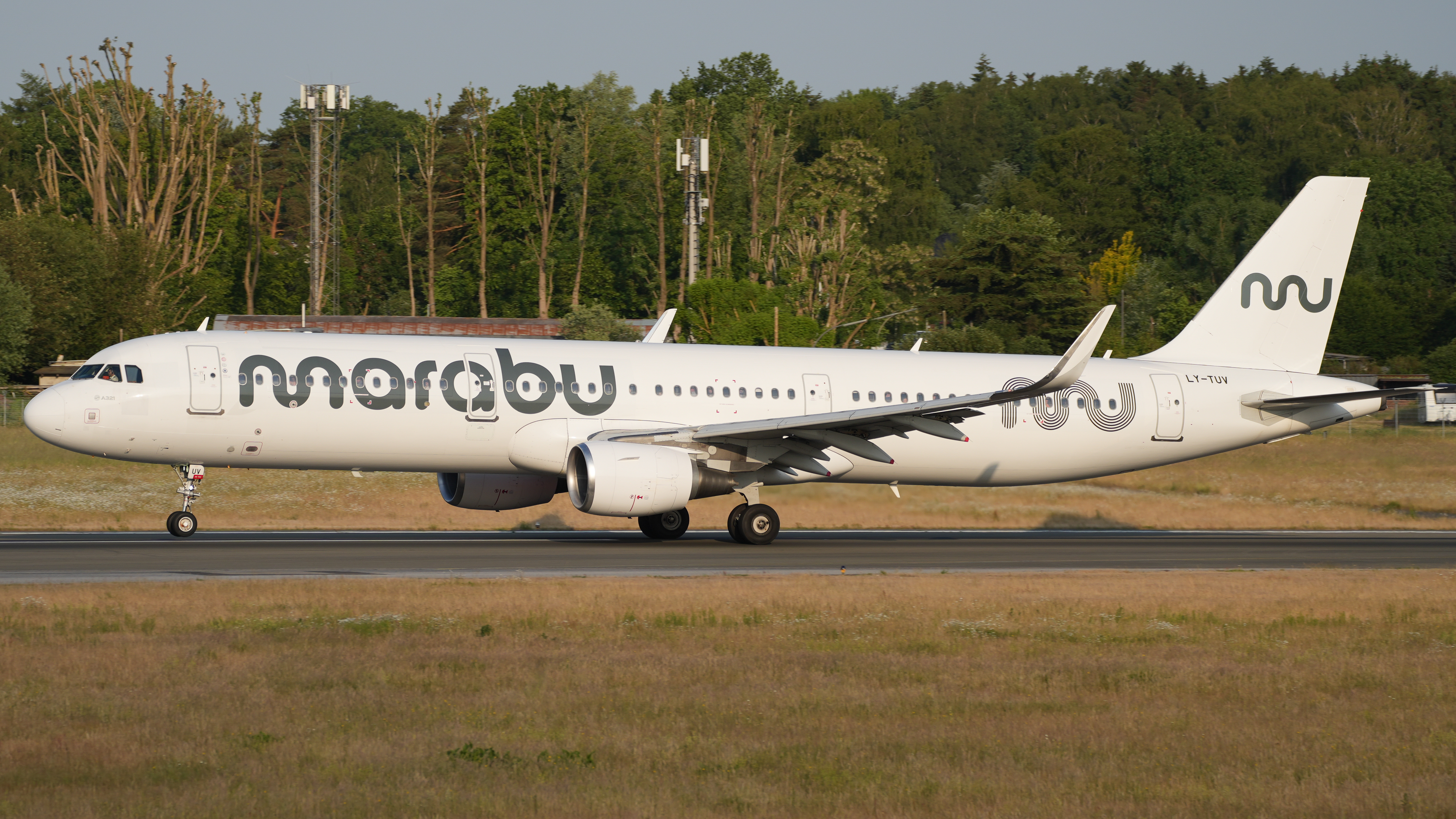
Airbus A321-200

As of August 2025, Marabu operated 12 Airbus A320neo

Marabu had also operated the following aircraft types in the past:

Former Marabu fleet
Aircraft	Total	Introduced	Retired	Notes
Airbus A321-200	2	2023	2023	Leased from Heston Airlines.
Boeing 737-800	1	2024	2024	Leased from KlasJet.
