= Hamburg Airways =

German airline (2011–2014)

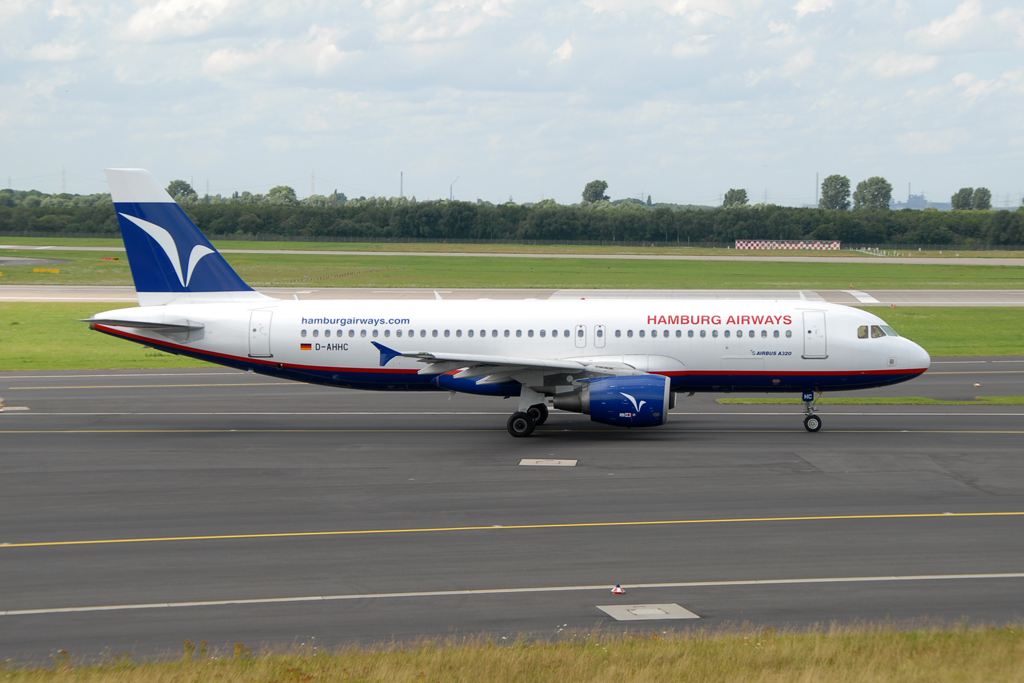
- Airbus A320-200
IATA	ICAO	Call sign
HK	HAY	HAMBURG AIRWAYS
- Founded: December 2010
- Commenced operations: March 2011
- Ceased operations: December 2014
- Operating bases: Düsseldorf Airport; Hamburg Airport; Hannover Airport
- Focus cities: Friedrichshafen Airport; Münster Osnabrück Airport
- Headquarters: Hamburg, Germany
- Key people: Sergej Fieger
- Website: hamburgairways.com

Hamburg Airways (legally HHA Hamburg Airways Luftverkehrsgesellschaft GmbH) was a small charter airline which operating between 2010 and 2014. It was based in Hamburg airport and carried out flights on behalf of tour operators and travel agencies. The airline operated out of several German airports, but its maintenance base was located at Hamburg Airport. Flights were operated throughout Europe, Eurasia, the Middle East and Africa.

== History ==
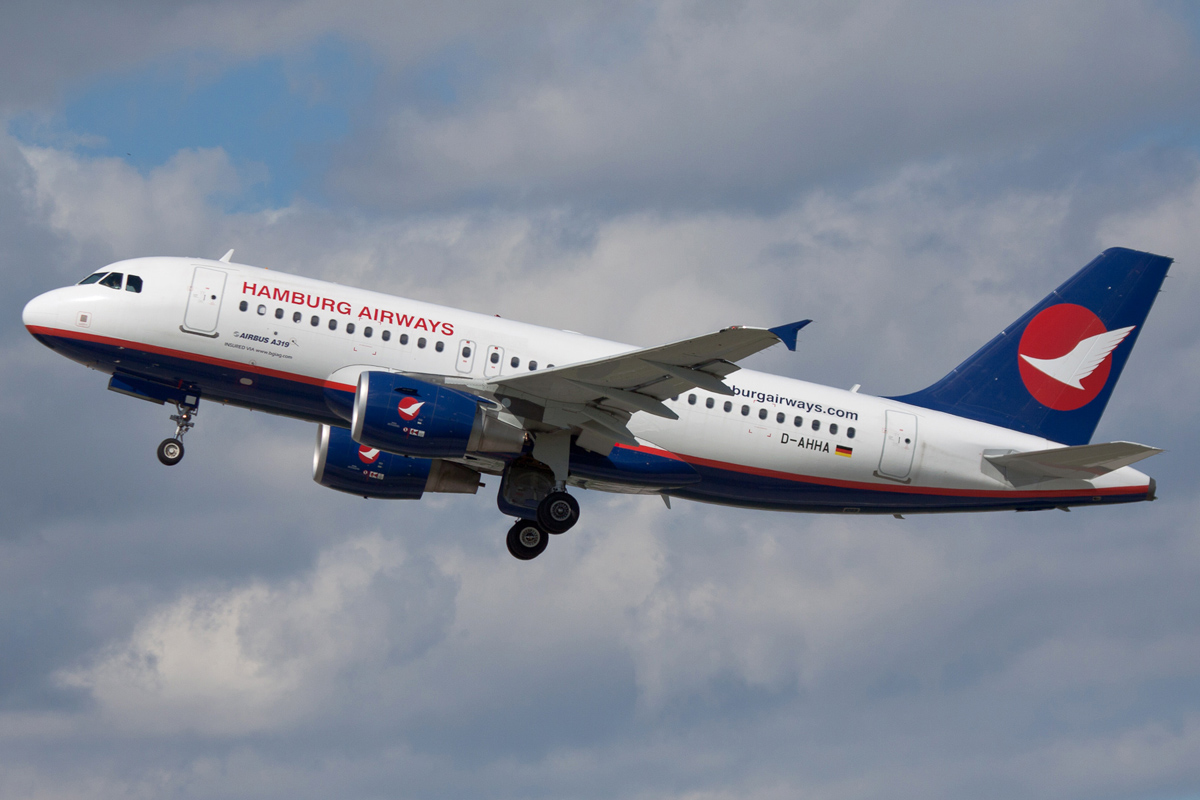
Airbus A319-100

The airline was founded in December 2010 following the demise of Hamburg International in late 2010, which had left a void in the German holiday flights market. The first Hamburg Airways revenue flights were carried out in late March 2011. During this year summer season an Airbus A319 was additionally operated on behalf of Condor.

In December 2014 the airline's Air Operator Certificate was suspended by German aviation authorities and ceased flying. Aircraft were returned to lessors, but the airline said it hoped to resume operations in 2015. The last available financial figures show losses of 10,8 million Euros in 2012. The airlines' three aircraft have been transferred to and stored at Düsseldorf Airport. As of May 2015, all three former Hamburg Airways aircraft were at the PEMCO hangar located at Tampa International Airport in Tampa, Florida, USA to be overhauled and put into service for a US airline.

== Destinations ==
Hamburg Airways served the following destinations as of 15 September 2014:

=== Africa ===
- Egypt
  - Hurghada - Hurghada International Airport
  - Marsa Alam - Marsa Alam International Airport
- Tunisia
  - Djerba - Djerba–Zarzis International Airport

=== Asia ===
- Turkey
  - Adana - Adana Şakirpaşa Airport
  - Ankara - Esenboğa International Airport
  - Antalya - Antalya Airport
  - Elazığ - Elazığ Airport
  - Gaziantep - Oğuzeli Airport
  - Hatay - Hatay Airport
  - Kayseri - Erkilet International Airport
  - Malatya - Malatya Erhaç Airport
  - Samsun - Samsun-Çarşamba Airport
  - Trabzon - Trabzon Airport
- Saudi Arabia
  - Riyadh - King Khalid International Airport

=== Europe ===
- Germany
  - Bremen - Bremen Airport
  - Dortmund - Dortmund Airport
  - Düsseldorf - Düsseldorf Airport Base
  - Erfurt - Erfurt-Weimar Airport
  - Friedrichshafen - Friedrichshafen Airport
  - Hamburg - Hamburg Airport Base
  - Hanover - Hannover Airport Base
  - Karlsruhe/Baden-Baden - Baden Airpark
  - Münster/Osnabrück - Münster/Osnabrück Airport
  - Saarbrücken - Saarbrücken Airport
  - Stuttgart - Stuttgart Airport
  - Zweibrücken - Zweibrücken Airport
- Greece
  - Heraklion - Heraklion Airport
  - Rhodes - Rhodes Airport
- Kosovo
  - Pristina - Pristina International Airport Adem Jashari
- Spain
  - Fuerteventura - Fuerteventura Airport
  - Gran Canaria - Gran Canaria Airport
  - Palma de Mallorca - Palma de Mallorca Airport
  - Tenerife - Tenerife South Airport
- United Kingdom
  - London - Heathrow Airport

== Fleet ==
As of October 2014, the Hamburg Airways fleet consisted of the following aircraft:

Aircraft type	Total	Passengers
Airbus A320-200	3	180
Total	3	
