= Condor (airline) =

German airline

Condor Flugdienst GmbH

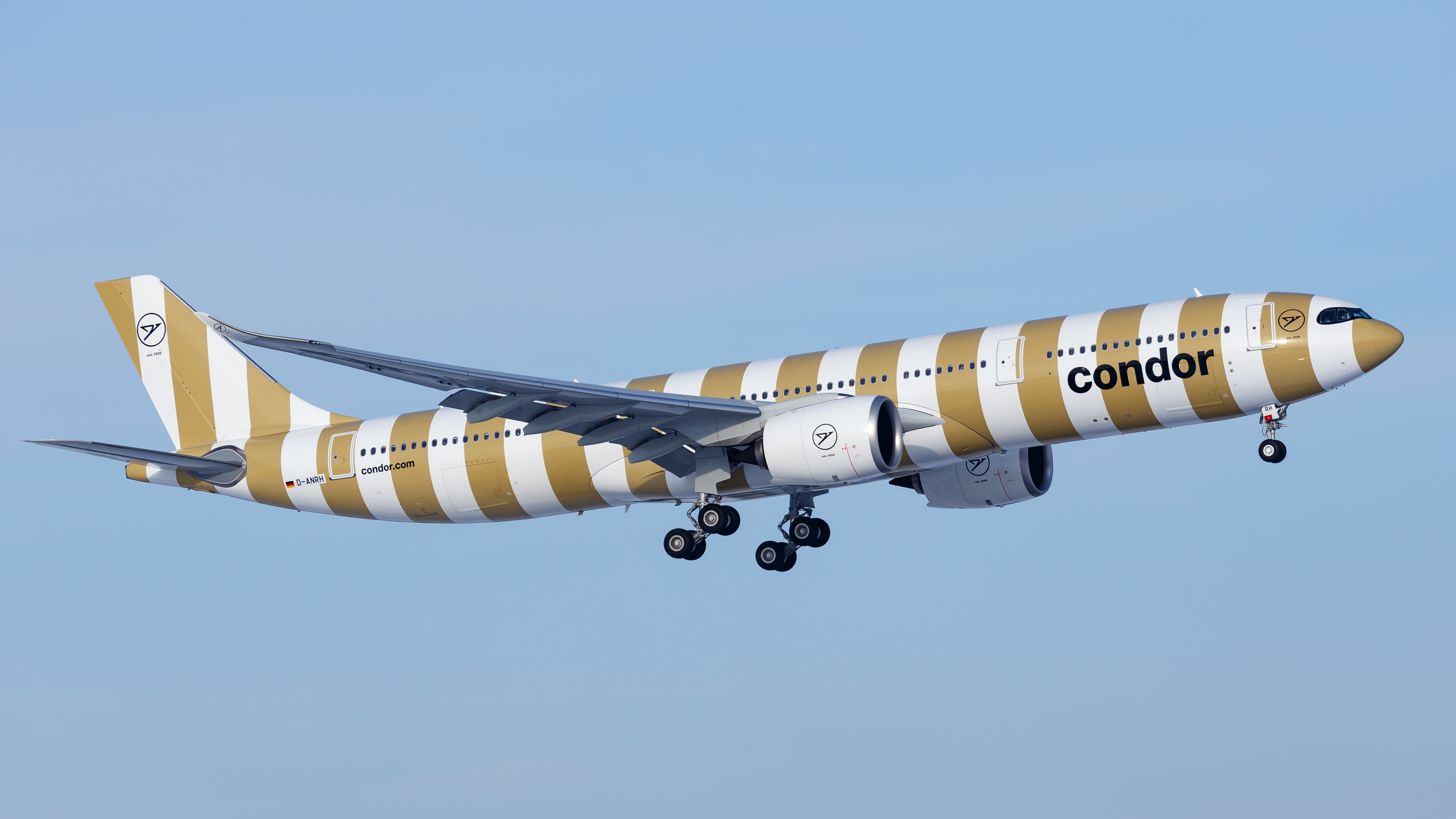
- An Airbus A330-900 in Condor's latest livery (Note: Condor's standard livery consists of the vertical stripes as pictured, but in five different color variants across their fleet.)
IATA	ICAO	Call sign
DE	CFG	CONDOR
- Founded: 21 December 1955 (as Deutsche Flugdienst GmbH)
- Commenced operations: 29 March 1956
- Operating bases: Berlin Brandenburg; Düsseldorf; Frankfurt; Hamburg; Munich; Münster/Osnabrück (begins 2 November 2026); Stuttgart; Zurich
- Frequent-flyer program: Atmos Rewards (affiliate) (formerly Mileage Plan); Emirates Skywards (affiliate)
- Fleet size: 55
- Destinations: 94
- Parent company: Attestor Capital
- Headquarters: Frankfurt, Hesse, Germany
- Key people: Peter Gerber (CEO)
- Employees: 4,900+
- Website: www.condor.com

Condor, legally incorporated as Condor Flugdienst GmbH (lit. 'Condor Flight Service'), is a German airline based in Frankfurt, Hesse. It was established in 1955 with Frankfurt Airport as its main base. Condor offers scheduled and charter flights and operates, from Germany, medium-haul flights to the Mediterranean Basin and the Canary Islands as well as long-haul flights to destinations in Africa, Asia, North America, South America, and the Caribbean. Whereas medium-haul flights are operated from many German airports and Zurich, long-haul flights usually depart from Frankfurt, with a few charter services operated from Düsseldorf and Munich.

The airline was originally established as Deutsche Flugdienst GmbH on 21 December 1955. Its initial fleet consisted of three 36-passenger Vickers VC.1 Viking aircraft. The airline's first tourist-oriented flight commenced on 29 March 1956. In 1961, Deutsche Flugdienst took over its rival Condor-Luftreederei and subsequently adopted Condor Flugdienst GmbH as its operating name. During 1966, Condor launched its first long-haul flights. By this time, the airline had a majority market share of Germany's tourism air travel market. During the 1990s, Condor was restructured and merged with other businesses to become an integrated tourism concern known as C&N Touristik.

In 2000, the Condor shares held by Lufthansa were acquired by both Thomas Cook AG and Thomas Cook Group. On 4 February 2013, Thomas Cook Group announced that Thomas Cook Airlines, Thomas Cook Airlines Belgium, and Condor would be merged into a single operating segment of the Thomas Cook Group, Thomas Cook Group Airlines.

On 23 September 2019, Condor's parent company Thomas Cook Group filed for bankruptcy; however, Condor received a bridge loan from the German government to remain in operation, as a subsidiary of Thomas Cook. In 2020, during the COVID-19 pandemic, a planned acquisition of the airline by Polish Aviation Group, owner of LOT Polish Airlines, fell through. In May 2021, a majority stake in the airline was acquired by Attestor, a British investment firm.

== History ==
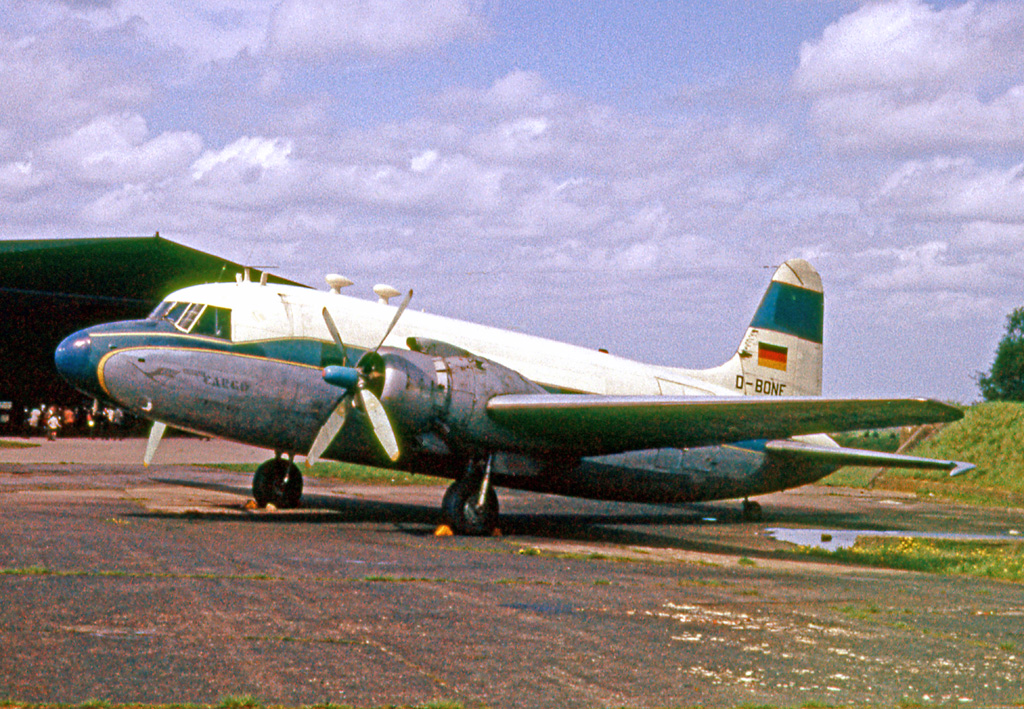
A Condor Vickers Viking 1B cargo aircraft operating for Lufthansa Cargo in 1964

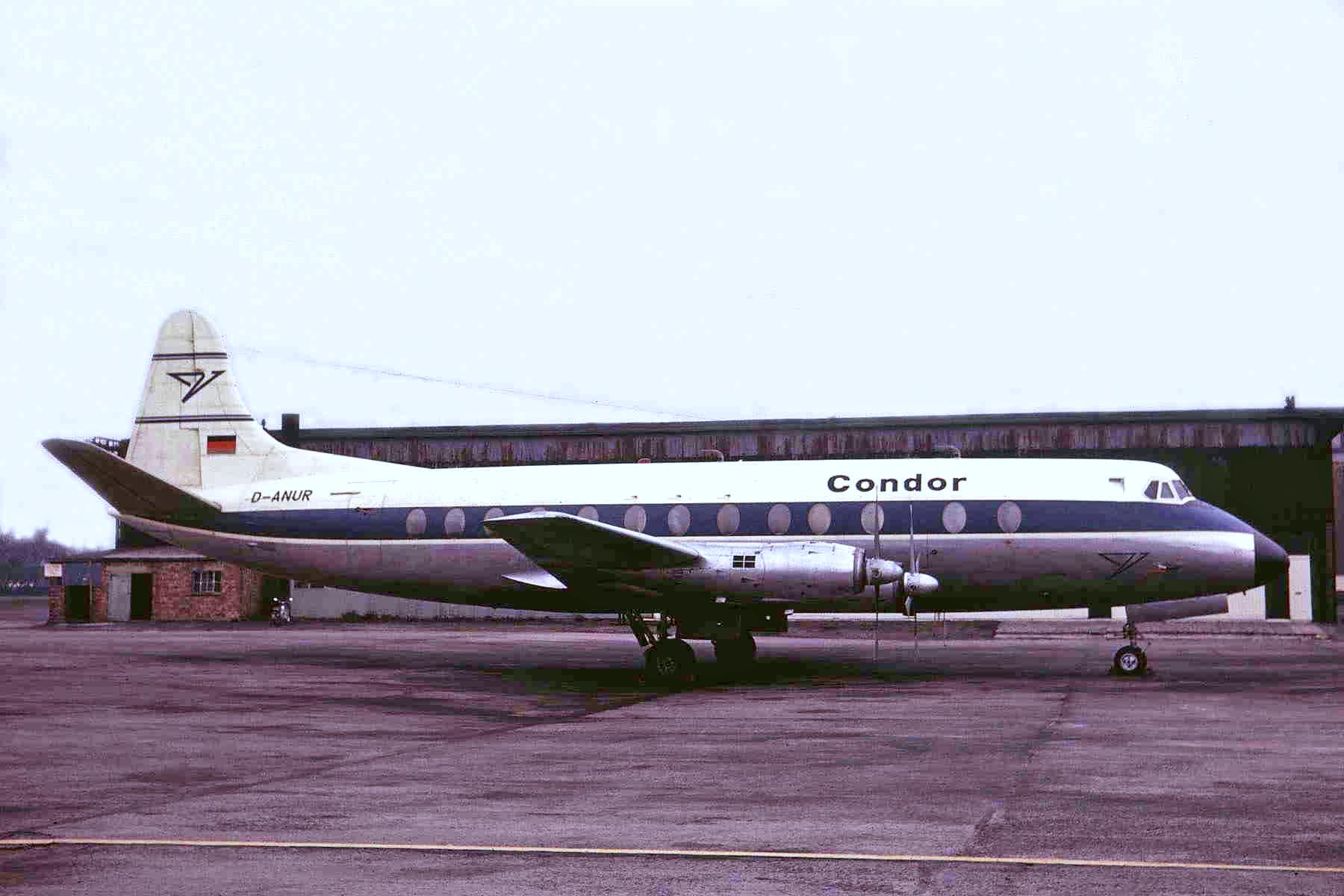
Condor Vickers Viscount in 1965

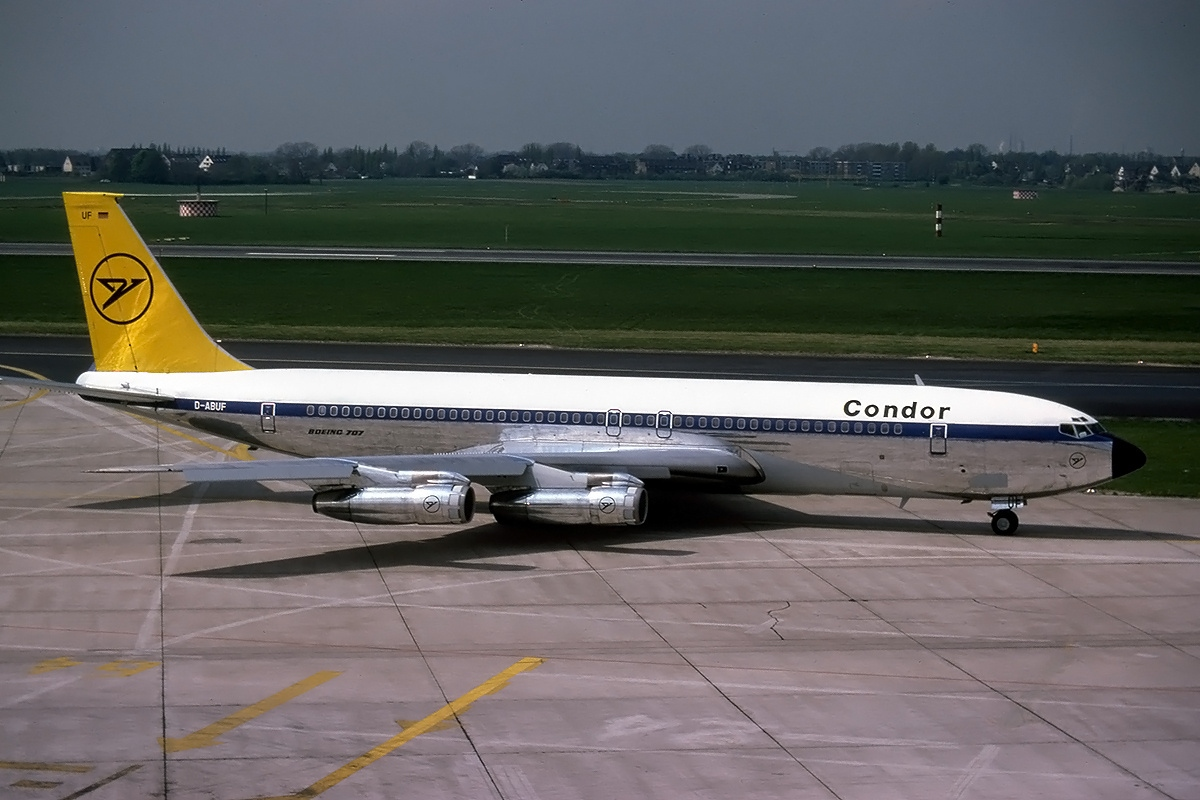
Condor Boeing 707-330 in 1978

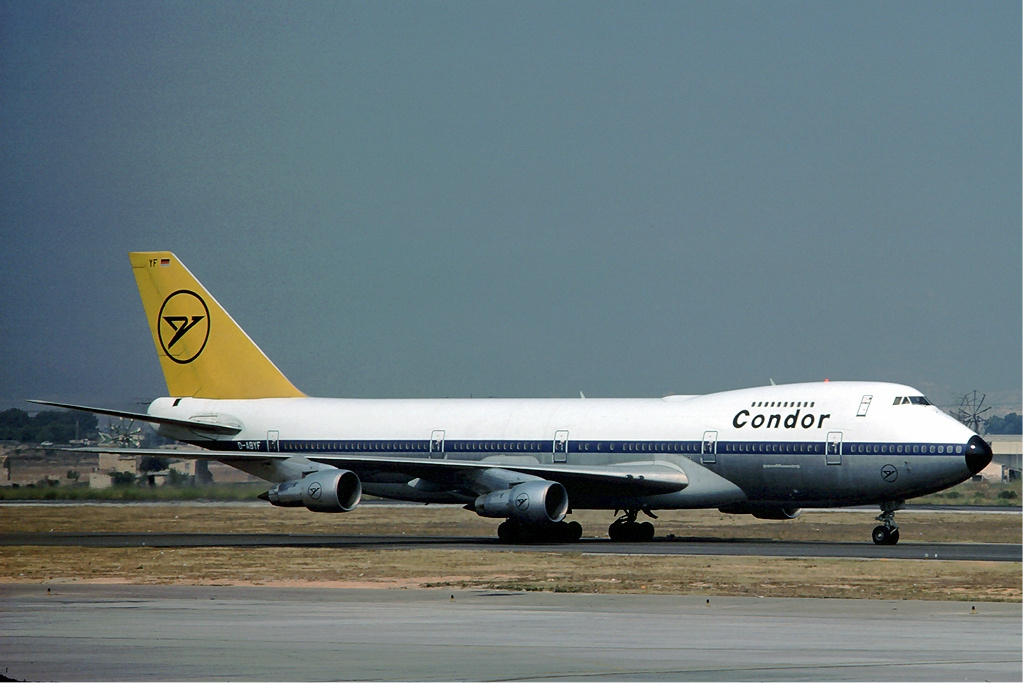
Condor Boeing 747-230 in 1976

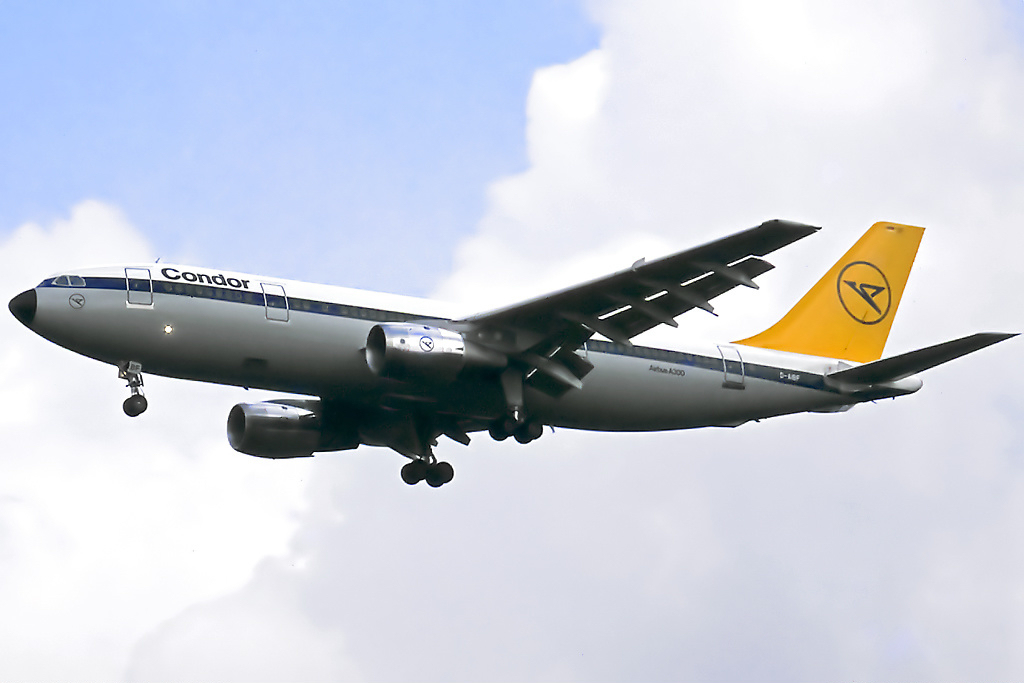
Condor Airbus A300 in 1979

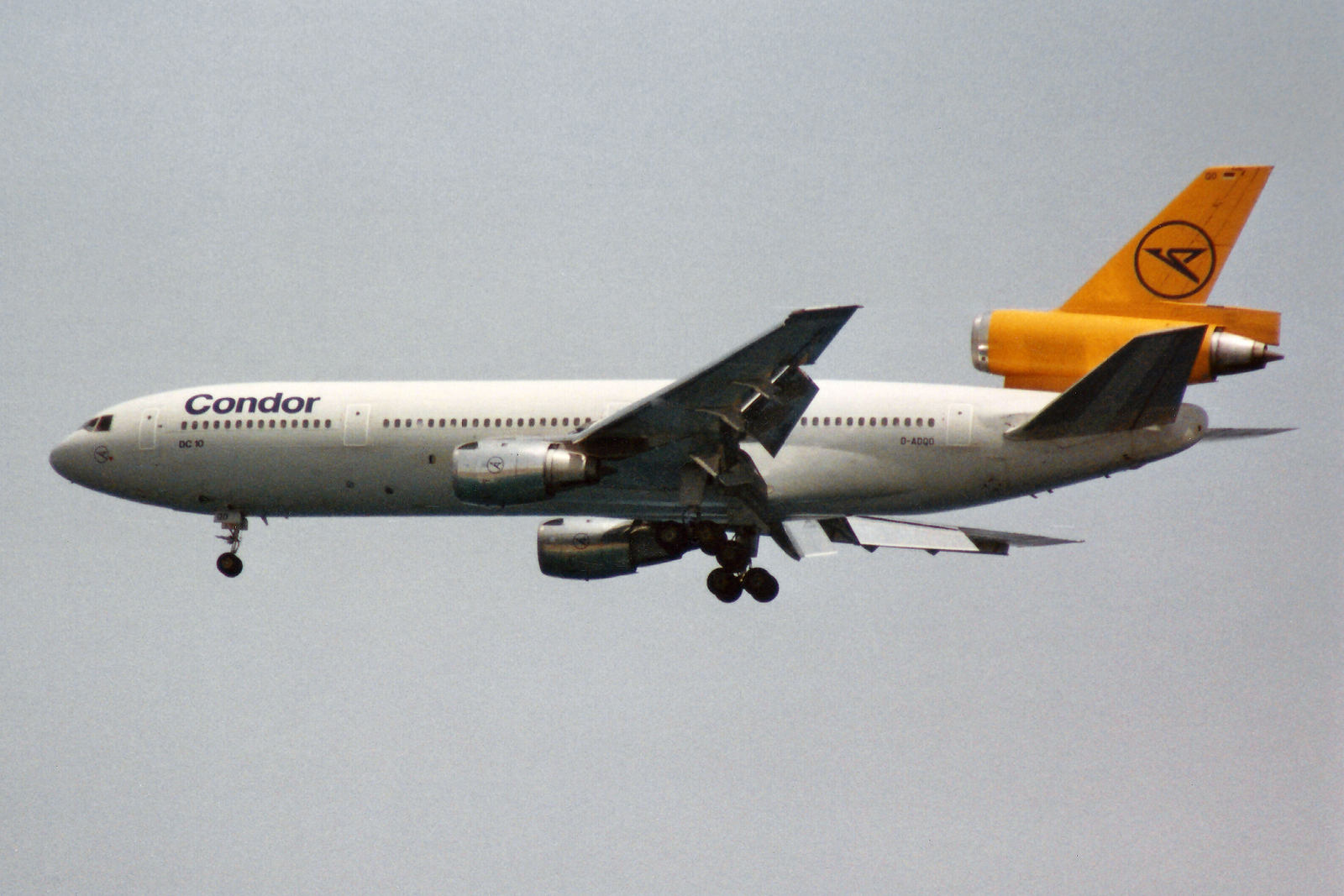
Condor McDonnell Douglas DC-10 in 1990

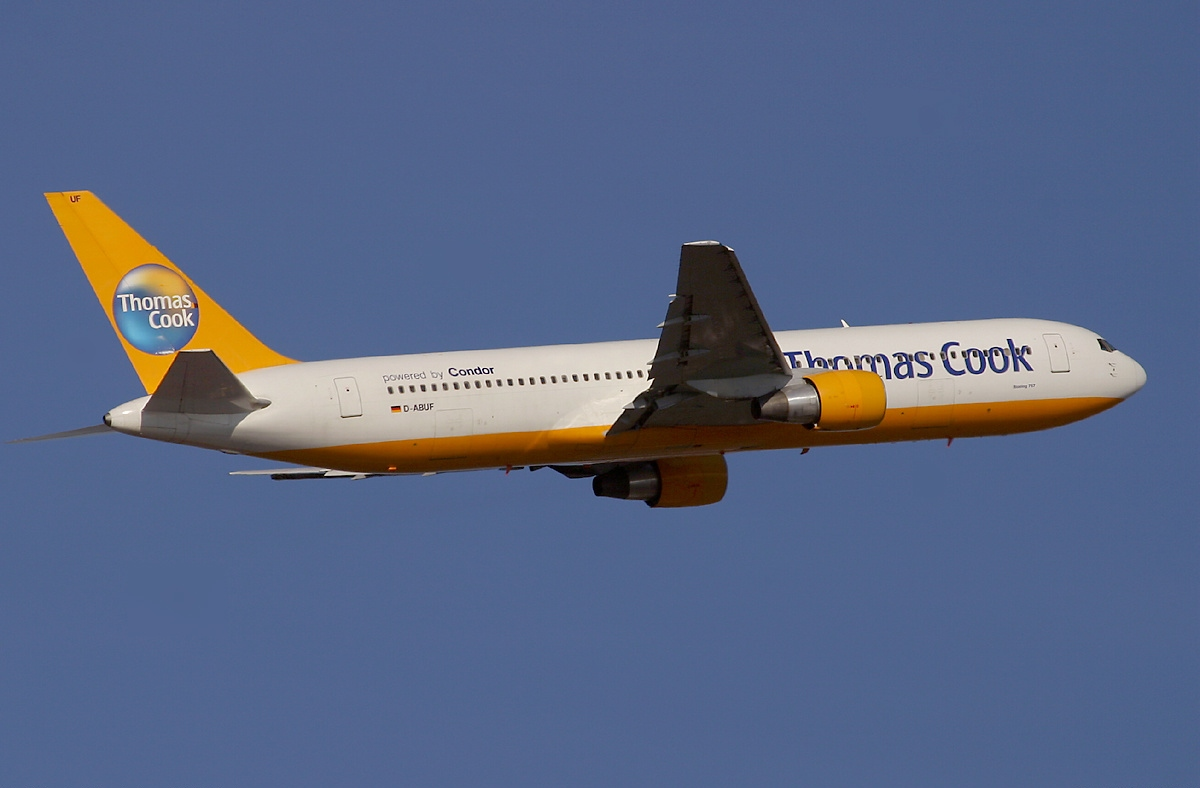
Condor Boeing 767-300ER in 2003, featuring the Thomas Cook powered by Condor livery and titles that were introduced in the 1990s.

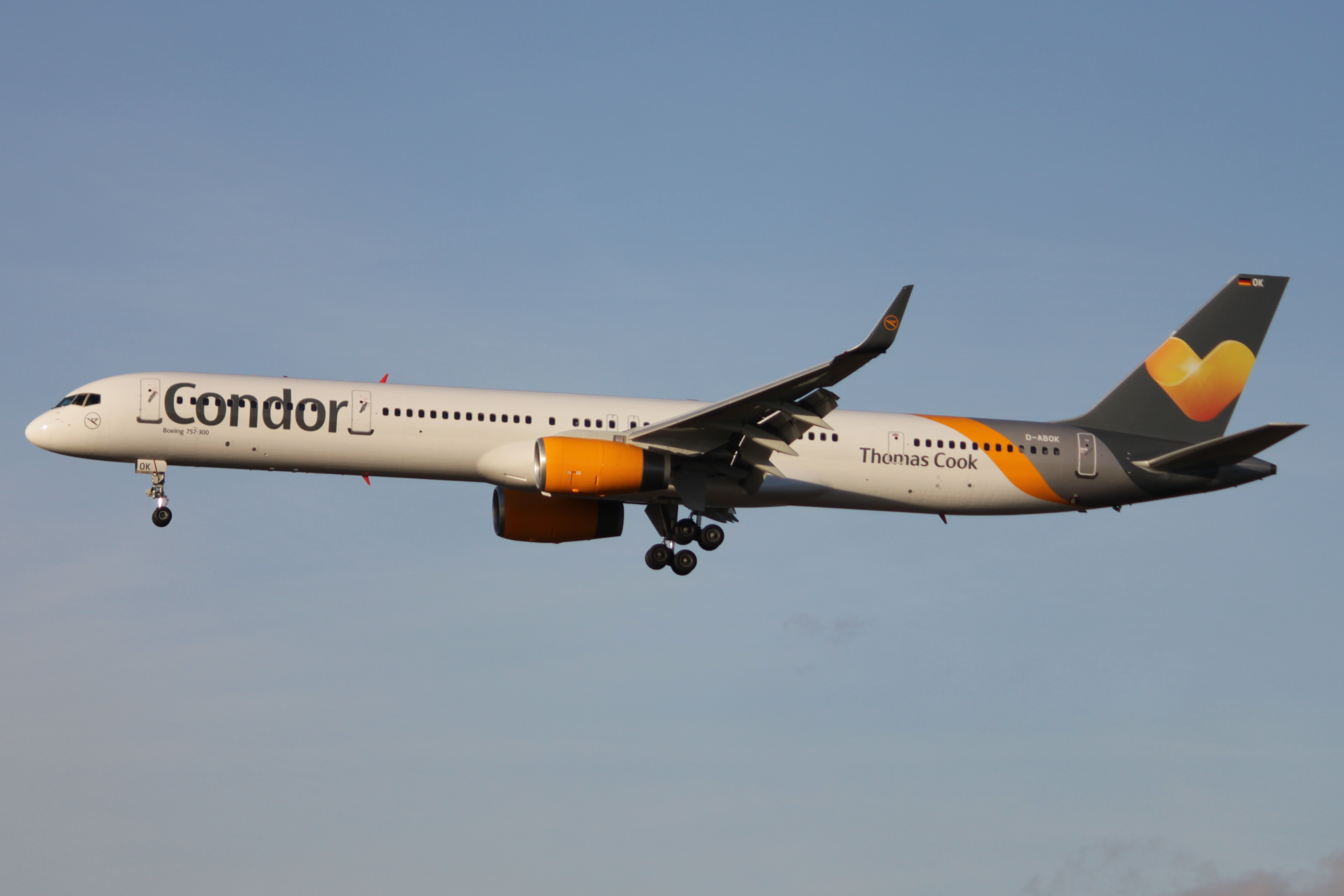
Boeing 757-300 wearing the former Thomas Cook branded livery. The depicted tailfin logo would be replaced with Condor's own signage following the split from Thomas Cook.

=== 1955–1979: Establishment and early years ===
Condor was founded on 21 December 1955 as Deutsche Flugdienst GmbH. Its initial ownership was divided between the German shipping company Norddeutscher Lloyd (27.75%), trans-Atlantic shipping firm Hamburg America Line (27.75%), German flag carrier Deutsche Lufthansa (26%), and railway company Deutsche Bundesbahn (18.5%). Deutsche Flugdienst's initial fleet consisted of three 36-passenger Vickers VC.1 Viking aircraft; they were based at Frankfurt Airport, which was also a prominent Lufthansa hub at that time. On 29 March 1956, the airline's first tourist-oriented flight commenced, a pilgrimage flight to the Holy Land. Within its first year of operation, destinations such as Mallorca and the Canary Islands were added to the airline's flight schedule.

Between 1959 and 1960, Lufthansa bought out the other shareholdings, acquiring sole ownership of Deutsche Flugdienst. In October 1961, Deutsche Flugdienst took over its rival Condor Luftreederei (which had been founded in September 1957 by Oetker and activated in July of the following year), subsequently changing its name to Condor Flugdienst GmbH, thus introducing the Condo name inside of Lufthansa. During the following year, Condor Flugdienst GmbH had a 63.3% market share of Germany's tourism air travel market, transporting a total of 66,000 passengers in that year; Mallorca was by far the most popular destination, attracting 36,000 tourists.

The following decade was an era of considerable growth for Condor. During 1966, the company launched its first long-haul flights, reaching destinations such as Thailand, Sri Lanka, Kenya and the Dominican Republic. In 1971, Condor became the first leisure-oriented airline in the world to adopt the Boeing 747, which was the world's biggest aircraft during the era. By 1973, Condor's fleet consisted of a total of 14 Boeing airliners: Two Boeing 747s, two Boeing 707s and ten Boeing 727s.

=== 1980–1999: Expansion and restructuring ===
During 1989, the firm launched "Condor Flüge Individuell" (later known as Condor Individuell); this venture leveraged its individual seat business to sell airline seats to members of the public directly. According to a Condor spokesman, the airline was selling around 15% of its tickets itself. During the early 1990s, production company Südflug, a wholly owned subsidiary of Condor, was integrated into the airline. This change brought both the Boeing 757 and Boeing 767 jetliners into Condor's service; being configured with two-class cabins, Condor became the first tourism airline to introduce a separate, more comfortable class upon its aircraft.

During 1995, Condor expanded its shareholdings in other ventures. Condor-Touristik-Verbund held a 30% stake in alpha Holding GmbH, 37.5% of the shares in Kreutzer Touristik GmbH, wholly owned Fischer Reisen GmbH, and a 10% stake in Öger Tours GmbH. The airline also assumed ownership of the 40% stake held by parent airline Lufthansa in SunExpress, a Turkish charter airline; its ownership of the firm would subsequently be extended to 50%.

1996 was Condor Flugdienst GmbH's 40th anniversary; to mark the occasion, American artist James Rizzi redecorated a Boeing 757 as a flying work of art, which was sometimes referred to as the Rizzi-Bird. In the latter half of that year, the company became the launch customer for the Boeing 757-300, having placed twelve firm orders for the variant. To increase operational flexibility, Condor frequently trained its pilots so that they could operate both the Boeing 757 and 767 without any restrictions.

During 1998, the airline established Condor Berlin GmbH, a wholly owned subsidiary headquartered at Berlin Schönefeld Airport. This new entity was a low-cost carrier intended to compete with rivals such as Aero Lloyd and Air Berlin; Condor estimated that its subsidiary's costs ought to be about 20% lower than the parent company's own. That same year, Condor placed orders for six Airbus A320-200 airliners, the most technologically modern short-haul aircraft in the world at that time; that airline would subsequently operate twelve aircraft of the type in its fleet.

The late 1990s was dominated by industrial consolidation efforts. Condor's parent airline, Lufthansa, opted to break ties with Hapag-Lloyd to link up with German retailer Karstadt and NUR, its tour operator; this led to the creation of the jointly owned C&N Touristik, bringing together Germany's largest holiday airline with tour operations. Thus, Condor became an integrated tourism concern.

=== 2000–2009: Transition to Thomas Cook ownership ===
From 2000 onwards, the Condor shares held by Lufthansa were gradually acquired by both Thomas Cook AG and Thomas Cook Group. The process of transforming Condor from a Lufthansa subsidiary to a part of Thomas Cook (along with Thomas Cook Airlines, Thomas Cook Airlines Belgium and Thomas Cook Airlines Scandinavia began with the rebranding as Thomas Cook powered by Condor on 1 March 2003. A new livery was introduced, featuring the Thomas Cook logo on the aircraft tail and the word "Condor" written in the font used by Thomas Cook Airlines. On 23 January 2004, Condor became part of Thomas Cook AG and returned to the Condor brand name. By December 2006, the remaining Lufthansa shares only amounted to 24.9 percent.

On 20 September 2007, shortly after having taken over LTU International, Air Berlin announced its intention to acquire Condor in a share swap deal. It was intended to buy the 75.1 percent of Condor shares held by Thomas Cook, with the remaining Lufthansa assets being acquired in 2010. In return, Thomas Cook would take up 29.99 percent of the Air Berlin stock. However, on 11 September 2008, this plan was abandoned.

=== 2010–2020: Rise and fall of Thomas Cook Group Airlines ===
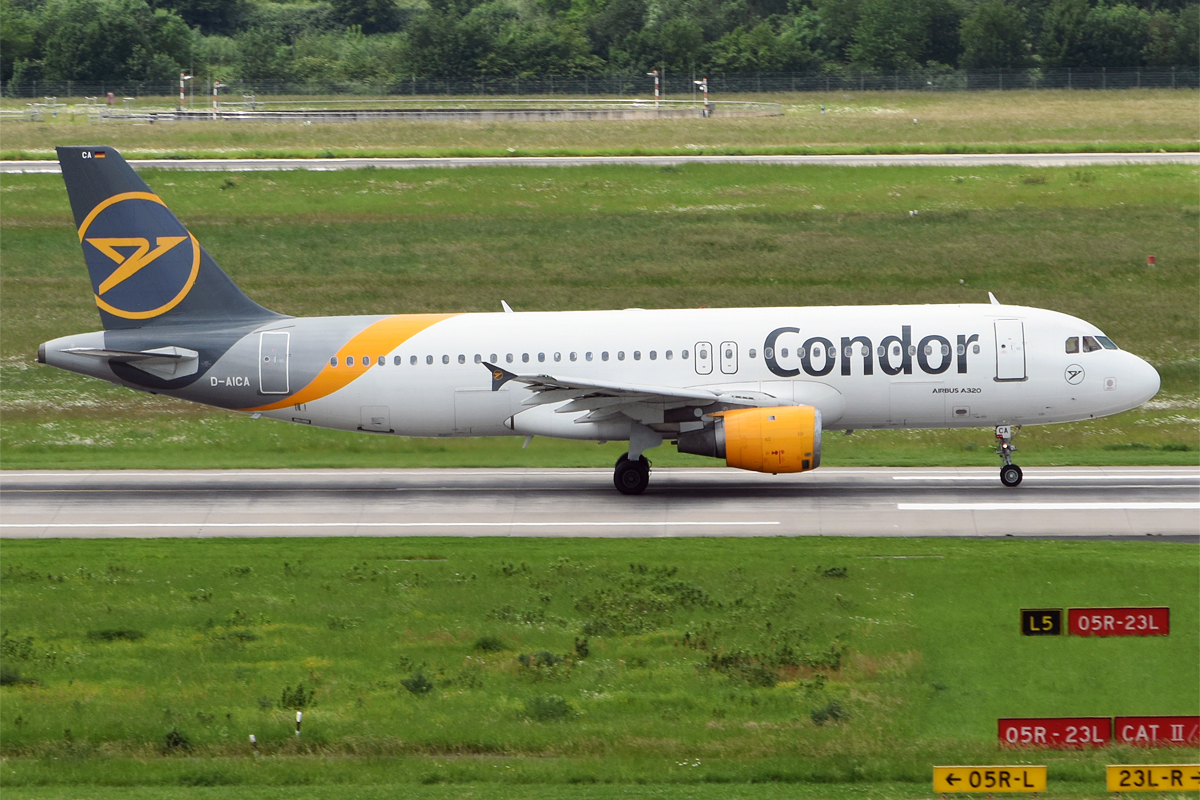
A Condor Airbus A320 in its transition livery, with the Thomas Cook logo removed

In December 2010, Thomas Cook Group chose the Airbus A320 family as preferred short-medium haul aircraft type for its airlines, with a review concerning the long-haul aircraft scheduled for 2011.

On 17 September 2012, the airline signed a codeshare agreement with the Mexican low-cost carrier, Volaris. On 12 March 2013, Condor and the Canadian airline WestJet agreed on an interline partnership which will offer customers connecting flights to/from 17 destinations in Canada. This agreement expands the network of both airlines, allowing passengers to connect beyond each airline's own network.

On 4 February 2013, the Thomas Cook Group announced that Thomas Cook Airlines, Thomas Cook Airlines Belgium, and Condor would merge into a single operating segment of the Thomas Cook Group, Thomas Cook Group Airlines. On 1 October 2013, the Thomas Cook Group began presenting itself under the new unified brand symbol. The aircraft of the Thomas Cook Group Airlines also had the new logo: the Sunny Heart added to their tails and were re-painted in the new corporate color scheme grey, white, and yellow. On the aircraft, the Sunny Heart on the tail is meant to symbolize the unification of airline brands and tour operators within the entire Thomas Cook Group.

Condor refurbished the cabins on all of its Boeing 767-300 long-haul aircraft. All economy class and premium economy class seats were replaced with new seats from ZIM Flugsitz GmbH. Condor kept its successful Premium Economy Class with more legroom and added services. The new Business Class seats (Zodiac Aerospace) offer fully automated, angled-lie-flat seats capable of inclining to an angle of 170 degrees with a bed length of 1.80 metres (5 ft 11 in). The airline added seats in its new Business Class section from 18 to 30 seats on three of its Boeing 767 aircraft. New in-flight entertainment includes personal screens for all passengers throughout all three classes of service. Condor will implement the RAVE IFE technology of Zodiac In-flight Entertainment. On 27 June 2014, Condor completed the cabin refurbishment for all of its long-haul Boeing 767 aircraft.

In early 2017, Condor's CEO Ralf Teckentrup introduced a plan to cut operating costs by €40 million, because of the €14 million operating cost loss and the €1.4 billion revenue drop. The passenger numbers also dropped by 6%. Condor had also planned new routes to the United States for San Diego, New Orleans, and Pittsburgh; all flights are operated by the 767-300ER.

On 25 September 2019, Condor secured additional credit facilities of €380 million to keep flying, despite the collapse of Thomas Cook Group. On the same day, a Frankfurt court authorised investor protection measures to allow Condor to be restructured. On 1 December 2019, the Frankfurt district formally opened these proceedings under the "Schutzschirmverfahren" (protective shield proceedings) clause with the liquidator, Lucas Flöther, requesting creditors to register their claims with him by 8 January 2020.

On 24 January 2020, Condor announced that PGL Polish Aviation Group would be buying Condor and the deal was expected to close in April 2020 once antitrust approvals are obtained. With this deal, PGL was expected to repay the bridge loan from Germany in full. Condor would have continued to operate under their current brand and management. However, on 2 April 2020 it was announced that the sale to LOT Polish Airlines had fallen through.

=== 2021–present ===
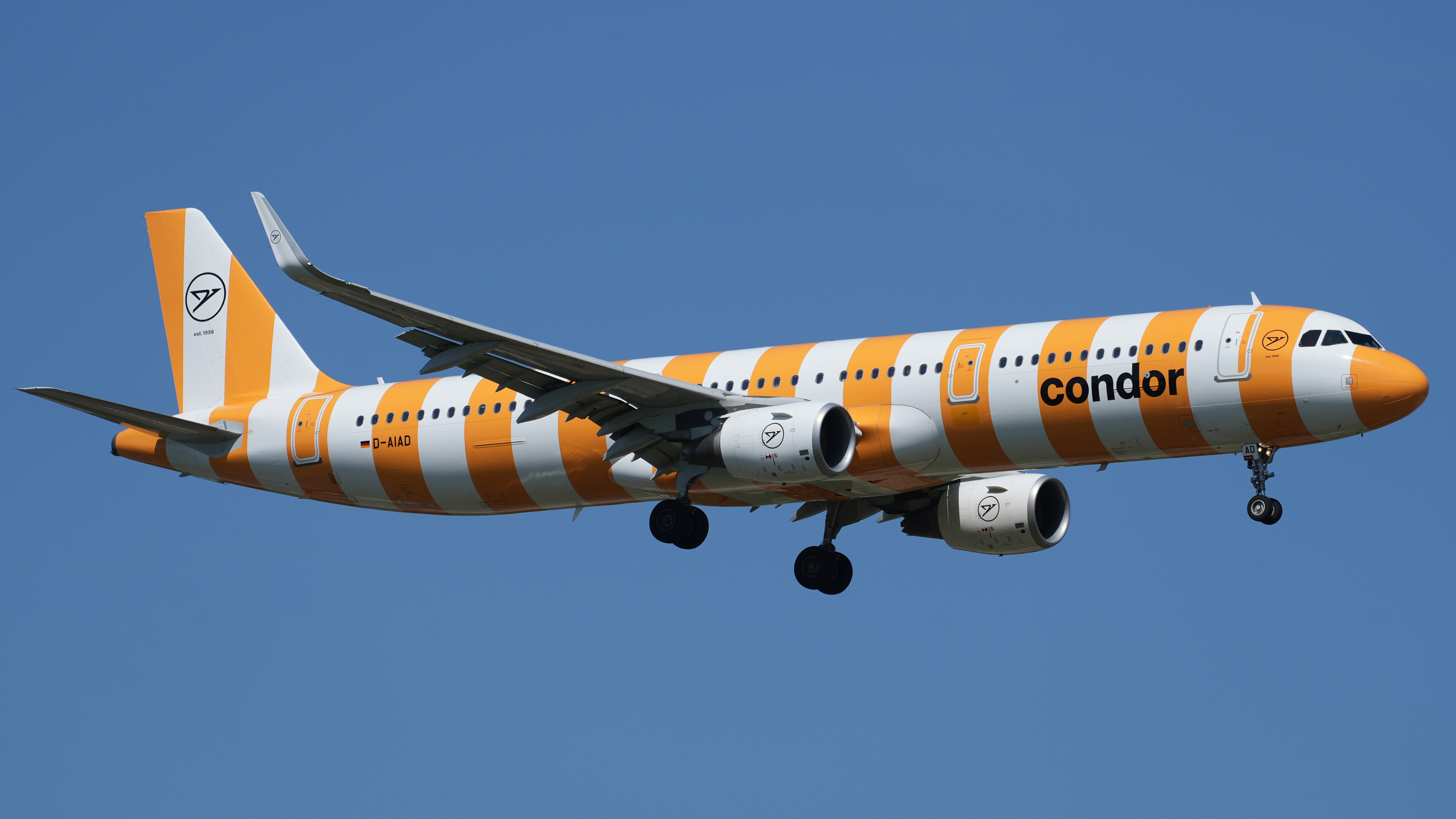
The first Condor Airbus A321 to feature the new livery in 2022

On 20 May 2021, Attestor Capital acquired 51% of the airline and announced that it would provide €200 million of equity capital and a further €250 million to modernise Condor's long-haul fleet. In July 2021, the European Commission approved a €525.3 million aid package offered by the German government. On 28 July 2021, the airline announced an order of 16 Airbus A330-900 to replace its current fleet of Boeing 767-300ER. The order was later expanded to 18 aircraft, and then again to 21 aircraft.

In April 2022, Condor announced a major change to its corporate design including a revised logo and an entirely new aircraft livery composed of distinctive stripes encircling the fuselage with one of five colors that alternate with white (the stripes being yellow, red, blue, green, or beige), replacing the former Thomas Cook design. On 25 July 2022, the airline announced an order of 13 Airbus A320neo and 28 Airbus A321neo to replace its existing fleet of Airbus A320s and Boeing 757-300. On 19 December 2022, Condor received its first of overall 21 Airbus A330-900 in Frankfurt to renew its entire long-haul fleet. The aircraft's first revenue flight took off on 27 December to Mauritius. The second aircraft followed only a few days later on 30 December 2022.

In December 2024, Condor announced it would terminate all flights to destinations in Cuba (to Havana, Varadero and Holguin) in 2025, citing receding demand while issues with the local infrastructure had increased in recent years. Shortly after, Condor also announced it would terminate flights to six of its North American destinations (San Antonio, Phoenix, Baltimore, Minneapolis, Halifax and Edmonton).

In October 2025, Condor announced the closure of their base at Leipzig/Halle Airport with immediate effect, handing over a downsized network to sister carrier Marabu.

In November 2025, Condor retired its last Boeing 757, bringing to an end 35 years of it operating Boeing aircraft.

In April 2026, Condor began wet-leasing two Embraer E190 aircraft from Swiss carrier Helvetic Airways to support its city network operations.

In July 2026, Attestor exercised an option to acquire the German government's remaining 49 percent stake in Condor by 30 September 2026, which gave it full ownership of the airline. Attestor was also considering subsequently selling a minority stake to a strategic airline partner.

== Destinations ==
Countries and dependencies in which Condor operates (January 2026)

=== Network developments ===
In summer 2025, Condor expanded its European city network from Frankfurt to include Rome, Milan, Prague, Vienna, Zurich, Berlin, Hamburg, and Munich.

The airline also launched new short-haul leisure routes from Vienna to Rhodes, Kos, and Palma de Mallorca.

On the long-haul side, frequencies to Miami and Mauritius were increased, Johannesburg and Bangkok became permanent routes, and Panama City was added as a new destination.

During the 2024/25 season, Condor reported operating over 2,500 flights on newly introduced routes, carrying more than 100,000 passengers, with an on-time performance rate of 88%.

=== Withdrawn routes ===
Following a German Federal Court of Justice ruling in 2024 that ended Condor's feeder agreement with Lufthansa, the airline discontinued several transatlantic routes. Services to San Antonio, Baltimore, Minneapolis, Phoenix, Edmonton, and Halifax were withdrawn for the 2025 summer schedule.

=== Codeshare agreements ===
Condor has Codeshare agreements with the following companies:

- Alaska Airlines/Hawaiian Airlines
- Deutsche Bahn
- Emirates
- Etihad Airways
- Marabu
- TAROM
- WestJet

=== Interline agreements ===
- Air Dolomiti
- Air North
- airBaltic
- Alaska Airlines
- American Airlines
- Austrian Airlines
- BahamasAir
- Copa Airlines
- Emirates
- Flydubai
- Gol Transportes Aéreos
- JetBlue
- LOT Polish Airlines
- Lufthansa
- Malaysia Airlines
- Southwest Airlines
- Sun Country Airlines
- Swiss International Air Lines
- Volaris
- WestJet

== Corporate affairs ==
=== Headquarters ===
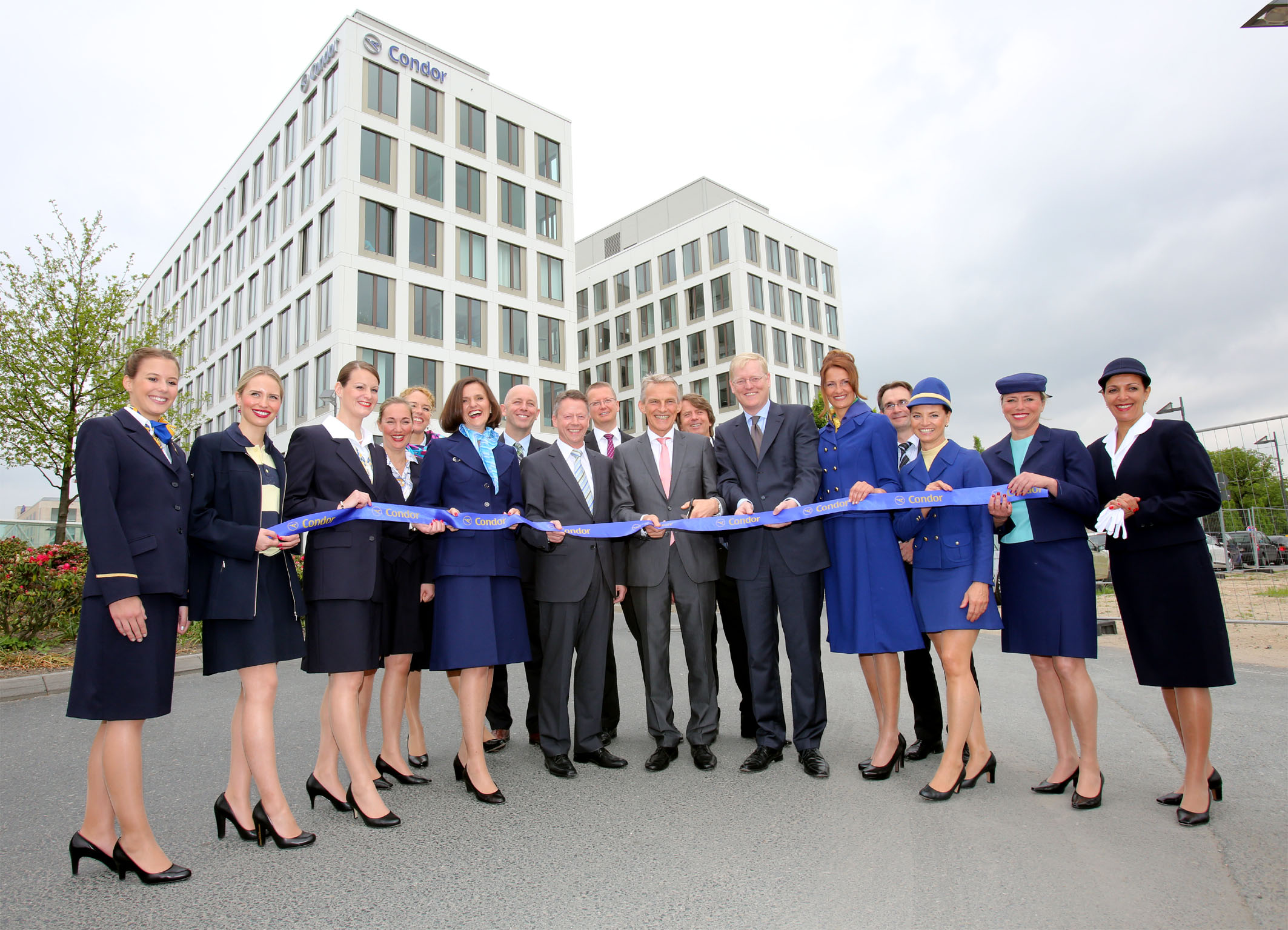
The former head office near Frankfurt Airport at its inauguration in 2012. The flight attendants are wearing uniforms from different generations for the occasion.

Condor has been headquartered in Gateway Gardens, Frankfurt, since March 2026. It was previously headquartered in Kelsterbach, Frankfurt and later Neu-Isenburg.

In January 2010, the airline broke ground on their then new headquarters in Gateway Gardens, an office complex in Flughafen, Frankfurt, across the Bundesautobahn 3 from Frankfurt Airport. 380 ground employees worked in the building, and pre-flight briefings for about 2,000 flight attendants were held in the building. Prior to its redevelopment, the land housed families stationed at a U.S. military base. Groß & Partner and OFB Projektentwicklung developed the seven-floor facility. The 14,600-square-metre (157,000 sq ft) building is situated between the park and the central plaza, in the "Quartier Mondo" area of Gateway Gardens. It housed Condor's corporate headquarters, a training and education center with a flight simulator, and the airline's flight operations facility. 2,700 square metres (29,000 sq ft) of the facility included small units rented to other tenants and a café and restaurant on the building's first floor. The building opened in the spring of 2012. However, Condor left the complex in 2020 and rented cheaper offices in nearby Neu-Isenburg.

In May 2025, Condor announced it would return to Gateway Gardens, renting ten floors. The airline relocated to the Alpha Rotex building in March 2026, with approximately 800 to 900 employees working at the new headquarters.

The Alpha Rotex building, formerly occupied by DB Schenker, is located at the western end of Gateway Gardens—a move intended to enhance operational synergy by bringing administrative staff closer to Frankfurt Airport and its crews.

=== Subsidiaries ===
==== Condor Berlin ====
At the beginning of 1998, Condor founded Condor Berlin GmbH (CIB), a wholly owned subsidiary headquartered in Berlin-Schönefeld. It used the ICAO code CIB and operated on short and medium-haul routes with its Airbus A320-200 until its integration into the parent company on 1 May 2013.

==== InterCondor ====
InterCondor was a planned joint venture between then West-German Condor and East-German Interflug that was set to start operations in 1990 with Boeing 757s. However, it was abandoned because of Interflug ending operations in 1991.

=== ACMI arrangements ===
Condor had five ACMI arrangements in 2025. As of the summer season of 2025, Fly Air41 Airways operates four aircraft for Condor, of which two Airbus A319 are based in Frankfurt and two Airbus A320 are based in Düsseldorf. It has been cooperating with Condor since the summer 2023 season. Fly Air41's destinations under Condor's flight number include destinations along the coastline of the Mediterranean Sea, Armenia, Canary Islands and Madeira. Heston Airlines has cooperated with Condor since 2022, and is operating the same aircraft type as Fly Air41 Airways. Other airlines that Condor cooperates with are Marabu (since 2023), European Air Charter (since 2020) and Bulgaria Air (since 2022).

== Fleet ==
The airline operates an All-Airbus fleet consisting of the A320-200, A320neo, A321-200, A321neo and A330-900.

Condor received its first A330-900 in late 2022.

=== Current fleet ===
As of July 2026, Condor operates the following aircraft:

Aircraft	In service	Orders	Passengers					Notes
Aircraft	In service	Orders	C	P	Y	Total	Refs	Notes
Airbus A320-200	9	—	24	—	156	180		To be retired and replaced by Airbus A320neo.
Airbus A320neo	7	9	24	—	156	180		Two additional units ordered December 2023.
Airbus A321-200	12	—	24	—	186	210		To be retired and replaced by Airbus A321neo.
Airbus A321-200	12	—	24	—	196	220		To be retired and replaced by Airbus A321neo.
Airbus A321neo	9	23	24	—	209	233		Four additional units ordered December 2023.
Airbus A330-900	18	7	30	64	216	310		Order with 4 options. Deliveries scheduled until 2031. Order expanded three times to 25 aircraft overall.
Total	55	39						

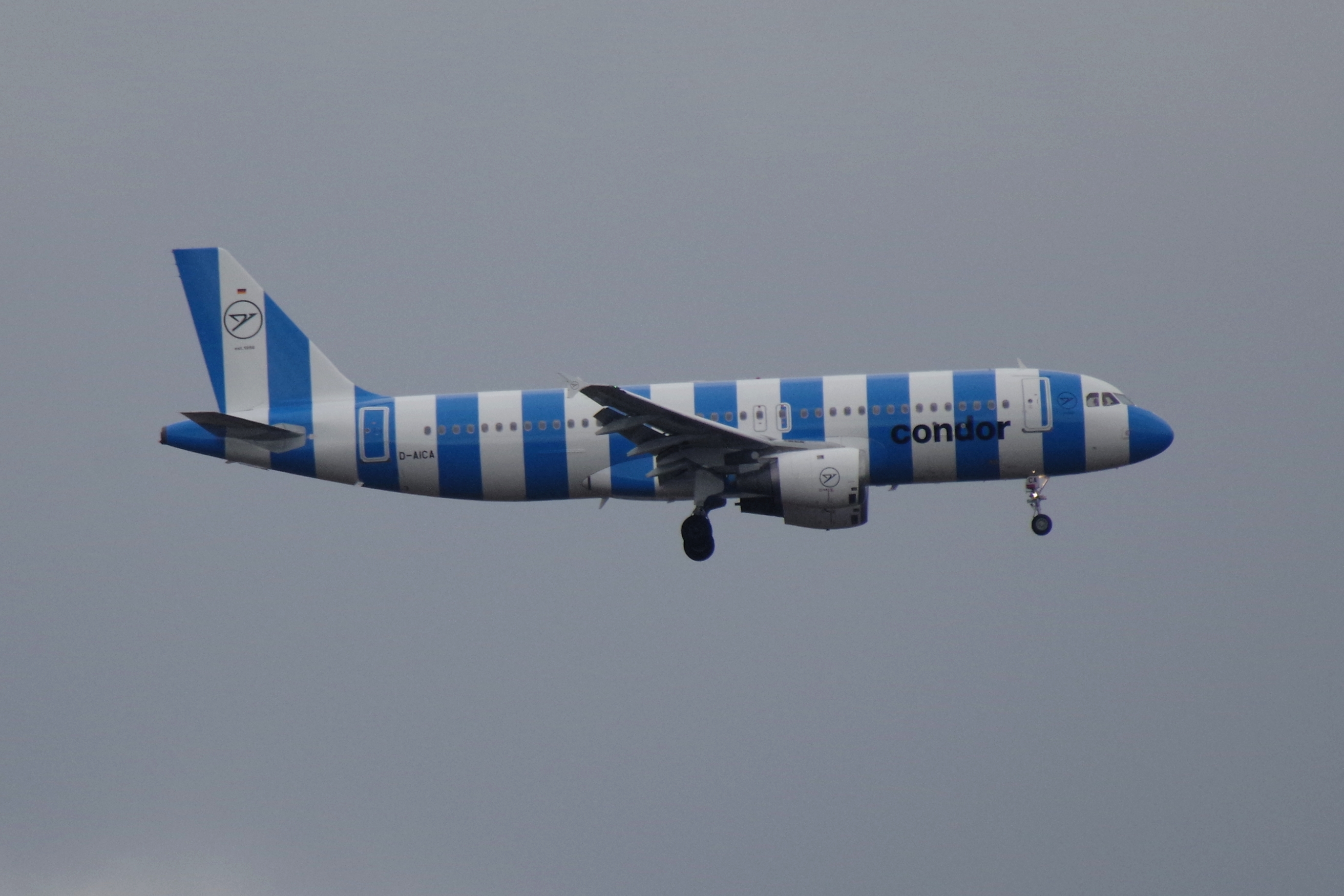
Condor Airbus A320-200

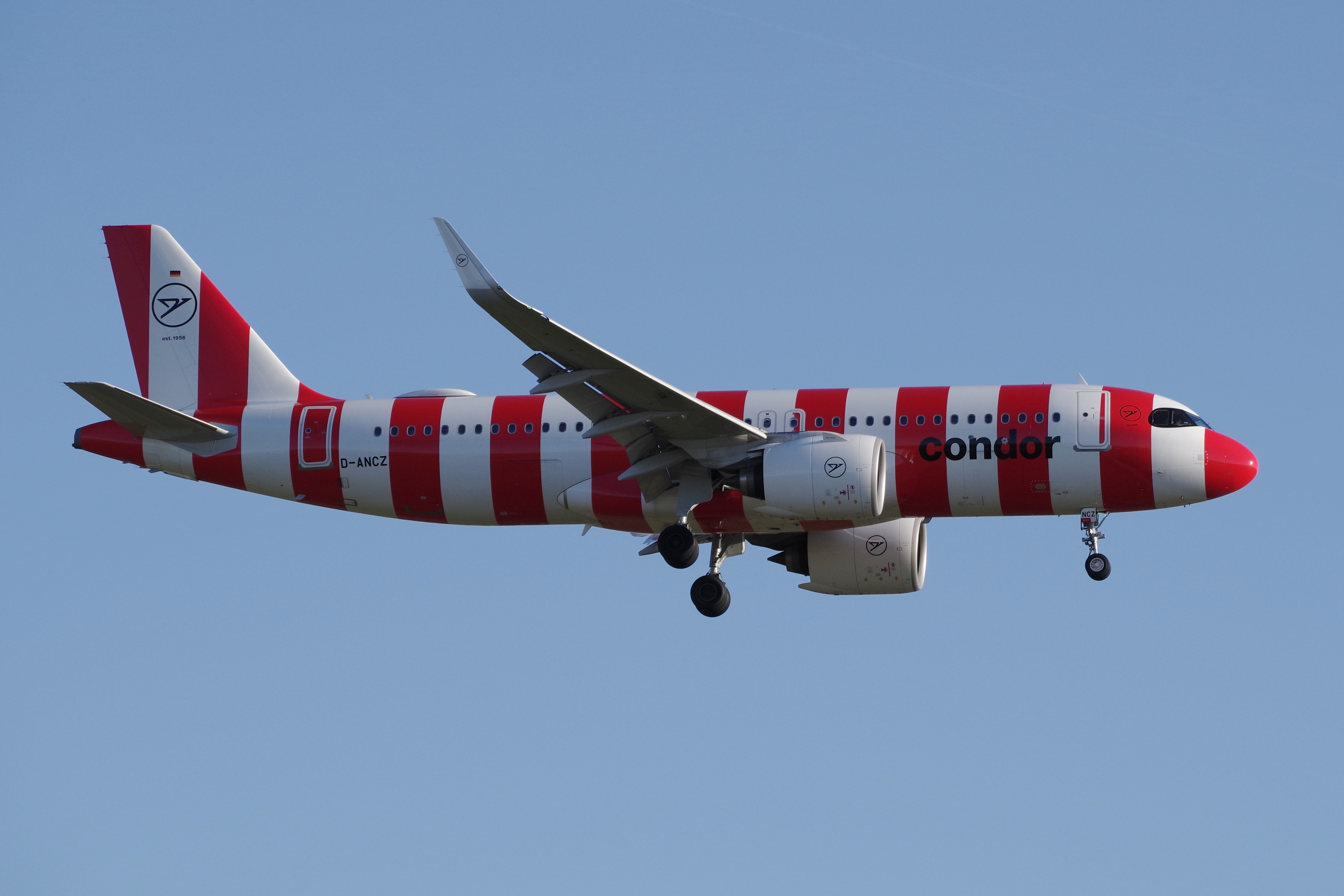
Condor Airbus A320neo

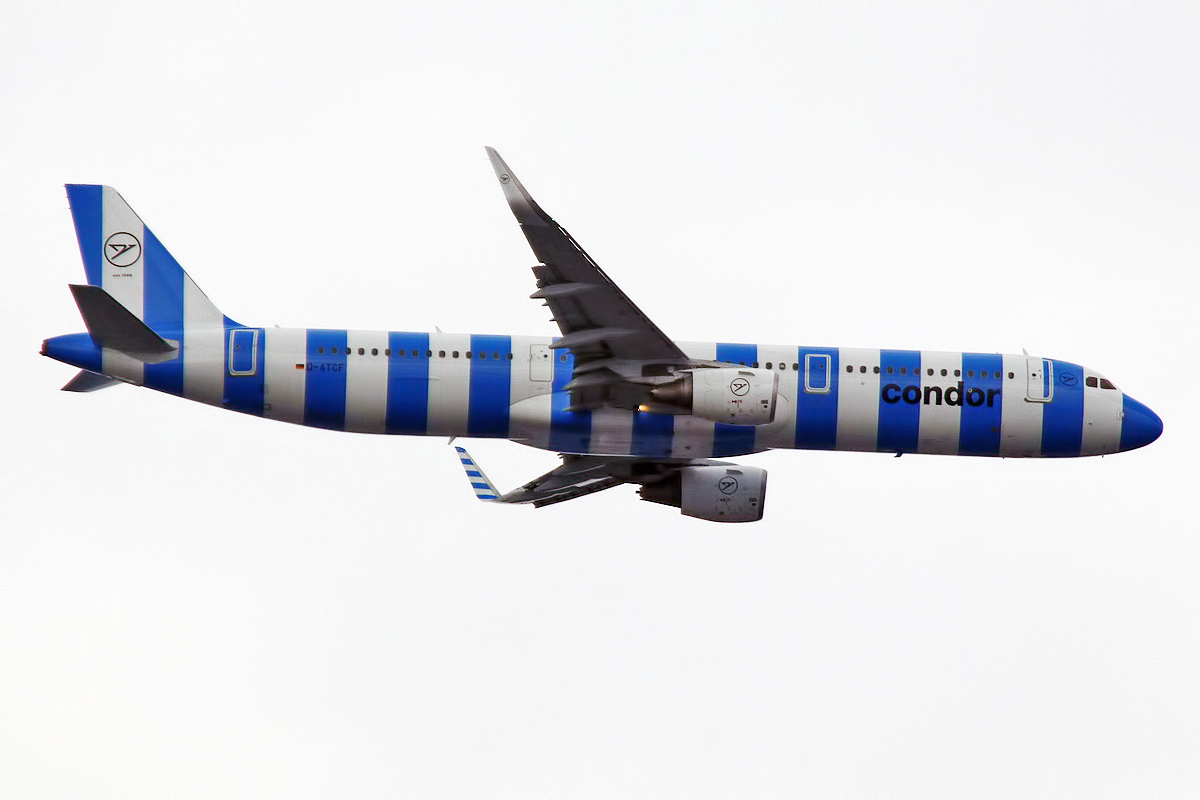
Condor Airbus A321-200

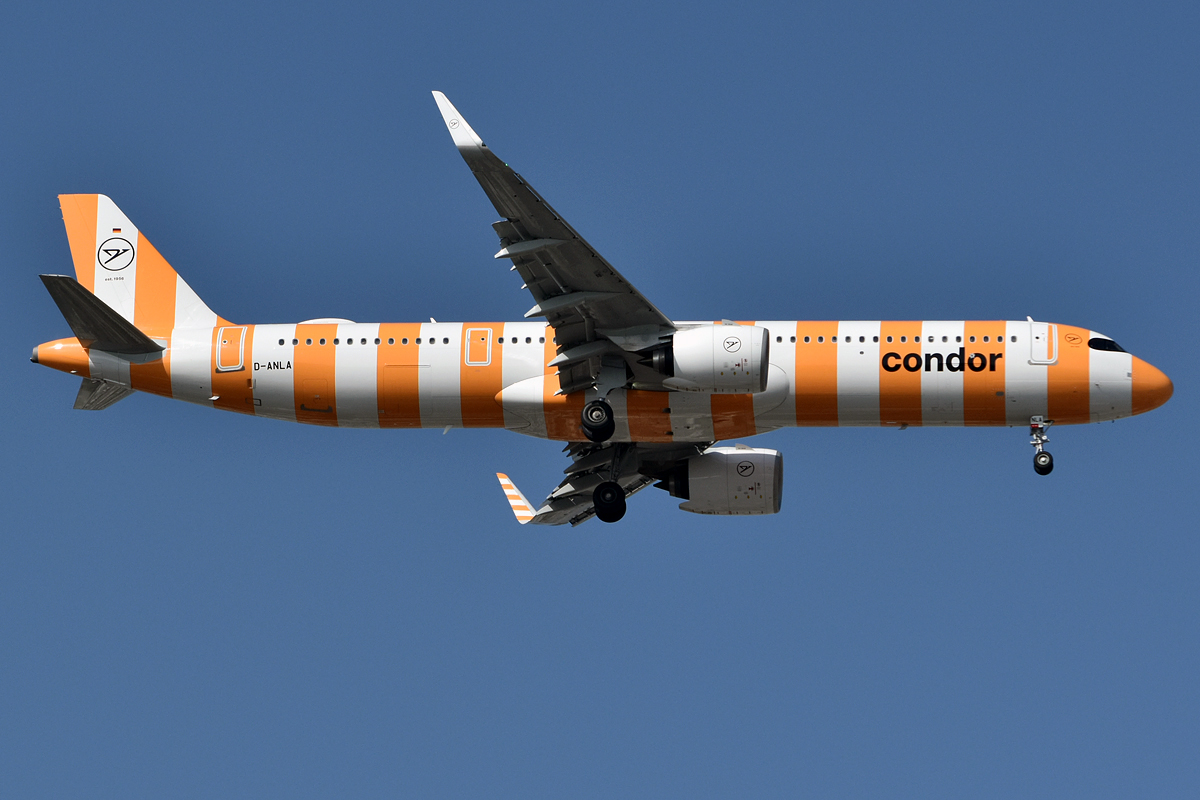
Condor Airbus A321neo

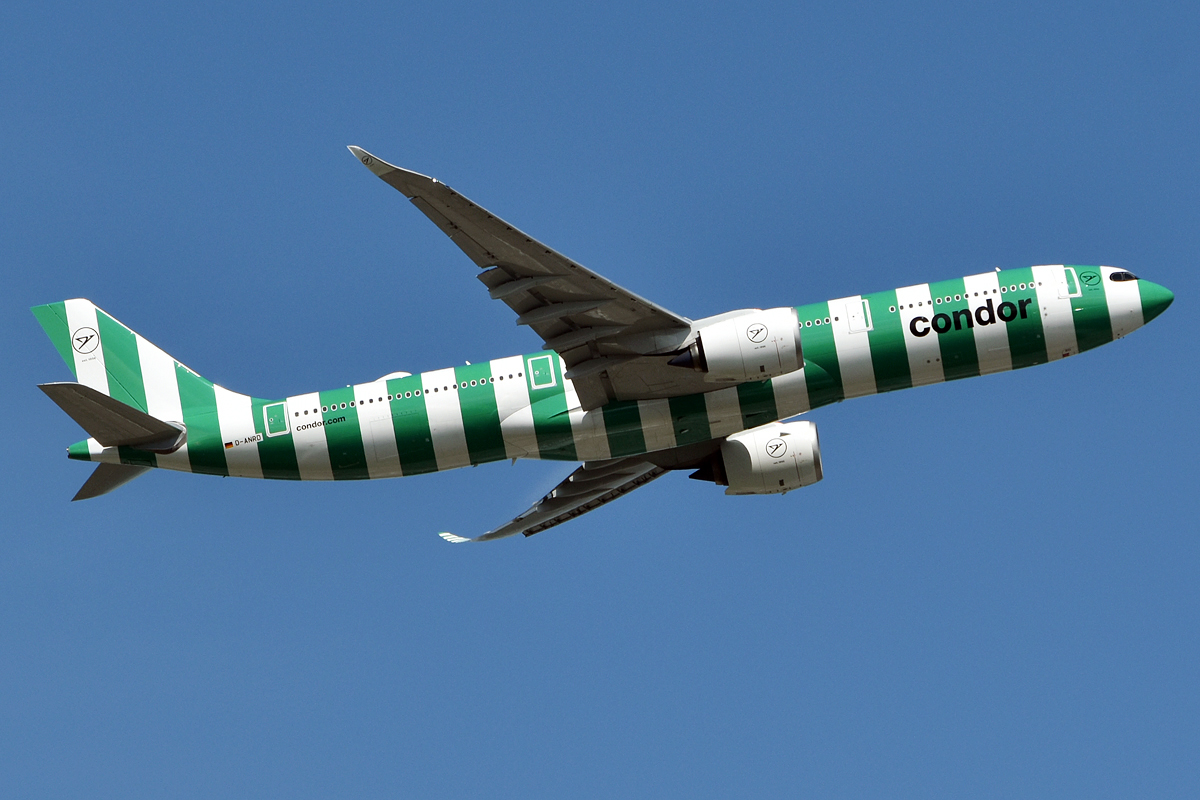
Condor Airbus A330-900

=== Former fleet ===
As of November 2025, Condor operated 10 Airbus A320, 3 Airbus A320neo, 13 Airbus A321, 6 Airbus A321neo and 18 Airbus A330-900neo

Over the years, Condor operated the following aircraft types:

Aircraft	Total	Introduced	Retired	Notes
Airbus A300B4	9	1979	1988	
Airbus A310-200	3	1985	1991	
Airbus A310-300	2	1987	1999	
Airbus A319-100	1	2011	2011	Leased from Hamburg Airways
Airbus A330-200	1	2017	2018	Leased from Air Transat
Airbus A330-200	3	2018	2019	Operated by Thomas Cook Airlines
Airbus A330-200	1	2019	2020	Leased from AirTanker
Airbus A330-200	4	2022	2024	Leased in preparation of Airbus A330neo deliveries.
Airbus A330-300	2	2022	2023	Operated by SmartLynx Airlines Malta
Beechcraft 65	4	1964	1966	
Boeing 707-320B	5	1967	1981	
Boeing 707-320C	1	1977	1979	
Boeing 707-420	1	1975	1976	
Boeing 727-100	7	1966	1982	
Boeing 727-200	8	1973	1989	
Boeing 737-100	3	1969	1971	Leased from Lufthansa
Boeing 737-200	4	1981	1988	
Boeing 737-300	9	1987	1998	
Boeing 747-200B	2	1971	1979	Condor was the first leisure airline worldwide to operate the 747 (one later crashed while operating as KAL 007).
Boeing 747-200M	1	1979	1980	Leased from Lufthansa
Boeing 747-400M	1	1993	1996	Leased from Lufthansa to operate the Taipei route.
Boeing 757-200	20	1990	2006	
Boeing 757-300	15	1999	2025	Launch customer. Retired on 5 November 2025 from Vienna to Frankfurt.
Boeing 767-300ER	16	1991	2024	Last commercial flight on 12 March 2024.
British Aerospace 125	2	1967	1971	Leased from and operated by Conti-Flug.
Convair CV-240	3	1961	1962	
Douglas DC-8-33	1	1968	1969	Taken over from Südflug by Lufthansa and transferred to Condor.
Douglas DC-8-73CF	1	1985	1986	
Lockheed L-1049G Super Constellation	5	1964	1964	
Lockheed L-1649A Starliner	2	1960	1962	
McDonnell Douglas DC-10-30	5	1979	1999	
Fokker F27 Friendship	2	1965	1968	
Vickers Viking	3	1956	1964	
Vickers Viscount	4	1962	1969	

=== Special liveries ===
A330neo with "island" green stripes, off Zanzibar

In 2022, Condor airlines introduced candy-striped livery to emphasis its sea-side destinations. There are five variants with different connotations: blue stripes for the sea, yellow for sunshine, red for passion, green for island and beige-gold stripes for a sandy beach.

Over the years, Condor has fitted a few of its aircraft with dedicated special liveries:

- An Airbus A330-900 has been painted with "danke, tecke" (for the former CEO of Condor, Ralf Teckentrup) instead of the normal "condor" titles.
- In 2024, Condor painted an Airbus A320-200 with pink stripes in support of breast cancer awareness month.
- An Airbus A320-200, registered D-AICA, formerly wore a retro livery in the style of the 1960s. It was named Hans after Hans Geisler, the owner of the first travel agency Condor ever received a contract from in 1956.
- An Airbus A320–200, registered D-ASGE, was re-painted in an Eintracht Frankfurt livery in 2025. The livery features black stripes, with Eintracht's badge in red on the tail. The D-ASGE registration references Eintracht's Sportgemeinde Eintracht nickname, with "SGE" titles also painted on either side of the fuselage.
- A Boeing 757-300, registered D-ABON, was painted in a colorful special livery named Willi. This aircraft had been christened after the airline's former CEO, Wilfried Meyer and was phased out in October 2025.
- A since phased-out Boeing 757-200, registered D-ABNF, formerly wore a livery with sketches by James Rizzi, commemorating the airline's 40-year anniversary.
- A former Boeing 767-300ER, registered D-ABUM and retired in 2022, wore a retro livery in the style of the 1970s.
- Another former Boeing 767-300ER, registered D-ABUE, wore a special children's charity livery consisting of Janosch characters.

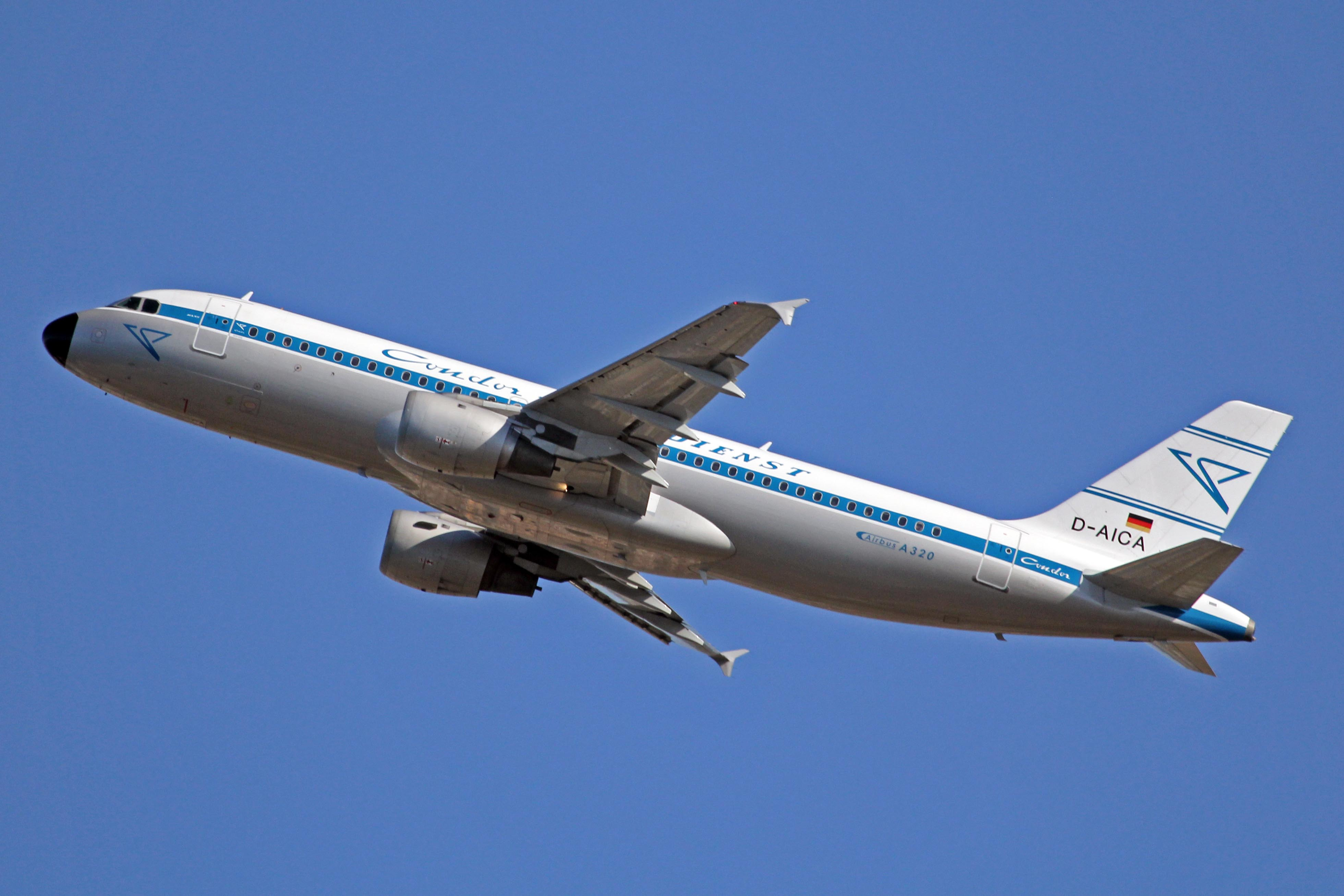
Airbus A320-200 in a special retro livery named Hans

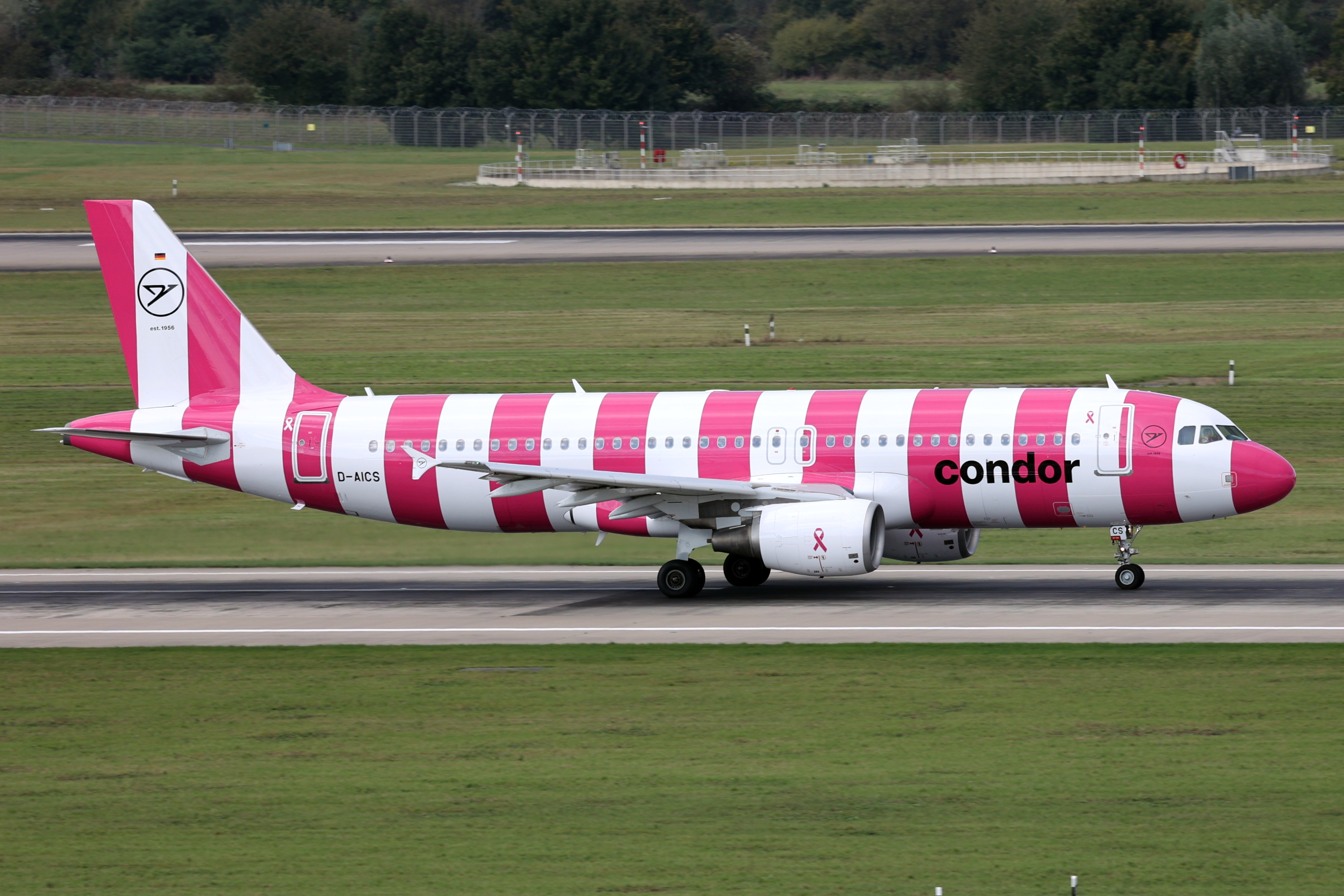
Airbus A320-200 in a special breast cancer awareness month livery

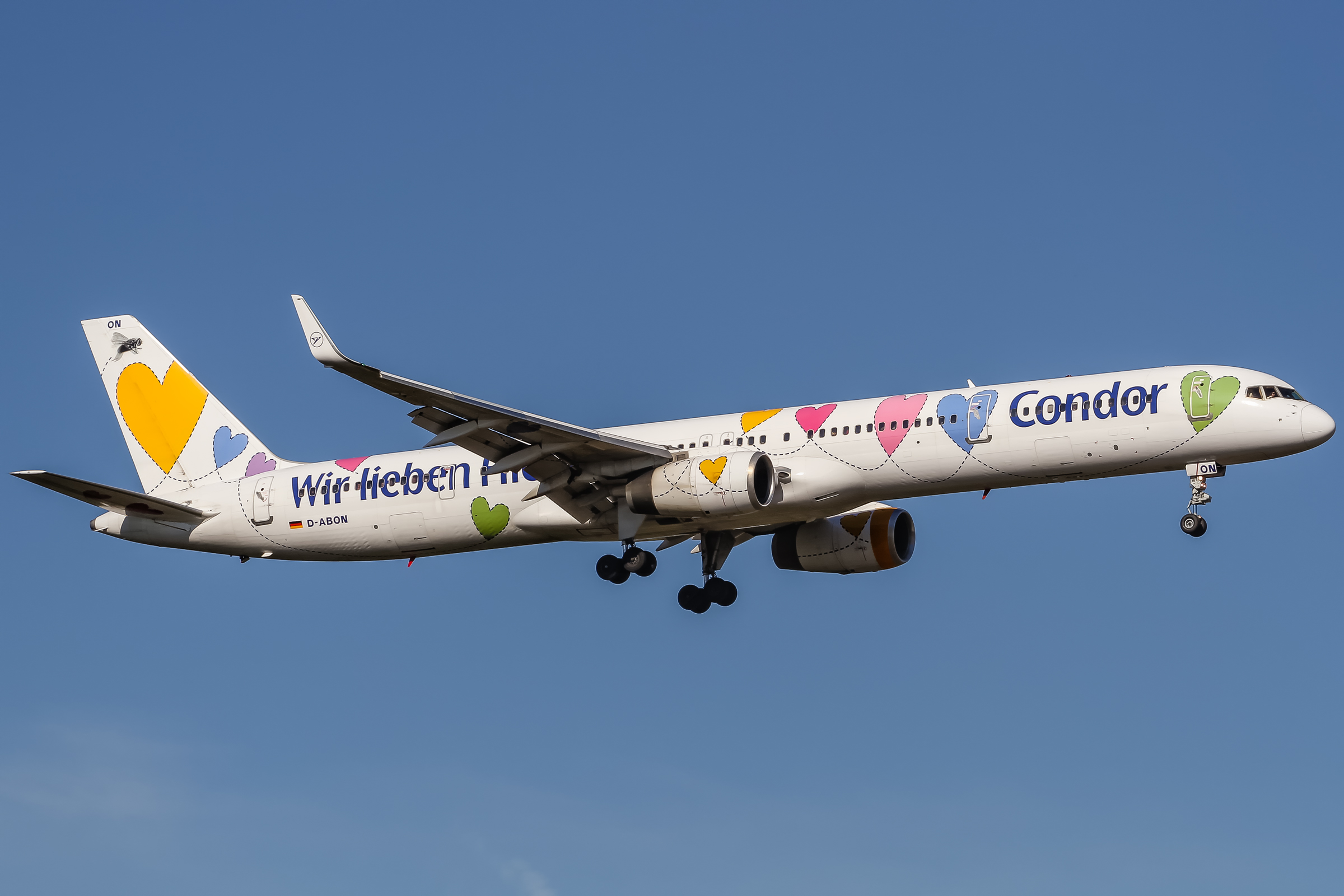
Former Boeing 757-300 in a special livery named Willi

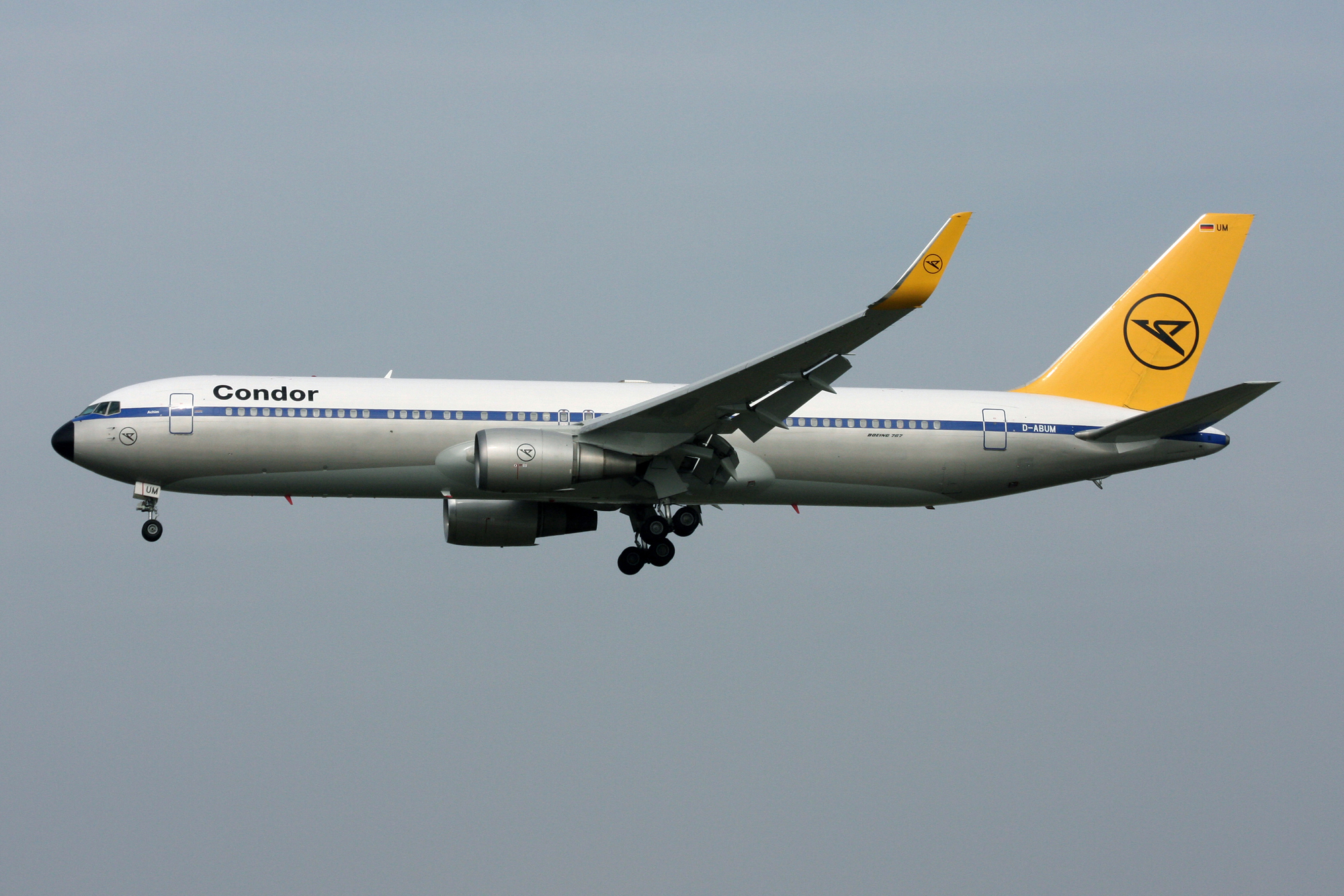
Former Boeing 767-300ER in a special livery named Achim

=== Loyalty and customer incentives ===
Condor does not operate a traditional mileage-based frequent flyer program. Instead, it offers purchasable "Condor Cards"—the "Activity Card" and "Family Card", each valid for 12 months. These cards provide "status like" benefits with e.g. priority boarding, free seat assignments or discounts on fares, vary by travel zone (Europe vs. World), and were launched with a 10% introductory discount.

Moreover, Condor maintains partnerships with Alaska Airlines Atmos Rewards and Emirates Skywards, enabling passengers to earn miles when flying with Condor by entering their frequent flyer number at check-in.

== Cabin ==
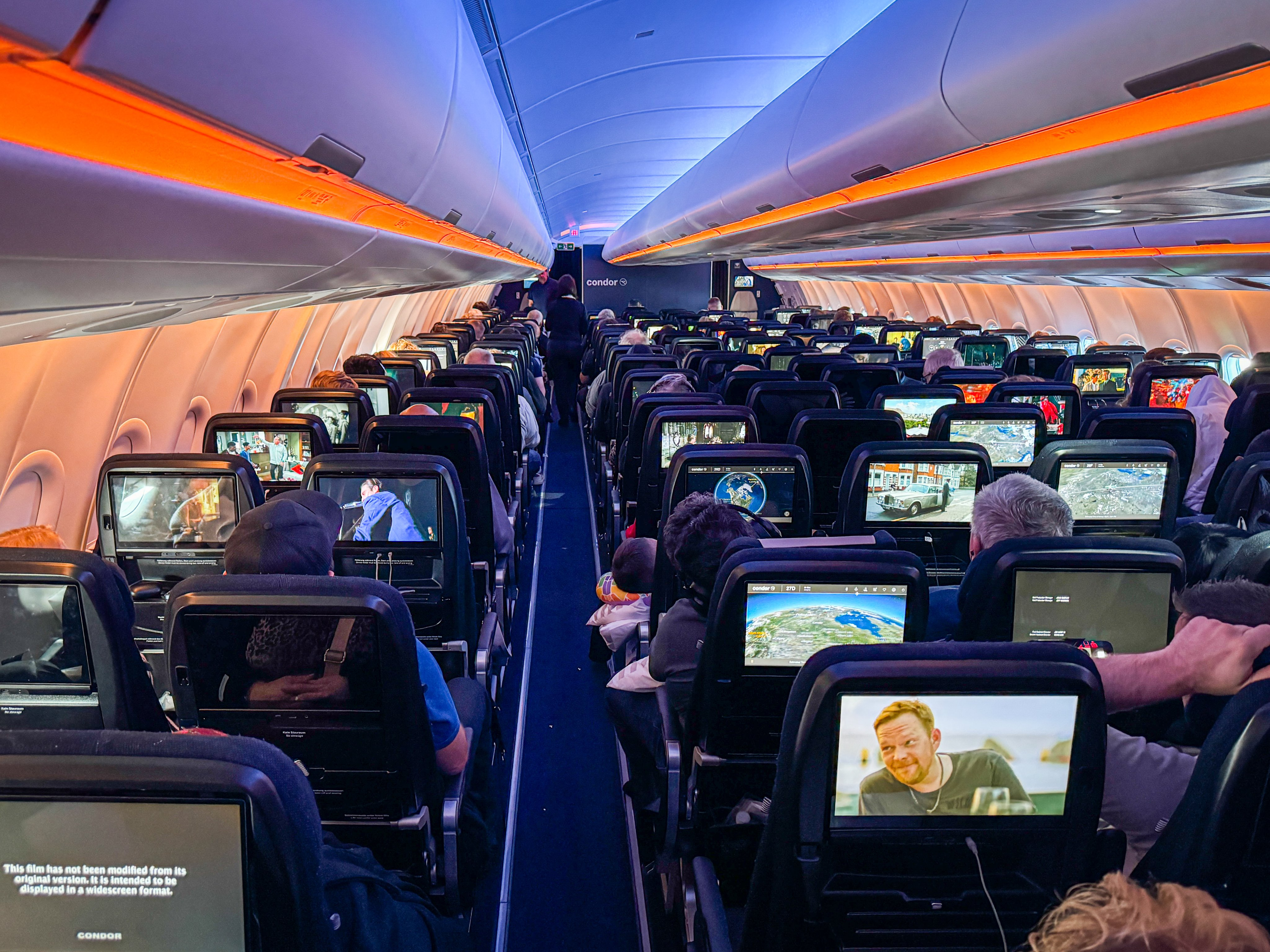
Condor economy class cabin aboard an Airbus A330-900

=== Airbus A330-900 ===
The Airbus A330-900 aircraft, which are delivered since December 2022, feature an entirely new cabin but retain Business, Premium Economy and Economy Class, with the difference between the two latter ones being 15 centimetres (5.9 in) more legroom and additional amenities and catering. All seats feature personal 4K resolution entertainment screens, but other than on the older 767 aircraft, all content is free of charge. The A330neo is also equipped with in-flight Wi-Fi. The Business Class now features a 1-2-1 seating configuration with 180-degree flat-beds and privacy dividers with the first row additionally providing more space and larger entertainment screens for an additional fee.

== Accidents and incidents ==
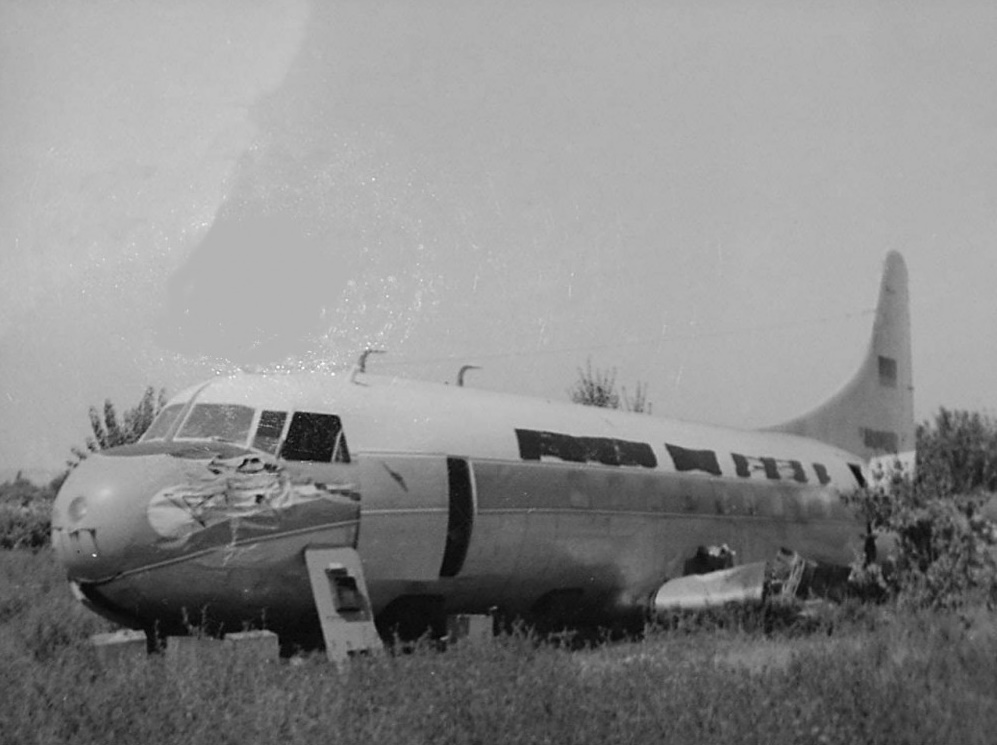
The damaged Convair CV-240 near Rimini Airport, August 1960

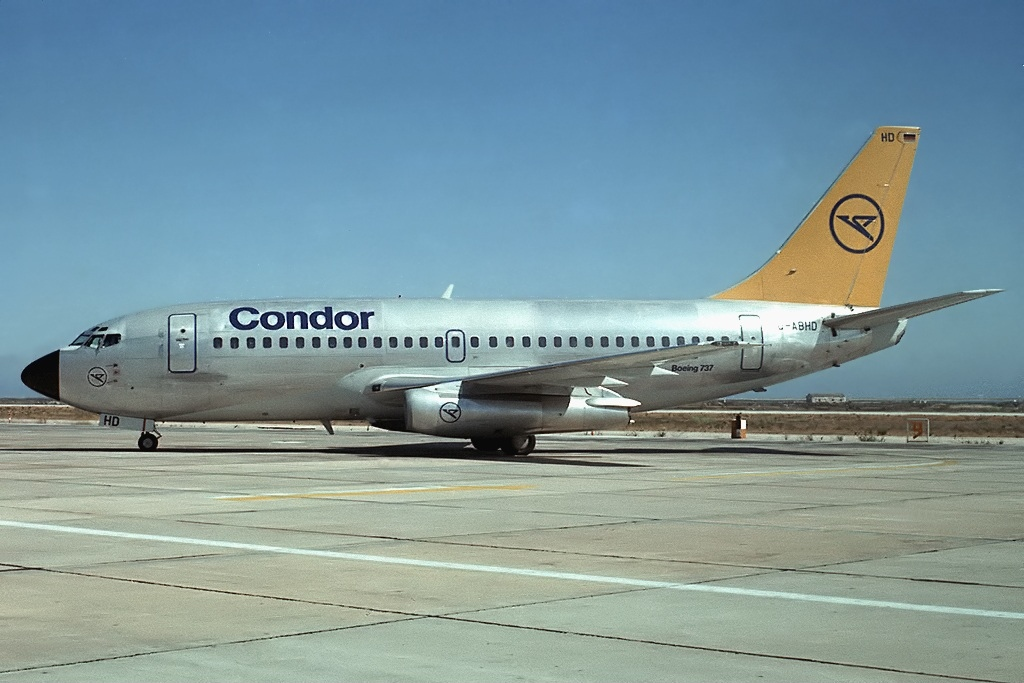
The Condor Boeing 737-230 D-ABHD that crashed in 1988 as Flight 3782

- On 17 October 1958, a Deutsche Flugdienst (as the airline was called at that time) Vickers VC.1 Viking (registered D-BELA) on a cargo flight had to carry out a forced landing near Zele in Belgium due to an engine fire. Upon impact, the aircraft caught fire and was destroyed, but all three crew members on board survived.
- On 31 July 1960, a Deutsche Flugdienst Convair CV-240 (registered D-BELU) en route from Frankfurt to Rimini experienced failures in both engines upon approaching Rimini Airport. The pilots had to carry out an emergency landing 1,000 metres (3,300 ft; 1,100 yd) short of the runway, which resulted in the death of one passenger (out of thirty, with additional four crew members on board) and the aircraft being written off.
- On 20 July 1970, a Condor Boeing 737-100 (registered D-ABEL) which was approaching Reus Airport, collided with a privately owned Piper Cherokee light aircraft (registration EC-BRU) near Tarragona, Spain. The Piper subsequently crashed, resulting in the death of the three persons on board. The Condor Boeing suffered only minor damage, and there were no injuries among the 95 passengers and 5 crew members.
- On 2 January 1988 at 19:18 local time, Condor Flugdienst Flight 3782, a Boeing 737-200 (registered D-ABHD) on a chartered service from Stuttgart to İzmir, crashed into a hill near Seferihisar whilst approaching Adnan Menderes Airport, killing all 11 passengers and 5 crew members on board. Wrong use of navigation aids and lack of adherence to company procedures especially in respect of crew coordination were given as causes for the accident.
- On 24 June 1992, a Condor Boeing 767-300 (registered D-ABUZ) took a wrong turn after departing Porlamar Airport in Venezuela on a charter flight back to Germany, resulting in an overflight of mountainous terrain at a low altitude. The aircraft hit a TV mast on top of El Copey (890 metres (2,920 ft), the second highest peak on Isla Margarita) with its left wing. The wing was substantially damaged (but could later be repaired), and the pilots managed to return to Porlamar Airport, without any of the 251 passengers and 12 crew members on board being injured.

== See also ==
- Lufthansa
- List of Condor Flugdienst destinations
- Thomas Cook Airlines
- Thomas Cook Group
- List of charter airlines
