= Polish Aviation Group =

Poland's largest aviation company

Polish Aviation Group (PGL)
- Trade name: Polska Grupa Lotnicza
- Type: State-owned
- Industry: Aviation
- Founded: January 1, 2018; 8 years ago in Warsaw, Poland
- Headquarters: Warsaw, Poland
- Area served: Europe, North America, Asia
- Key people: Radoslaw Stepien (CEO) Bartosz Piechota (Vice-President)
- Services: Airline Services; Passenger Air Transportation Services
- Operating income: est. at €47,000,000 (2018)
- Number of employees: 11-50 (2019)
- Subsidiaries: LOT Polish Airlines LOT Aircraft Maintenance Services; LS Airport Services LS Technics
- Website: https://pgl.pl/

Polish Aviation Group (Polska Grupa Lotnicza, PGL) is Poland's largest aviation company. It was founded in 2018 with an aim to merge Polish companies including LOT Polish Airlines, LOT Aircraft Maintenance Services, LS Airport Services and LS Technics. The group's headquarters are in Warsaw.

== History ==
The company was formed in January 2018 and consists of LOT Polish Airlines, LOT Aircraft Maintenance Services and LS Airport Services and LS Technics which were merged into the group in early October 2018. Its CEO is Rafał Milczarski. It was started with a capital of PLN 1.2 billion (EUR 290 million) as a joint stock company in January 2018. The new state-owned Polish Aviation Group (PGL), endowed with capital of PLN 2.5 billion, brings together the country’s largest aviation service providers.

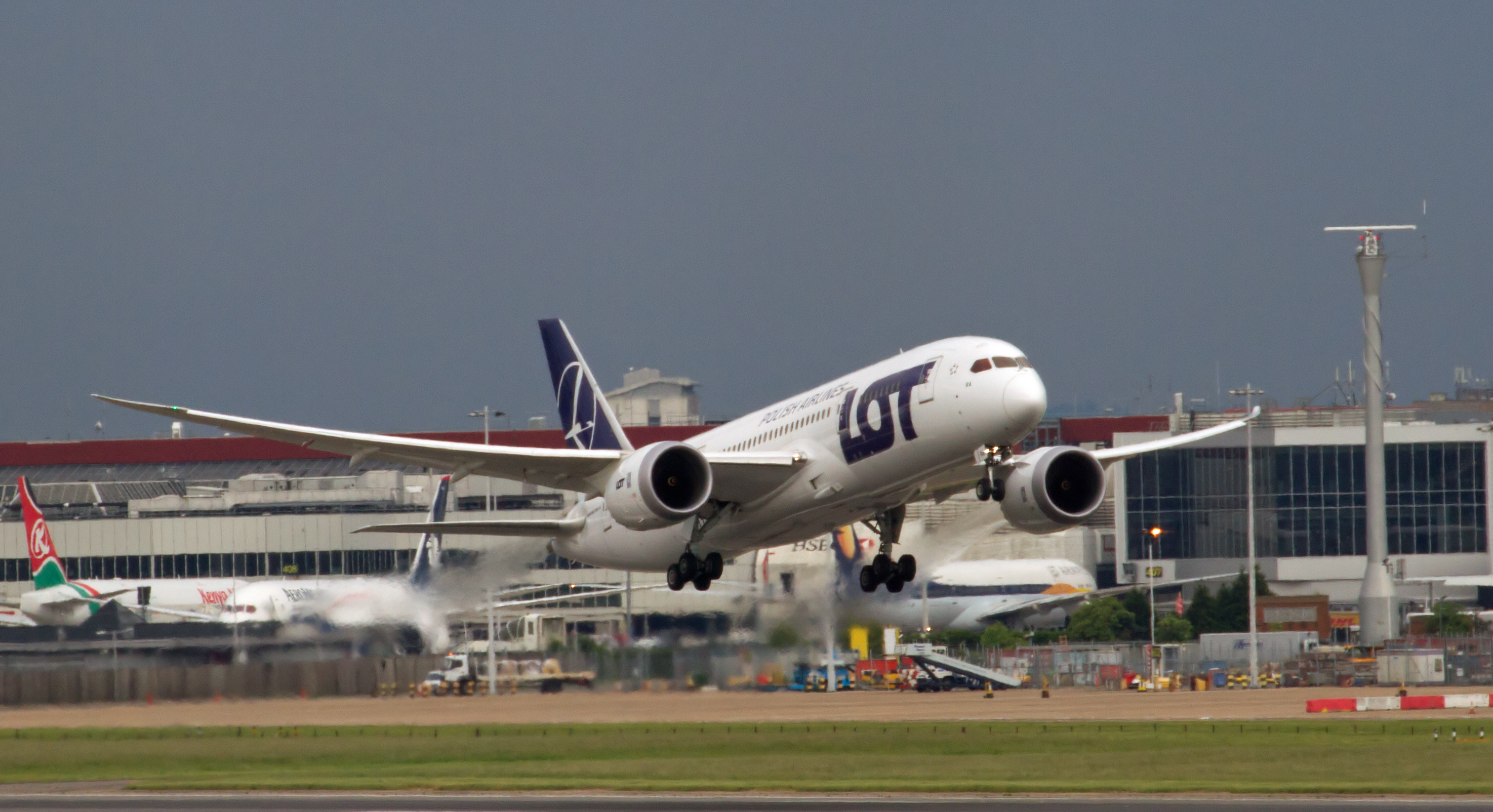
LOT Polish Airlines 787-8

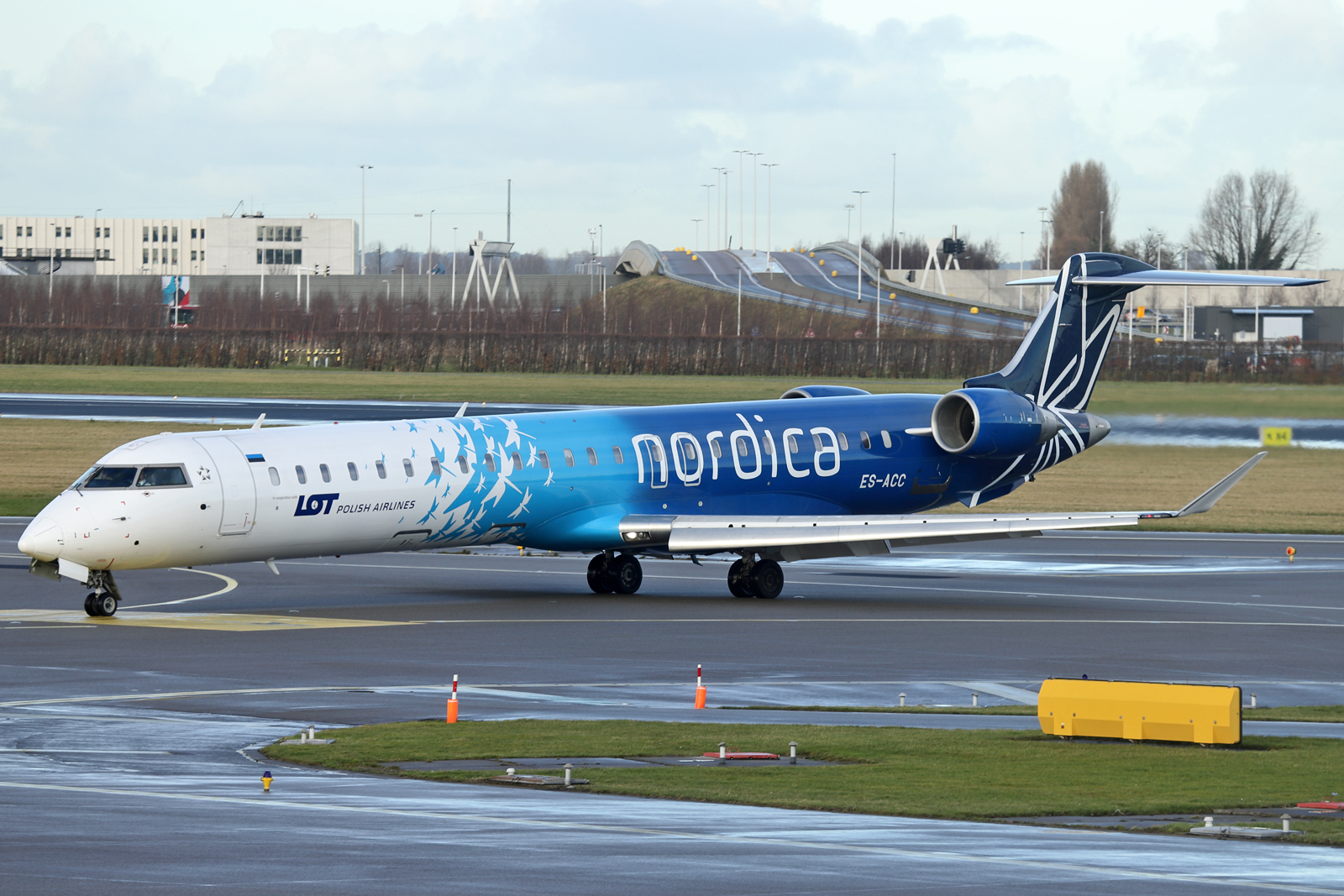
Nordica CRJ-900

On 24 January 2020 PGL announced that it would acquire Condor Flugdienst, and that the transaction was expected to be completed in April 2020 after consideration from anti-trust regulators. On 2 April 2020 it was announced that the sale had fallen through.

On 29 May 2020 Lot Polish Airlines S.A. was established, with PGL owning 100% of the shares. The reasons behind forming a company with a similar name remain unknown, with only speculations suggesting it might have been created to announce the controlled bankruptcy of PLL LOT, which faced financial challenges due to the COVID-19 pandemic.

In January 2022, the company rebranded as LOTAIR SA, and on March 16, 2023, it suspended operations for a period of 24 months.

== Corporate affairs ==
=== Divisions and subsidiaries ===
Its main subsidiaries are:

- (Poland) LOT Polish Airlines
- (Poland) LOT Aircraft Maintenance Services
- (Poland) LS Airport Services
- (Poland) LS Technics
- (Poland) PGL Leasing

=== Financial Results ===
Year Ended	Passengers Flown	Profit/Loss
31 December 2018	9,000,000	est. at €47,000,000
31 December 2019	10,000,000	unknown

== Operations ==
In 2019, LOT Polish Airlines served 10 million passengers which was their highest amount yet.
