= List of aviation accidents and incidents in 2009 =

This is a list of plane crashes in 2009, from January to December.

In 2009, the prototype Brändli Cherry, HB-YBX crashed after take-off from Sundsvall-Härnösand Airport in Sweden, killing both Dani Gerwer and its designer, Max Brändli.

== January ==
- On 2 January 2009, a British Gulf International Airlines An-12 skidded off the runway while taking off at Sharjah International Airport. The aircraft was on a cargo flight en route to Afghanistan. The aircraft incurred a little damage. This was followed by a temporary ban on the aircraft. The ban was rescinded in April 2009, but was reinstated permanently in February 2010.
- On January 3, 2009, American Airlines Flight 924, a Boeing 737-800, took off from José Maria Córdova Airport and had to make an emergency landing due to fire in one of its engines. Upon landing, the pilot was forced to use maximum braking, causing the brakes to overheat and one of the tires to explode. The airport was closed for four hours, but none of the 148 passengers on board were injured in the crash.
- On 4 January 2009, a Basler BT-67 C-GEAJ of Antarctic Logistics Centre International crashed on landing at Tony Camp, Antarctica (74°04′56″S 10°54′28″E) after a flight from Novolazarevskaya Station.
- On January 7, 2009, a Boeing 737-200 (registered YV1360), flying from Oranjestad to Valencia, made an emergency landing after an engine fire was reported. The aircraft diverted to Simón Bolívar International Airport where the aircraft landed safely. All 81 occupants on board were uninjured.
- January 8, 2009 - A Beechcraft Bonanza (BE36-A36) landed with its gear up causing runway 29/11 to be closed for about an hour. The pilot was the only person aboard and was not injured. The runway closure caused a SkyWest flight from San Francisco to divert to Southern California.
- On 14 January 2009, an Afghan Air Force Mi-17 crashed in Herat while en route to Farah province. All 13 on board were killed, including Maj. Gen. Fazl Ahmad Sayar, one of Afghanistan's four regional commanders.
- On January 15, 2009, US Airways Flight 1549, an Airbus A320 departing for Charlotte/Douglas International Airport ditched in the Hudson River after losing both engines as a result of multiple bird strikes at an altitude of 3,000 feet (910 m); all 150 passengers and 5 crew members successfully evacuated.
- On 15 January 2009, 4 people died when two Ilyushin Il-76 aircraft collided and caught fire.
- 17 January – A Eurocopter AS 532 of the French Navy crashes shortly after take-off from the amphibious assault ship Foudre off the coast of Gabon. Eight of the ten people on board are killed.
- On January 27, 2009, Empire Airlines Flight 8284, an ATR 42 under contract from FedEx Express, crashed on landing at Lubbock Preston Smith International Airport at 04:37 CT. The plane, which had been traveling from Fort Worth Alliance Airport, landed short of the touchdown zone and skidded off the runway amid light freezing rain. There was a small fire on the plane and two crew members were taken to hospital with minor injuries.
- On January 27, 2009, a Cessna Citation V operated by the Tyrol Air Ambulance with registration OE-GAA had a wheels-up landing at Tolmachevo.
- On 28 January 2009, a Ghana International Airlines Boeing 757 operating from Accra to London Gatwick, United Kingdom, with 96 passengers and nine crew reported anomalies with the control systems when climbing out of Accra. The crew declared a mayday and made a safe return to Accra International Airport where the remains of a beetle-like creature were discovered to be obstructing the left pitot system.
- On January 28, 2009, a single-engine SIAI-Marchetti SF.260 lost power following takeoff and attempted to return to the airport. The aircraft struck the ground on the north side of runway 21 and caught fire, killing pilot Paulo Emanuele, general manager of Airliners.net, and passenger Martin Schaedel, an Internet entrepreneur. Investigators determined a probable cause was the pilot's failure to select the proper fuel tank for takeoff, which resulted in a loss of engine power.

== February ==
- On 4 February 2009, a Douglas DC-3-65/AR^{A} N834TP of the National Test Pilot School was substantially damaged in a take-off accident at Mojave Air and Space Port, Mojave, California. Both sets of undercarriage and the port engine were ripped off. The aircraft was on a local training flight. The accident was caused by an incorrectly set rudder trim.
- On February 6, 2009, a Piper Warrior II was damaged during a hard landing at the Melbourne Orlando International Airport. The probable cause of the accident was found to be the student pilot's inadequate crosswind landing technique and the certified flight instructor's delayed remedial action, which resulted in a hard landing.
- On February 7, 2009, a general aviation Cessna 150 crash-landed in a field at Lethbridge, Canada. The pilot was landing when a gust of wind apparently overtook the aircraft. The pilot escaped uninjured, however the plane sustained major damage. The crash was investigated by Transport Canada and the Transportation Safety Board.
- On 7 February 2009: an EMB 110, operated by Manaus Aerotáxi, registration PT-SEA, flying a domestic route in Brazil from Coari to Manaus (Amazonas) struggled in bad weather conditions and crashed 80 km (50 mi) from Manaus killing 24 passengers. 4 survivors were reported.
- On February 12, 2009, Colgan Air Flight 3407, a Bombardier Dash 8 Q400 operating under contract with Continental Connection, crashed into a home on Long Street in Clarence Center. The flight from Newark Liberty International Airport was only approximately 6 mi (9.7 km) away from the airport when it crashed. All 49 passengers and crew members on board the aircraft died in the incident, along with one person on the ground. Two others who were in the home at the time of the accident escaped alive. Minutes before the accident, the crew had reported "significant ice buildup" on the wings and the windshield, and an NTSB official said that the aircraft had experienced "severe pitch-and-roll excursions" 40 seconds prior to the crash. This was the first fatal accident of an airliner on US soil in almost three years after the crash of Comair Flight 5191. The crash was attributed to an aerodynamic stall caused by the crew's failure to monitor their airspeed.
- On 13 February 2009, Austrian Airlines Flight OS780, Bombardier Dash 8 Q400 scheduled flight from Skopje to Vienna, failed to retract landing gear after take-off and performed an emergency landing on Skopje Airport.
- On February 13, 2009, Cebu Pacific Flight 651 arriving from Manila, performed by an Airbus A319, suffered a bird strike upon landing at Tacloban, damaging the engine blades. Though the aircraft landed safely, its return flight was cancelled.
- On 13 February 2009, BA Cityflyer Flight 8456 (an Avro RJ100, registered G-BXAR, flying from Amsterdam) suffered a nose-gear collapse whilst landing at London City Airport. None of the 67 passengers or five crew members were seriously injured in the incident, but three passengers suffered minor injuries, two of whom were kept in hospital overnight. After a normal approach the nose landing-gear fractured as it was lowered onto the runway, due to the presence of a fatigue-crack in the upper internal bore of the landing-gear main fitting. It was found that the crack had formed as a result of poor surface finish during manufacture, and the incomplete embodiment of a manufacturer's service bulletin, which the landing-gear maintenance records showed as being implemented at its last overhaul in June 2006. The aircraft was damaged beyond economic repair, and was written off by insurers in May 2009.
- On February 15, 2009, a Cessna 208B Grand Caravan (registered YV1950) overran the runway at Guasdualito Airport following a domestic flight from Las Flecheras Airport. The airplane sustained damage to the propeller and the underside of the fuselage.
- On 18 February 2009, a Basler BT-67 (registration PNC-0211) of the Colombian National Police was destroyed by the accidental detonation of a number of hand grenades. Eight people were injured, four of them seriously. The aircraft was due to fly 25 police officers to El Caraño Airport, Quibdó.
- On 20 February 2009, an Aerolift Antonov An-12 crashed upon take-off at Luxor International Airport, Egypt due to an engine fire, killing all five crew members on board.
- On February 22, 2009, a Golden Rule Airways An-2 carrying cargo and crew was damaged beyond repair after it crashed in a field due to loss of engine power. There were no fatalities.
- On February 23, 2009, an Algerian Air Force C-130 crashed, details not known.

== March ==
- On 4 March 2009, a man who did not hold a pilot's certificate took off in a Beechcraft Bonanza A36, N5470V, and crashed in a wooded area about 2 mi (3.2 km) from Athens Municipal Airport, suffering minor injuries and severely damaging the aircraft. A ground witness saw the man enter the aircraft; believing the entry was not authorized, he telephoned the aircraft owner, who notified police. The accident pilot was in turn arrested by police when he returned to the airport to retrieve his car. The NTSB attributed the accident to the non-certificated pilot's failure to maintain aircraft control.
- On March 9, 2009, Bangladesh Army aviation unit Bell 206L flown by pilot Lt Col MD Shahidul Islam and co-pilot Major Saif crashed at Rouha in Kalihati sub-district. The helicopter was carrying General Officer Commanding of 55th Infantry Division and Jessore Area Commander Maj Gen Rafiqul Islam. Maj Gen Islam and pilot Lt Col Islam died in the crash while co-pilot Major Saif sustained serious injuries.
- On March 9, 2009 Aerolift Ilyushin Il-76 S9-SAB crashed into Lake Victoria just after takeoff from Entebbe Airport, Uganda, killing all 11 people on board. Two of the engines had caught fire on take-off. The aircraft had been chartered by DynCorp on behalf of AMISOM. The accident was investigated by Uganda's Ministry of Transport, which concluded that all four engines were time-expired and that Aerolift's claim that maintenance had been performed which extended their service live and that the work had been certified could not be substantiated.
- On 12 March, a Sikorsky S-92 suffers a mechanical failure and ditches in the Atlantic Ocean off the coast of Newfoundland, Canada. Seventeen of the 18 people on board are killed.
- On March 17, 2009, at 3:00pm a Piper Comanche (PA-24) missed the runway on landing, apparently catching a wind gust. The wind caused the aircraft to veer off the runway, down a grass side embankment and through a fence. The incident caused the runway to be closed for 10 to 15 minutes but no aircraft were delayed. The one occupant of the aircraft, the pilot, was not injured.
- On March 20, 2009, a Piper PA-28 Cherokee crashed after touchdown at the Delaware Airpark. The pilot had executed a go-around on his first attempt. On the second attempt, upon nearing touchdown, the aircraft began a turn to the left. It touched down 75 feet off the edge of the runway and continued to diverge from the runway. It struck two parked airplanes, at which point its right wing separated from the fuselage, and the aircraft came to rest. The probable cause of the accident was found to be the pilot's failure to maintain directional control during landing.
- On 20 March 2009, Emirates Flight 407, an Airbus A340-500 registered as A6-ERG, failed to take off properly from Melbourne Airport, hitting several structures at the end of the runway before eventually climbing enough to return to the airport for a safe landing. There were no injuries, but the occurrence was severe enough to be classified an accident by the Australian Transport Safety Bureau. The plane was subsequently repaired, and returned to service for five years before it was scrapped.
- On March 22, 2009, a Pilatus PC-12 flying in from Oroville, California, crashed in Holy Cross Cemetery 500 feet from Bart Mooney Airport, killing all 14 passengers and crew on board.
- On 23 March, FedEx Express Flight 80, an MD-11 aircraft from Guangzhou Baiyun International Airport, China, crashed on Runway 16R/34L during landing, killing both the pilot and co-pilot. Runway 16R/34L, which is required for long-distance flights and heavier aircraft, was closed for a full day due to necessary investigations, repairs and removal of wreckage. This was the first fatal airplane crash to occur at the airport since its opening in 1978.
- On 25 March, a Bell 206L-4 LongRanger crashes into Mount Keş, Turkey, killing all six people on board.
- On March 25, 2009, a Cessna 182, registration number N4871N, crashed 3 mi (4.8 km) west of Blue Grass Airport, killing the pilot, who was flying alone. The pilot apparently became disoriented during the landing approach after losing electrical power in densely clouded IFR conditions, but the cause of the crash was not positively determined.

== April ==
- In April 2009, a Cirrus SR22 crashed after takeoff from the Cuyahoga County Airport.
- On 1 April 2009, a Eurocopter AS332L2 Super Puma Mk 2 of Bond Offshore Helicopters suffers a mechanical failure and crashes into the North Sea off the coast of Aberdeenshire. All 16 people on board are killed.
- On April 2, a Chemtrad Aviation Britten-Norman Islander crashed in Baggao, Philippines. All 13 people on board died.
- On April 6, 2009, a Cessna 172N, C-GFJH, belonging to Confederation College in Thunder Bay, Ontario, Canada, was stolen by a student who flew it into United States airspace over Lake Superior. The 172 was intercepted and followed by NORAD F-16s, finally landing on Highway 60 in Ellsinore, Missouri, after a seven-hour flight. The student pilot, a Canadian citizen born in Turkey, Adam Dylan Leon, formerly known as Yavuz Berke, suffered from depression and was attempting to commit suicide by being shot down, but was instead arrested shortly after landing. On November 3, 2009, he was sentenced to two years in a US federal prison after pleading guilty to all three charges against him: interstate transportation of a stolen aircraft, importation of a stolen aircraft, and illegal entry into the US. College procedures at the time allowed easy access to aircraft and keys were routinely left in them.
- On 6 April 2009, an Indonesian Air Force F27 crashed in Bandung, Indonesia, killing all 24 occupants on board. The cause of the accident was said to be heavy rain. The aircraft reportedly crashed into a hangar during its landing procedure and killed all on board.
- On 9 April 2009, an Aviastar BAe 146-300 PK-BRD, crashed to a mountain near Wamena, Papua, Indonesia, after a failed second approach for landing at Wamena Airport.
- On April 12, 2009, a Beechcraft King Air 200 (N559DW) was carrying four passengers when the pilot went unconscious and later died. Doug White, a passenger, was guided into Southwest Florida by air traffic controller Brian Norton, assisted by controller Dan Favio. It was later reported that White was a single engine private pilot with about 130 hours of experience in single engine aircraft. All passengers aboard survived and the plane was not damaged.
- On April 15, 2009, an Adlair Aviation flight was returning from Yellowknife to Cambridge Bay. The plane in the incident was a Beechcraft King Air 200 with tail number C-GCYN. While about 180 km (110 mi) from the airport, and at 23,000 ft (7,000 m), one of the two passengers, Julian Tologanak-Labrie, (Note: Some sources give the victim's first name as Julien, and the victim's last name as Tologanak.) became upset, opened the cabin door and jumped to his death. The aircraft landed in Cambridge Bay with the damaged door partially open and no injuries to the flight crew or the other passenger.
- On 16 April 2009, Merpati Nusantara Airlines Flight 616, a Boeing 737-300 operating from Bandung to Surabaya and Denpasar, aborted its takeoff after rolling approximately 400 meters (1,310 ft) along the runway and subsequently returned to the apron. No injuries or fatalities were reported.
- On 17 April 2009, Mimika Air Flight 514, operated by Pilatus PC-6 PK-LTJ crashed into Mount Gergaji, Papua, killing all ten people on board.
- On April 17, 2009, a Cessna 421 crashed shortly after take-off from the airport around 11:20 a.m. Local authorities stated the aircraft crashed into a vacant home located about two miles (3.2 km) from the airport. The aircraft was en route to Fernandina Beach, Florida near Jacksonville and was due to arrive at 13:00. The Federal Aviation Administration indicated that one person was on board the aircraft, and was killed in the accident. Sebring Air Charter of Tamarac, Florida was listed on FAA records as the owner of the aircraft. The probable cause of the accident was determined to be pilot error, with an inflight fire of the right engine as a contributing factor.
- On April 17, 2009, a Cessna 208B Grand Caravan (registered YV1181) crashed shortly after taking off from Canaima National Park after failing to gain sufficient altitude, killing one person. The aircraft had been chartered to take holiday makers to Ciudad Bolívar.
- On 26 April 2009, a Douglas DC-3C N136FS of Four Star Air Cargo was destroyed when a fire broke out in the cockpit at Luis Muñoz Marín International Airport, Carolina, Puerto Rico. The aircraft was taxiing for take-off on a mail flight to Cyril E. King Airport, Charlotte Amalie, United States Virgin Islands.
- On April 27, 2009, a Boeing 737-200 (registered YV268T) suffered hydraulic problems causing the crew to burn off fuel in a holding pattern and landed back at La Chinita International Airport. None of the 84 occupants were injured while the aircraft was repaired and returned to service.

== May ==
- On 3 May 2009, a Mil Mi-17 of the Venezuelan Army crashes in Táchira province. All seventeen people on board are killed.
- On May 6, 2009, a World Airways DC-10-30 with registration N139WA operating as Flight 8535 from Leipzig, Germany for the Military Airlift Command experienced a hard landing at BWI. As a result of the captain's response to the hard landing, the plane's nose wheel struck the runway hard two times. The aircraft blew one of its front tires and had to execute a go-around before landing successfully. Several passengers were injured, including the first officer, who suffered back trauma. The age of the aircraft (29 years 11 months at the time of the accident) and the extent of damage to the front landing gear and fuselage resulted in the aircraft being written off. The aircraft was parted out and is now used on-site for fire/rescue training and practice purposes.
- On May 19, 2009, Thomas Jukovich, an American Airlines ramp worker, died after falling to the ground while loading luggage onto Flight 995 at Miami International Airport. The aircraft, a Boeing 777, was scheduled to depart to São Paulo, Brazil. The flight was later cancelled.
- On May 25, 2009, an Aero Commander 500S Shrike Commander crashed just after departure from the Daytona Beach International Airport. The probable cause of the accident was found to be a total loss of engine power due to fuel exhaustion as a result of the pilot’s inadequate preflight inspection.
- On May 31, 2009, a Cessna 182 Skylane was damaged after a hard landing at the Destin Executive Airport. The probable cause of the incident was found to be the pilot's improper recovery from a bounced landing.
- In May 2009, Steven Raddatz was killed when his Van's Aircraft RV-8 collided with a Russian-made Yakovlek owned and flown by B.J. Kennamore, the latter of which landed safely after the collision.

== June ==
- In June 2009, a Cessna Citation business jet on an instrument approach procedure to the Ross County Airport in Chillicothe mistakenly landed at the Pickaway County Memorial Airport, believing it to be his destination.
- On 6 June 2009, Myanma Airways Flight 409, a Fokker F28 registration XY-ADW, overran the runway at Sittwe Airport. The aircraft was damaged beyond repair.
- On June 7, a Strait Air Britten-Norman BN-2 Islander crashed on approach to Port Hope Simpson Airport. The pilot is killed.
- On June 7, 2009, a Learjet 60 (registration N500SW) veered off the runway on landing and came to rest on the right side of the runway with a collapsed right main gear, with no injuries to the eight persons on board.
- 8 June 2009: The West Midlands Police helicopter (G-WMAO) was destroyed by arsonists, and subsequently written off. A year later, a new Eurocopter EC135 similar to G-WMAO was handed over to West Midlands Police at the Farnborough Airshow. Thousands of pounds were subsequently spent upgrading security surrounding the police helicopter.
- On June 10, 2009, Jetstar Flight 20 flying from Kansai International Airport to Gold Coast Airport experienced a small fire in the cockpit apparently caused by a fault in the heating system. The fire was quickly extinguished by the pilots who subsequently diverted the plane to Guam. All 203 people on board were unharmed in the incident. The Australian Transport Safety Bureau determined the cause of the fire to be an overheat related to the use of a polysulfide sealant in the electrical connections to the windshield.
- On June 14, 2009, an Express Air Dornier 328 swerved off the runway at Tanahmerah Airport and skidded into an earthen mound. This resulted in substantial damage to the right engine and propeller.
- On June 15, 2009, a Cessna A188B crashed while landing on the grass runway at South Haven Regional. The pilot said he lowered the aircraft's nose upon reaching the paved taxiway, but the airplane bounced when contacting the taxiway and veered right. The pilot attempted to correct, but the airplane ground-looped on the paved intersecting runway/taxiway.
- On 27 June 2009, a British Airways Boeing 777-200ER G-RAES was damaged, while it was parked, by a collision with a Hainan Airlines Airbus A340-600 B-6510.
- On June 27, 2009, Allegiant Air Flight 746, a McDonnell Douglas MD-80 aircraft, made an emergency landing at Lehigh Valley after flames were observed coming from the aircraft's left engine. The flight was bound for Orlando Sanford International Airport. During takeoff, one of the aircraft's tires shredded and part of it was sucked into the engine, causing engine failure and a momentary fire. The plane landed safely minutes later with no injuries reported.

== July ==
- On July 3, 2009, a Cessna 150 crashed while attempting a forced landing at Central Illinois. The engine suddenly quit while the aircraft was on approach to make a forced landing. The pilot reported the plane stalled while approaching a road, and while he attempted to lower the nose and dump flaps, the left wing impacted a tree and the aircraft impacted the ground.
- On 3 July, a Pakistan Army Mil Mi-17 helicopter crashes in Khyber Pass, Pakistan, killing all 41 people on board.
- On July 4, 2009, a Lancair monoplane flew from Lancaster, Pennsylvania to Ocean City Airport, and struck two Canada geese while landing. The plane veered off the runway and struck a light. The accident damaged the plane's propeller, the right-main landing gear, and the frame. The NTSB credited the incident to the lack of a wildlife management program at the airport; as a result, the airport began warning pilots of wildlife. Subsequently, workers captured and removed over 40 geese from the airport.
- On July 5, 2009, a Cessna single-engine airplane made an emergency landing after circling the airport for 45 minutes due to faulty landing gear. The plane was damaged; the pilot and two passengers were not injured.
- On 5 July 2009, a Trislander belonging to Great Barrier Airlines (now Barrier Air) lost its starboard side prop six minutes into a flight from Great Barrier Island, New Zealand, to Auckland. The propeller sheared off and impacted the fuselage, prompting a successful emergency landing. While there were injuries, no deaths were reported. The accident was caused by undetected corrosion of the propeller flange, which led to its eventual failure.
- On July 9, 2009, at approximately 10:08 pm, a Piper Navajo airplane originating from Victoria crashed into an industrial area in Richmond, British Columbia. The two pilots were killed. It was owned and operated by Canadian Air Charters and was carrying units of blood for Canadian Blood Services at the time. Officials say that wake turbulence was the main cause of the crash. Fatigue, along with diminished depth perception in darkness, was also a factor.
- On 14 July 2009, a Piper Cherokee crashed near Lunken Airport while trying to land, seriously injuring the pilot.
- On July 15, 2009, a Beechcraft S35 Bonanza overrran the runway while landing at Tuscola Airport. The pilot’s first attempt to land resulted in a go-around because the airplane was too high and fast. During the second landing attempt, the airplane bounced and the pilot did another go-around. The plane was still too fast on the third attempt and touched down 1/3 or 1/2 way down the runway. The pilot applied the brakes, but the airplane went off the end of the runway. The pilot made a sharp left turn to avoid hitting a ditch head-on. The right main landing gear and nose gear collapsed, and the right wing came to rest on the road. The probable cause of the accident was found to be the pilot's failure to maintain proper speed and distance during approach, which resulted in landing long and subsequent runway excursion.
- On 15 July 2009, Caspian Airlines Flight 7908, a Tupolev Tu-154 bound for Yerevan, Armenia, crashed in Qazvin province 16 minutes after take-off from Imam Khomeini International Airport. All 168 passengers and crew were killed.
- On July 19, 2009, at around 6:15 pm, a Rutan VariEze crashed shortly after takeoff due to fuel starvation, impacting a hangar approximately 50 yards (46 m) from Runway 31. The pilot was the sole occupant and was killed.
- On July 19, 2009, a Cessna 172 Skyhawk experienced a loss of throttle control during a practice instrument approach at DuPage. The flight landed without incident. The probable cause was found to be a partial loss of engine power due to the detachment of the throttle control from the throttle assembly; contributing to the incident was a lack of redundant means to preclude the detachment of the cable from the throttle assembly.
- On July 23, 2009, a Robinson R-44 helicopter crashed shortly after taking off from Hagerstown Regional Airport. The helicopter crashed onto Interstate 70 near South Mountain at 10:30 p.m. Four people on board were killed and nobody on the ground was hurt.
- On 24 July 2009, Aria Air Flight 1525, an Ilyushin Il-62, route THR-MHD (Tehran Mehrabad, to Mashhad) crashed with 173 people on board and caught fire; five passengers and 11 crew members died.
- On July 24, 2009, a Beech H-18 veered to the left and off runway 02 at the Dayton–Wright Brothers Airport after the tail wheel touched down during landing. The pilot stated the tail wheel lock pin did not remain in the locked position. The right main landing gear collapsed and the right wing skin became wrinkled when it contacted the ground resulting in substantial damage.

== August ==
- On August 2, 2009, an Embraer EMB 120 Brasilia (registered 5N-BLN) suffered a fire on the right engine after the pilots started the engines. All 28 passengers and 5 crew members were uninjured.
- On August 2, 2009, a Rutan Long-EZ experienced engine failure after takeoff. The pilot attempted to turn back to the runway, but crashed on the taxiway in the process of landing. The pilot, flying alone, was severely injured and the airplane was destroyed.
- On August 4, 2009, a Eurocopter AS 350B3 helicopter was substantially damaged while maneuvering at Herlong Recreational Airport. The pilots were practicing maneuvers with the hydraulic system turned off to simulate a hydraulic system failure. The probable cause of the accident was found to be the flight instructor's improper decision to attempt hover flight without hydraulic power and his subsequent loss of control.
- On 4 August 2009, Bangkok Airways Flight 266, an ATR 72 arriving from Krabi skidded off the runway, killing one of the pilots.
- On 4 August 2009, a SATA Internacional Airbus A320-200 operating flight S4-129 from Lisbon to Ponta Delgada bounced off the runway then subsequently experienced a severe hard landing of 4.86g, causing damage to the landing gear. Nothing was written in the aircraft's technical maintenance log, both flight crew and maintenance staff were unable to interpret the hard landing report and despite the damage, the aircraft was not removed from service and flew back to Lisbon in customer service as well as flying an additional 6 sectors. SATA said in a statement that the hard landing/load reports are not a mandatory requirement for the aircraft type and drew attention to the amount of time Airbus took to confirm to them the interpretation of the load report. Both landing gear legs subsequently had to be replaced. In their final report the Portuguese accident investigation authority the Aviation Accidents Prevention and Investigation Department determined that the primary cause of the incident was the ground spoilers deploying in flight after the aircraft had bounced 12 ft off the runway. Contributing factors were the failure of the pilot to go-around after the bounce, the failure of the pilot to release the thrust levers before the first touchdown (which inhibited the ground spoilers deploying) and the pilot providing insufficient flare input.
- On 8 August, a Eurocopter AS350 collides with a Piper PA-32R over the Hudson River between Hoboken, New Jersey and New York City, United States. The six occupants of the helicopter and the three occupants of the Piper aircraft all perish.
- On 13 August 2009, a privately owned Yakovlev Yak-18T (registration ZU-BHR) performed an emergency landing on the then unfinished runway at King Shaka International Airport due to a fuel contamination issue, becoming the first aircraft to land at KSIA.
- On August 16, 2009, while preparing for the MAKS-2009, two Sukhoi Su-27s of the Russian Knights aerobatic team crashed into each other, killing the commander of the team and injuring several people on the ground. The death of the pilot was paid tribute to by a minute of silence at the opening of the airshow.
- On August 16, a Britten-Norman Islander ditched into the sea short of Simon Bolivar International Airport, Venezuela. All nine people survive.
- On 16 August 2009, a just-completed prototype AVCEN Jetpod crashed, killing the founder of Avcen, Michael Robert Dacre, who was the sole occupant. Dacre had attempted to take off three times and on the fourth successfully lifted off and climbed to 200 meters. then the aircraft became uncontrollable and crashed. According to Taiping deputy police chief Syed A. Wahab Syed A. Majid, the company had not obtained permission from the Royal Malaysian Air Force to conduct the flight tests.
- On August 21, 2009, around 3:00 a.m., a Beechcraft Baron crashed while attempting to land. The pilot and passenger survived but sustained burns requiring the attention of Saint Barnabas Medical Center's burn unit, the only one in the state of New Jersey. The plane was believed to have originated at Reading, PA, and was carrying blood samples for Quest Diagnostics, which had a lab on property adjacent to Teterboro Airport.
- On 23 August 2009, a private Piper Saratoga (registration: G-BTCA) crashed due to turbulence caused by nearby cliffs on approach to Alderney Airport. The pilot and 3 passengers sustained minor injuries.
- On 26 August 2009, an Antonov An-12 of Aero-Fret (registered TN-AIA) crashed on approach. The flight had originated from Pointe Noire Airport. The five Ukrainian crew and one Congolese passenger were killed.
- On August 26, 2009, a Cessna 208B Grand Caravan had to make an emergency landing on the way from Los Roques Airport to Santiago Mariño Caribbean International Airport after an engine failure. The passengers and crew were rescued by fishing and pleasure boats.

== September ==
- On 2 September, Andhra Pradesh Chief Minister Y. S. Rajasekhara Reddy's Bell 430 helicopter crashes, killing all five people on board.
- On 4 September 2009, Air India Flight 829 a Boeing 747–437 (registered VT-ESM), flying from Mumbai to Riyadh caught fire at the Airport. The fire started in the number one engine due to fuel leak while the aircraft was taxiing to Runway 27 for take-off. An emergency evacuation was carried out with no injuries among the 229 people (213 passengers and 16 crew) on board. As the fire damage was substantial and spread to the engine pylon, which required time consuming repairs, the Boeing 747-400 was declared a total loss and thus written off. The plane was scrapped in May 2011 for parts.
- On 7 September 2009, a Nomad of the Indonesian Naval Aviation Unit, PENERBAL, crashed in the area of Bulungan, East Borneo. The aircraft was on a routine patrol near Ambalat Oil Block. The accident caused the fatality of one Naval officer, plus three civilians on board. The pilot and copilot received serious injuries.
- On September 9, 2009, hijacked Aeroméxico Flight 576 landed at Mexico City International Airport from Cancún International Airport.
- On 22 September 2009, Islamic Republic of Iran Air Force Il-76MD Adnan 2 "5-8208" Simorgh crashed near Varamin killing all seven people on board. The crash was possibly the result of a mid-air collision with a Northrop F-5E Tiger II.
- On 24 September 2009, South African Airlink Flight 8911 crashed in the suburb of Merebank shortly after takeoff from Durban International Airport, injuring its crew of three and one person on the ground, with the pilot subsequently dying of his injuries in hospital.
- On 26 September 2009, British Airways Flight 2156 to V. C. Bird International Airport, Antigua, operated by Boeing 777-236 G-VIIR entered the runway through the wrong taxiway, prior to takeoff. This resulted in the aircraft having 695m less available for takeoff, compared to the correct taxiway entry. The takeoff was however completed normally without incident or injuries. The AAIB report concluded the following factors contributed to the incident: "The airport authority had not installed any taxiway or holding point signs on the airfield. The crew did not brief the taxi routing. The crew misidentified Taxiway Bravo for Taxiway Alpha and departed from Intersection Bravo. The trainee ATCO did not inform the flight crew that they were at Intersection Bravo."

== October ==
- On 2 October 2009, Malaysia Airlines Boeing 737-4H6 9M-MMR was substantially damaged when the port main undercarriage collapsed while the aircraft was parked at the gate.
- On October 14, 2009, a single-engined private plane exploded in mid-air while flying over Bonaire. Witnesses near the west coast of the island witnessed a ball of fire falling from the sky at around 9 pm. The bodies of the pilot and a passenger were recovered along with bales of drugs. The bodies, aircraft type and drug type have yet to be identified.
- On 17 October 2009, a Douglas C-47D RP-C550 of Victoria Air crashed after take-off from Ninoy Aquino International Airport, Manila and was destroyed; all four crew on board died. The aircraft was operating a cargo flight to Puerto Princesa International Airport, Puerto Princesa City. Amongst the cargo were six drums of aviation fuel. An intense fire broke out which destroyed the aircraft. Twenty-two houses were destroyed by fire.
- On October 18, 2009, a Pietenpol Air Camper crashed while operating at the Toledo Executive Airport. The pilot was conducting takeoffs and landings in the airport's traffic pattern at the time of the accident. He added that he had been dealing with "moderate turbulence from thermals and the shifting winds" during the flight. During the accident landing, the pilot stated that the airplane drifted left of the runway centerline during the landing roundout. As the left main wheel touched down, a gust of wind from the right caused the airplane to depart the left side of the runway. The pilot avoided a ground loop but still clipped a runway light with the horizontal stabilizer. The probable cause of the accident was found to be the pilot's failure to maintain directional control during landing.
- On October 20, 2009, Centurion Air Cargo Flight 431, a McDonnell Douglas MD-11F (registered N701GC) sustained damage on landing at Carrasco International Airport. The right hand main landing gear leg was bent sideways during landing on runway 24. The crew managed to stop on taxiway A where the airplane had to be offloaded.
- On 21 October 2009, Azza Transport Flight 2241, operated by a Boeing 707–320, crashed on take-off. The flight was carrying cargo only and all six crew members were killed.
- On October 21, 2009, a Britten-Norman Islander BN-2A flight operated by local commuter airline, Divi Divi Air Flight 014 lost an engine while in flight to Bonaire and had to ditch in the sea south-west of Klein Bonaire and five minutes out from Bonaire. Pilot Robert Mansell, 32, managed to successfully ditch the plane in the water but was knocked unconscious on impact. The passengers tried to undo his safety harness, but the plane was sinking too fast and he went down with the aircraft, but rescue boats managed to pick up all of the nine passengers that were on board. The aircraft involved was registered as PJ-SUN
- On October 21, 2009, a Utah Valley University student was killed when the engine on his single-engine aircraft failed. The student was returning from Spanish Fork Municipal Airport Woodhouse Field when the accident occurred. The aircraft came to rest 500 feet short of the runway.
- On October 26, 2009, a Pilatus PC-12 registered PH-RUL on its way to Frankfurt Egelsbach Airport crashed in a field shortly after take-off from Kempen Airport's runway 21. Two people on board died. An investigation was performed by the Dutch Safety Board; however, the cause of the accident was never conclusively determined. The aircraft was relatively new, having had its first flight in May 2009.
- On 26 October 2009, a BAe 125 executive jet RA-02807 crashed on approach to Minsk National Airport. All three crew and both passengers died.
- On 27 October 2009, an Ecuadorian Air Force HAL Dhruv helicopter crashed during display maneuvers at Mariscal Sucre International Airport, with both pilots sustaining only minor scratches and no casualties. The aircraft was flying in military formation with two other helicopters.
- On October 27, 2009, a single-engine Beechcraft crashed. The aircraft landed north of the airport, but not on the runway. It skidded through the fence and came to rest in the parking lot of Great Lakes Aviation, just outside the airfield. The aircraft was reported to be en route to Muskoka, Ontario when it experienced some mechanical problem and then crash landed at the north end of the runway. The pilot, who was also the only occupant, died in the accident.
- On 29 October 2009, a Brazilian Air Force Cessna 208 Caravan registration FAB-2725 en route from Cruzeiro do Sul to Tabatinga made an emergency landing on a river due engine failure. Of the 11 occupants, 1 passenger and 1 crew member died.

== November ==
- On November 1, 2009, a Beech 77 Skipper crashed while approaching the Gainesville Regional Airport. During the roundout and flare, the airplane veered left and its right wing lifted. The pilot initiated a go-around, but the airplane was "already in a stall" and impacted a sign before ultimately coming to rest in the grass. The probable cause of the accident was found to be the pilot's failure to maintain aircraft control during landing.
- On 1 November 2009, an Ilyushin Il-76 cargo jet of the Russian Ministry of Internal Affairs crashed shortly after take-off from Mirny airport, killing all 11 people on board. It was on a repositioning flight to Irkutsk Airport after delivering cargo to Mirny. The Il-76 banked to the right and crashed into the ground near the Mir mine.
- On 3 November 2009, Air Zimbabwe Xian MA60 performing flight UM-239 hit five warthogs on take-off. The take-off was rejected but the undercarriage collapsed, causing substantial damage to the aircraft.
- On 5 November 2009, Grumman Albatross N120FB of Albatross Adventures crashed when an engine failed shortly after take-off. The aircraft was damaged beyond economic repair.
- On November 8, 2009, a Cessna 150 crashed while practicing landings at Galion Municipal Airport. A student pilot performed two landings at the airport with a flight instructor aboard the airplane before the student pilot attempted a solo landing on runway 23. Upon touchdown during the solo flight, the airplane turned into the wind and veered off the left side of the runway where it struck a visual approach slope indicator. The probable cause of the accident was found to be the student pilot's failure to maintain directional control.
- On November 9, 2009, a Beechcraft 1900D of Bluebird Aviation crashed during a single-engine landing at Wilson Airport in Nairobi, Kenya, killing the captain and seriously injuring the first officer.
- On 18 November 2009, Iran Air Fokker 100 EP-CFO suffered an undercarriage malfunction on take-off. The aircraft was on a flight to Mehrabad Airport, Tehran when the undercarriage failed to retract. The aircraft landed at Isfahan but was substantially damaged when the left main gear collapsed.
- On 19 November 2009, Compagnie Africaine d'Aviation Flight 3711, operated by McDonnell Douglas MD-82 (registration 9Q-CAB) bound from Kinshasa overran the runway on landing, suffering substantial damage. The overrun area was contaminated by solidified lava.
- On 20 November 2009, an AW109E Power of Air ambulances in Poland crashed during landing.
- On 23 November 2009, Italian Air Force Lockheed KC-130J Hercules MM62176 of the based 46 Aerobrigata crashed just after take-off. All five crew members were killed.
- On 27 November 2009, Batavia Air Flight 711, operated by a Boeing 737-400 made an emergency landing after a problem was discovered with the landing gear. The crew and passengers on board remained unhurt.
- On 28 November 2009, an Avient Aviation McDonnell Douglas MD-11F cargo plane registered to Zimbabwe (registration: Z-BAV) departing for Bishkek, Kyrgyzstan crashed into a warehouse near the runway of the airport due to a tailstrike that caught fire during takeoff and broke into several pieces with seven people on board. Three people died and four were injured.
- On 29 November 2009, a DHC-2 Beaver operated by Seair crashed off the coast of Saturna Island. The accident occurred at approximately 4:10 p.m local time. Six passengers (including one infant) died, but the pilot and one other passenger survived.

== December ==
- On 2 December 2009, Merpati Nusantara Airlines Fokker 100 PK-MJD made an emergency landing when the left main gear failed to extend. There were no injuries among the passengers and crew on board.
- On 3 December 2009 – A restored Spitfire tipped onto its nose while landing, damaging the propeller and undercarriage.
- On December 7, 2009: A Piper PA-46-500TP, registration number N600YE, impacted terrain near Mendoza, Texas, in a steep descending right turn during an ILS approach in low visibility, substantially damaging the aircraft and killing the pilot and single passenger. Immediately prior to the crash, an air traffic controller had instructed the pilot to perform a "combination of descending turns" and "heading changes [that] were rapid [and] of large magnitude..." Additionally, post-crash toxicological tests of the pilot found evidence of diphenhydramine, a sedating antihistamine. The accident was attributed to "The pilot's spatial disorientation, which resulted in his loss of airplane control. Contributing to the pilot's spatial disorientation was the sequence and timing of the instructions issued by the air traffic controller. The pilot's operation of the airplane after using impairing medication may also have contributed."
- On 7 December 2009, an Embraer ERJ 135 (registration ZS-SJW) operated by Airlink on a scheduled flight (SA-8625) overran the runway in wet conditions and ended up on a public road (the R404). There were no fatalities, but the plane suffered substantial damage. The accident was caused by an incorrect sealant used on the runway, and the airline was cleared of all blame. Airlink's insurers took legal action against the state-owned Airports Company of South Africa.
- On December 22, 2009, American Airlines Flight 331, a Boeing 737-800, overran the runway while landing at Norman Manley International Airport in Kingston, Jamaica during heavy rain. The aircraft came to rest on an access road just short of the Caribbean Sea, with its fuselage broken in three. There were no deaths, but 85 of the 154 people on board were injured.
- On 31 December 2009, a Fletcher FU 24-950 operated by Sinar Mas Land on an aerial fertilisation flight from Pangkalpinang to Pangkalan Bun, with a scheduled stop at Ketapang, experienced mechanical failure shortly after takeoff from Rahadi Oesman Airport. The aircraft subsequently lost control and crashed into Agoesdjam Hospital, located approximately 2 km from the airport, killing both occupants. No one on the ground was injured, although part of the hospital's emergency room and a nearby Toyota Avanza were damaged in the crash.
