= List of airports in Venezuela =

Map of Venezuela

Venezuela, officially known as the Bolivarian Republic of Venezuela (Spanish: República Bolivariana de Venezuela), is a country on the northern coast of South America. It is a continental mainland with numerous islands located off its coastline in the Caribbean Sea. Venezuela borders Guyana to the east of the Essequibo River, Brazil to the south, and Colombia to the west. Trinidad and Tobago, Grenada, St. Lucia, Barbados, Curaçao, Bonaire, Aruba, Saint Vincent and the Grenadines and the Leeward Antilles lie just north, off the Venezuelan coast.

== Airports ==
=== Public airports ===
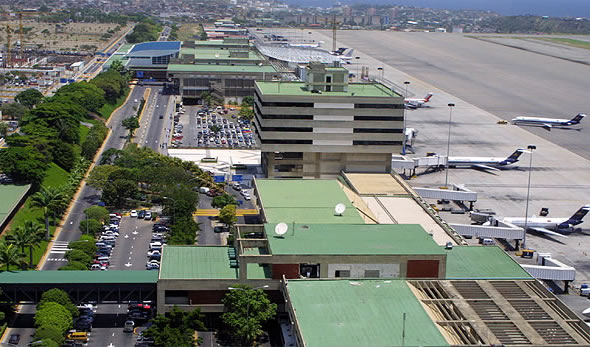
National and international terminal of the Maiquetia's Simon Bolivar International airport.

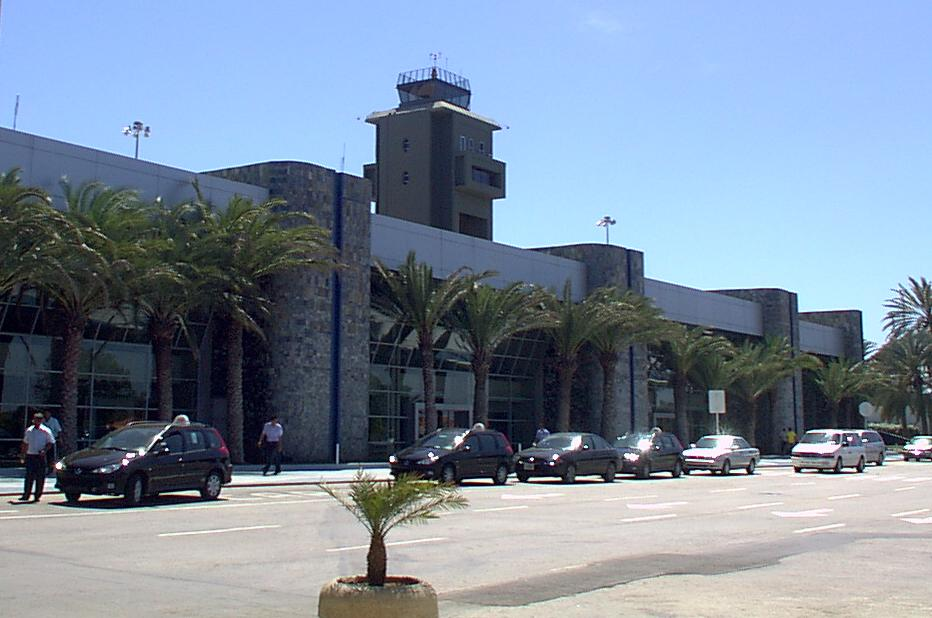
View from outside Del Caribe "Santiago Mariño" International Airport.

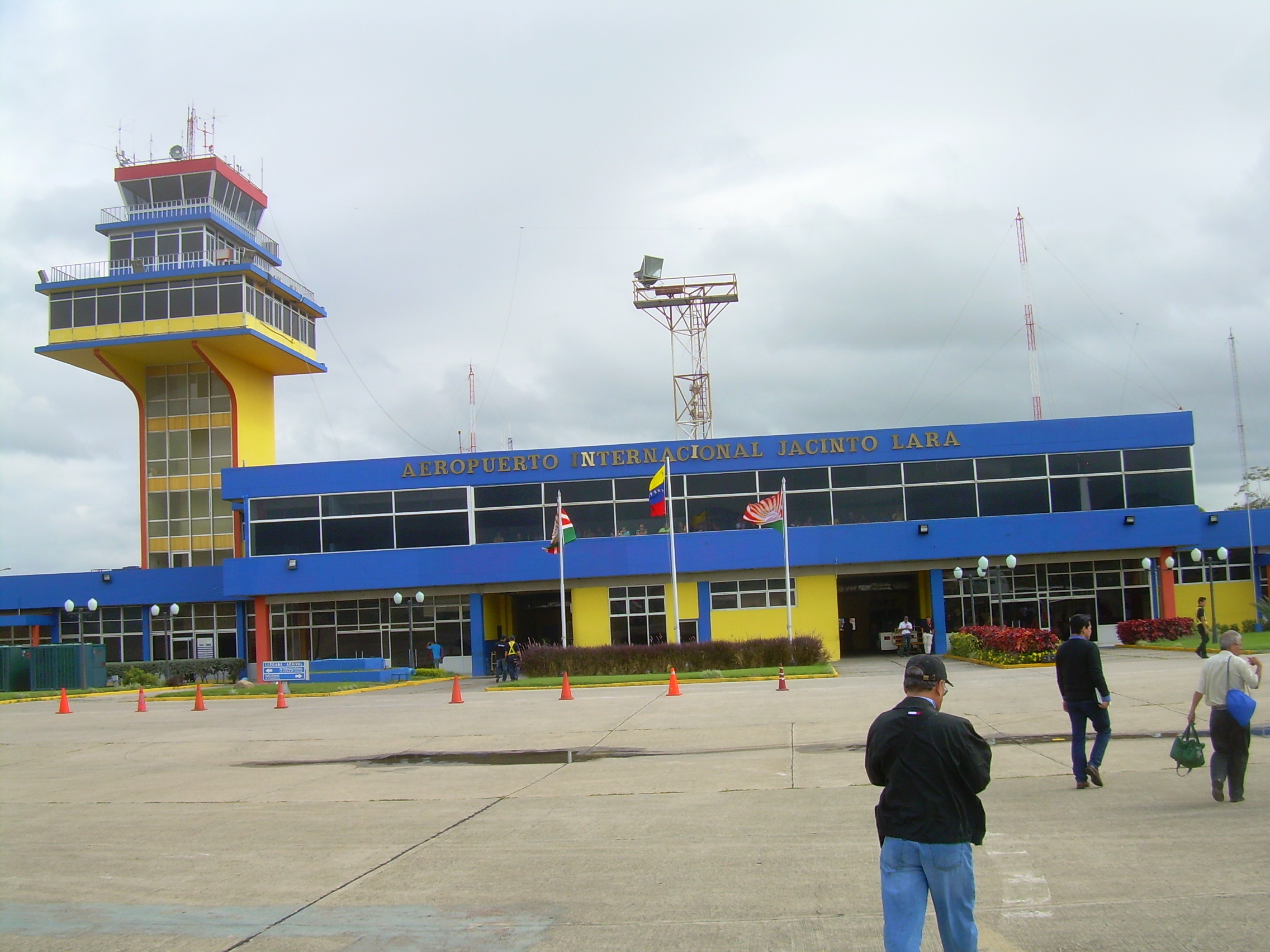
Terminal building and control tower of Jacinto Lara International Airport.

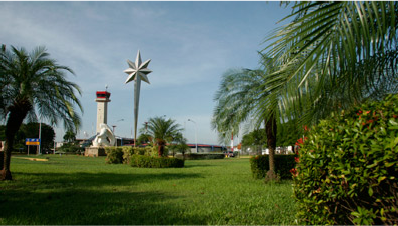
Panoramic view of La Chinita International Airport.

| Airport | ICAO | IATA | City served / Location | State |
|---|---|---|---|---|
| Oswaldo Guevara Mujica Airport | SVAC | AGV | Acarigua | Portuguesa |
| Anaco Airport | SVAN | AAO | Anaco | Anzoátegui |
| General José Antonio Anzoátegui International Airport | SVBC | BLA | Barcelona | Anzoátegui |
| Barinas Airport | SVBI | BNS | Barinas | Barinas |
| Jacinto Lara International Airport | SVBM | BRM | Barquisimeto | Lara |
| Mariscal Sucre Airport | SVBS | MYC | Maracay | Aragua |
| Tomás de Heres Airport | SVCB | CBL | Ciudad Bolívar | Bolívar |
| Caicara del Orinoco Airport | SVCD | CXA | Caicara del Orinoco | Bolívar |
| El Cubo Airport | SVCG | CUV | Casigua-El Cubo | Zulia |
| Calabozo Airport | SVCL | CLZ | Calabozo | Guárico |
| Canaima Airport | SVCN | CAJ | Canaima | Bolívar |
| Carora Airport | SVCO | VCR | Carora | Lara |
| General José Francisco Bermúdez Airport | SVCP | CUP | Carúpano | Sucre |
| Óscar Machado Zuloaga International Airport | SVCS | | Charallave | Miranda |
| José Leonardo Chirino Airport | SVCR | CZE | Coro | Falcón |
| Antonio José de Sucre Airport | SVCU | CUM | Cumaná | Sucre |
| Divina Pastora Airport | SVDP | | Divina Pastora | Bolívar |
| El Dorado Airport | SVED | EOR | El Dorado | Bolívar |
| Elorza Airport | SVEZ | EOZ | Elorza | Apure |
| Guanare Airport | SVGU | GUQ | Guanare | Portuguesa |
| Guasdualito Airport | SVGD | GDO | Guasdualito | Apure |
| Guasipati Airport | SVGT | | Guasipati | Bolívar |
| Güiria Airport | SVGI | GUI | Güiria | Sucre |
| Higuerote Airport | SVHG | HGE | Higuerote | Miranda |
| Icabarú Airport | SVIC | ICA | Icabarú | Bolívar |
| Andrés Miguel Salazar Marcano Airport | SVIE | ICC | Isla de Coche | Nueva Esparta |
| Kamarata Airport | SVKM | KTV | Kamarata | Bolívar |
| Kavanayén Airport | SVKA | KAV | Kavanayén | Bolívar |
| La Fría Airport | SVLF | LFR | La Fría | Táchira |
| La Orchila Airport | SVLO | | La Orchila | Federal Dependencies |
| La Chinita International Airport | SVMC | MAR | Maracaibo | Zulia |
| Simón Bolívar International Airport | SVMI | CCS | Caracas / Maiquetía | Capital District / Vargas |
| Metropolitano International Airport | SVMP | | Ocumare del Tuy | Miranda |
| Maturín Airport | SVMT | MUN | Maturín | Monagas |
| Alberto Carnevalli Airport | SVMD | MRD | Mérida | Mérida |
| Parai-tepuí Airport | SVPX | PPH | Parai-tepuí | Bolívar |
| Santiago Mariño Caribbean International Airport | SVMG | PMV | Porlamar | Nueva Esparta |
| Oro Negro Airport | SVON | CBS | Cabimas | Zulia |
| Puerto Páez Airport | | PPZ | Puerto Páez | Apure |
| Josefa Camejo International Airport | SVJC | LSP | Punto Fijo, Paraguaná Peninsula | Falcón |
| San Carlos Airport | SVCJ | | San Carlos | Cojedes |
| Guarico Municipal Airport | SVJM | | San Juan de los Morros | Guárico |
| Cacique Aramare Airport | SVPA | PYH | Puerto Ayacucho | Amazonas |
| General Bartolomé Salom Airport | SVPC | PBL | Puerto Cabello | Carabobo |
| Pedernales Airport | SVPE | PDZ | Pedernales | Delta Amacuro |
| Paramillo Airport | SVPM | SCI | San Cristóbal | Táchira |
| Manuel Carlos Piar Guayana Airport | SVPR | PZO | Ciudad Guayana / Puerto Ordaz | Bolívar |
| Palmarito Airport | SVPT | PTM | Palmarito | Apure |
| Los Roques Airport | SVRS | LRV | Los Roques | Federal Dependencies |
| Juan Vicente Gómez International Airport | SVSA | SVZ | San Antonio del Táchira | Táchira |
| Santa Bárbara de Barinas Airport | SVSB | SBB | Santa Bárbara | Barinas |
| Santa Elena de Uairén Airport | SVSE | SNV | Santa Elena de Uairén | Bolívar |
| Mayor Buenaventura Vivas Airport | SVSO | STD | Santo Domingo | Táchira |
| Sub Teniente Nestor Arias Airport | SVSP | SNF | San Felipe | Yaracuy |
| Las Flecheras Airport | SVSR | SFD | San Fernando de Apure | Apure |
| San Tomé Airport | SVST | SOM | San Tomé | Anzoátegui |
| Miguel Urdaneta Fernández Airport | SVSZ | STB | Santa Bárbara del Zulia | Zulia |
| San Rafael Airport | SVTC | TUV | Tucupita | Delta Amacuro |
| Tumeremo Airport | SVTM | TMO | Tumeremo | Bolívar |
| Uonquén Airport (Uon-Quen Airport) | SVUQ | | Uonquén (Uon-Quen) | Bolívar |
| Uriman Airport | SVUM | URM | Uriman | Bolívar |
| Arturo Michelena International Airport | SVVA | VLN | Valencia | Carabobo |
| Juan Pablo Pérez Alfonzo Airport | SVVG | VIG | El Vigía | Mérida |
| Dr. Antonio Nicolás Briceño Airport | SVVL | VLV | Valera | Trujillo |
| Valle de la Pascua Airport | SVVP | VDP | Valle de la Pascua | Guárico |
Airports with unverified coordinates
| San Lorenzo De Barinas Airport | SVOA | | San Lorenzo De Barinas | Barinas |
| Temblador Airport | SVTR | | Temblador | Monagas |

=== Military airports ===
| Airport | ICAO | IATA | City served / Location | State |
|---|---|---|---|---|
| El Libertador Air Base | SVBL | | Maracay | Aragua |
| Generalissimo Francisco de Miranda Air Base | SVFM | | Caracas | Capital District |
| Captain Manuel Ríos Aerospace Base | SVCZ | | Barbacoas | Aragua |

== See also ==
- Transport in Venezuela
- Venezuelan Air Force (Aviación Militar Venezolana, formerly Fuerza Aérea Venezolana)
- List of airports by ICAO code: S#SV - Venezuela
- Wikipedia: WikiProject Aviation/Airline destination lists: South America#Venezuela
