= Elorza Airport =

- IATA: EOZ; ICAO: SVEZ

Summary
- Airport type: Public
- Serves: Elorza
- Elevation AMSL: 295 ft / 90 m
- Coordinates: 7°03′35″N 69°29′50″W

Map
- Location of the airport in Venezuela

Runways
Direction	Length		Surface
Direction	m	ft	Surface
09/27	1,200	3,937	Asphalt
- Sources: GCM Google Maps

Elorza Airport (IATA: EOZ, ICAO: SVEZ) is an airport serving the town of Elorza in the Apure state of Venezuela. The runway is in the middle of the town.

The Elorza non-directional beacon (Ident: EZA) is located on the field.

== See also ==
- Transport in Venezuela
- List of airports in Venezuela
