= La Orchila Airport =

- IATA: none; ICAO: SVLO

Summary
- Airport type: Public
- Serves: La Orchila
- Elevation AMSL: 5 ft / 2 m
- Coordinates: 11°48′30″N 66°10′48″W

Map
- Location of the airport in Venezuela

Runways
Direction	Length		Surface
Direction	m	ft	Surface
08/26	3,000	9,843	Asphalt
- Sources: GCM Google Maps

La Orchila Airport (ICAO: SVLO) is an airport serving the island of La Orchila in the Caribbean Sea 130 kilometres (81 mi) north of the Venezuelan coast. La Orchila is in the Federal Dependencies of Venezuela.

The La Orchila VOR-DME (Ident: LOR) is located on the field.

== See also ==
- Transport in Venezuela
- List of airports in Venezuela
