= Cubo =

Cubo may refer to:

- Cubo Architects, a Danish architectural practice
- Cubo Line, part of the defense system built by the Spanish to protect the presidio of St. Augustine
- Casigua-El Cubo, Zulia, Venezuela, a city
  - El Cubo Airport, an airport serving the city
- Erick Torres Padilla (born 1993), Mexican professional football player, nicknamed "El Cubo"
- Miguel Cubo (born 2008), Spanish footballer

== See also ==
- Cubo-Futurism, an art movement in the 20th century in Russia
- Qubo (disambiguation)
