= Kavanayén Airport =

Kavanayen Airport
- IATA: KAV; ICAO: SVKA

Summary
- Airport type: Private
- Serves: Kavanayén, Venezuela
- Elevation AMSL: 3,900 ft / 1,189 m
- Coordinates: 5°35′35″N 61°45′48″W

Map
- Location of airport in Venezuela

Runways
Direction	Length		Surface
Direction	m	ft	Surface
16/34	1,040	3,412	Gravel
- Source: Bing Maps GCM SkyVector

Kavanayen Airport (IATA: KAV, ICAO: SVKA) is an airstrip serving Kavanayén, an isolated village in the Bolívar State of Venezuela. The village is on the edge of a mesa, and the airstrip parallels the edge, 300 metres (980 ft) north of a 200-metre (660 ft) drop.

The Kavanayen non-directional beacon (Ident: KAV) is located 3.3 nautical miles (6 km) southeast of the runway.

== See also ==
- Transport in Venezuela
- List of airports in Venezuela
