= List of airports by IATA code: V =

IATA	ICAO	Airport name	Location served
-VA-
VAA	EFVA	Vaasa Airport	Vaasa, Finland
VAB		Yavarate Airport	Yavarate, Colombia
VAC	EDWU	Varrelbusch Airport	Cloppenburg, Lower Saxony, Germany
VAD	KVAD	Moody Air Force Base	Valdosta, Georgia, United States
VAF	LFLU	Valence-Chabeuil Airport	Valence, Rhône-Alpes, France
VAG	SBVG	Major Brigadeiro Trompowsky Airport	Varginha, Minas Gerais, Brazil
VAH	SLVG	Cap. Av. Vidal Villagomez Toledo Airport	Vallegrande, Bolivia
VAI	AYVN	Vanimo Airport	Vanimo, Papua New Guinea
VAK	PAVA	Chevak Airport	Chevak, Alaska, United States
VAL	SNVB	Valença Airport	Valença, Bahia, Brazil
VAM	VRMV	Villa International Airport Maamigili	Maamigili, Maldives
VAN	LTCI	Van Ferit Melen Airport	Van, Turkey
VAO	AGGV	Suavanao Airport	Suavanao, Solomon Islands
VAP	SCRD	Rodelillo Airfield	Valparaíso, Chile
VAR	LBWN	Varna Airport	Varna, Bulgaria
VAS	LTAR	Sivas Airport	Sivas, Turkey
VAT	FMMY	Vatomandry Airport	Vatomandry, Madagascar
VAU	NFNV	Vatukoula Airport	Vatukoula, Fiji
VAV	NFTV	Vavaʻu International Airport	Vavaʻu, Tonga
VAW	ENSS	Vardø Airport, Svartnes	Vardø, Norway
-VB-
VBA	VYAN	Ann Airport	Ann, Myanmar
VBC	VYCZ	Mandalay Chanmyathazi Airport	Mandalay, Myanmar
VBG	KVBG	Vandenberg Air Force Base	Lompoc, California, United States
VBP	VYBP	Bokpyin Airport	Bokpyin, Myanmar
VBS	LIPO	Brescia Airport (Gabriele D'Annunzio Airport)	Brescia, Lombardy, Italy
VBV	NFVB	Vanuabalavu Airport	Vanua Balavu, Fiji
VBY	ESSV	Visby Airport	Visby, Sweden
-VC-
VCA	VVCT	Can Tho International Airport	Can Tho (Cần Thơ), Vietnam
VCD	YVRD	Victoria River Downs Airport	Victoria River Downs Station, Northern Territory, Australia
VCE	LIPZ	Venice Marco Polo Airport	Venice, Veneto, Italy
VCF		Valcheta Airport	Valcheta, Río Negro, Argentina
VCH	SUVO	Vichadero Airport	Vichadero, Uruguay
VCL	VVCA	Chu Lai International Airport	Chu Lai, Vietnam
VCP	SBKP	Viracopos/Campinas International Airport	São Paulo / Campinas, São Paulo, Brazil
VCR	SVCO	Carora Airport	Carora, Venezuela
VCS	VVCS	Con Dao Airport (Cỏ Ống Airport)	Con Dao Island (Côn Đảo), Vietnam
VCT	KVCT	Victoria Regional Airport	Victoria, Texas, United States
VCV	KVCV	Southern California Logistics Airport	Victorville, California, United States
-VD-
VDA	LLOV	Ovda Airport	Ovda (Uvda), Israel
VDB	ENFG	Fagernes Airport, Leirin	Fagernes, Norway
VDC	SSVC	Glauber Rocha Airport	Vitória da Conquista, Bahia, Brazil
VDE	GCHI	El Hierro Airport	Valverde, Canary Islands, Spain
VDH	VVDH	Dong Hoi Airport	Dong Hoi (Đồng Hới), Vietnam
VDI	KVDI	Vidalia Regional Airport	Vidalia, Georgia, United States
VDM	SAVV	Gobernador Edgardo Castello Airport	Viedma, Río Negro, Argentina
VDO	VVVD	Van Don International Airport	Ha Long, Quang Ninh (Quảng Ninh), Vietnam
VDP	SVVP	Valle de la Pascua Airport	Valle de la Pascua, Venezuela
VDR	SAOD	Villa Dolores Airport	Villa Dolores, Córdoba, Argentina
VDS	ENVD	Vadsø Airport	Vadsø, Norway
VDY	VOJV	Vidyanagar Airport (Jindal Airport)	Toranagallu, Karnataka, India
VDZ	PAVD	Valdez Airport (Pioneer Field)	Valdez, Alaska, United States
-VE-
VEE	PAVE	Venetie Airport	Venetie, Alaska, United States
VEG	SYMK	Maikwak Airport	Maikwak, Guyana
VEL	KVEL	Vernal Regional Airport	Vernal, Utah, United States
VER	MMVR	Veracruz International Airport	Veracruz, Veracruz, Mexico
VEV	AGBA	Barakoma Airport	Barakoma, Solomon Islands
VEX		Tioga Municipal Airport (FAA: D60)	Tioga, North Dakota, United States
VEY	BIVM	Vestmannaeyjar Airport	Vestmannaeyjar, Iceland
-VF-
VFA	FVFA	Victoria Falls Airport	Victoria Falls, Zimbabwe
-VG-
VGA	VOBZ	NTR Amaravati International Airport	Vijayawada, Andhra Pradesh, India
VGD	ULWW	Vologda Airport	Vologda, Vologda Oblast, Russia
VGO	LEVX	Vigo–Peinador Airport	Vigo, Galicia, Spain
VGS		General Villegas Airport	General Villegas, Buenos Aires, Argentina
VGT	KVGT	North Las Vegas Airport	Las Vegas, Nevada, United States
VGZ	SKVG	Villa Garzón Airport	Villagarzón, Colombia
-VH-
VHC	FNSA	Henrique de Carvalho Airport	Saurimo, Angola
VHM	ESNV	Vilhelmina Airport	Vilhelmina, Sweden
VHN	KVHN	Culberson County Airport	Van Horn, Texas, United States
VHV	UENI	Verkhnevilyuysk Airport	Verkhnevilyuysk, Yakutia, Russia
VHY	LFLV	Vichy — Charmeil Airport	Vichy, Auvergne, France
VHZ	NTUV	Vahitahi Airport	Vahitahi, Tuamotus, French Polynesia
-VI-
VIA	SSVI	Ângelo Ponzoni Municipal Airport	Videira, Santa Catarina, Brazil
VIB		Villa Constitución Airport	Ciudad Constitución, Baja California Sur, Mexico
VIC	LIPT	Vicenza Airport	Vicenza, Veneto, Italy
VIE	LOWW	Vienna International Airport	Vienna, Austria
VIG	SVVG	Juan Pablo Pérez Alfonzo Airport	El Vigía, Venezuela
VIH	KVIH	Rolla National Airport	Rolla / Vichy, Missouri, United States
VII	VVVH	Vinh International Airport	Vinh, Vietnam
VIJ	TUPW	Virgin Gorda Airport	Virgin Gorda, British Overseas Territory of Virgin Islands
VIL	GMMH	Dakhla Airport	Dakhla, Morocco
VIN	UKWW	Havryshivka Vinnytsia International Airport	Vinnytsia, Ukraine
VIQ	WPVQ	Viqueque Airport	Viqueque, East Timor
VIR	FAVG	Virginia Airport	Durban, South Africa
VIS	KVIS	Visalia Municipal Airport	Visalia, California, United States
VIT	LEVT	Vitoria Airport	Vitoria-Gasteiz, Basque Country, Spain
VIU		Viru Harbour Airport	Viru Harbour, Solomon Islands
VIV		Vivigani Airfield	Vivigani, Papua New Guinea
VIX	SBVT	Eurico de Aguiar Salles Airport	Vitória, Espírito Santo, Brazil
VIY	LFPV	Vélizy – Villacoublay Air Base	Paris, Île-de-France, France
-VJ-
VJB	FQXA	Xai-Xai Airport	Xai-Xai, Mozambique
VJI	KVJI	Virginia Highlands Airport	Abingdon, Virginia, United States
VJQ		Gurúé Airport	Gurúè, Mozambique
-VK-
VKG	VVRG	Rach Gia Airport	Rach Gia (Rạch Giá), Vietnam
VKO	UUWW	Vnukovo International Airport	Moscow, Russia
VKS	KVKS	Vicksburg Municipal Airport	Vicksburg, Mississippi, United States
VKT	UUYW	Vorkuta Airport	Vorkuta, Komi Republic, Russia
-VL-
VLA	KVLA	Vandalia Municipal Airport	Vandalia, Illinois, United States
VLC	LEVC	Valencia Airport	Valencia, Valencian Community, Spain
VLD	KVLD	Valdosta Regional Airport	Valdosta, Georgia, United States
VLE		Valle Airport (FAA: 40G)	Grand Canyon, Arizona, United States
VLG	SAZV	Villa Gesell Airport	Villa Gesell, Buenos Aires, Argentina
VLI	NVVV	Bauerfield International Airport	Port Vila, Vanuatu
VLK	URRY	Volgodonsk Airport	Volgodonsk, Rostov Oblast, Russia
VLL	LEVD	Valladolid Airport	Valladolid, Castile and León, Spain
VLM	SLVM	Lieutenant Colonel Rafael Pabón Airport	Villamontes, Bolivia
VLN	SVVA	Arturo Michelena International Airport	Valencia, Venezuela
VLO	LAVL	Vlora International Airport	Vlorë, Albania
VLP		Vila Rica Municipal Airport	Vila Rica, Mato Grosso, Brazil
VLR	SCLL	Vallenar Airport	Vallenar, Chile
VLS	NVSV	Valesdir Airport	Valesdir, Vanuatu
VLU	ULOL	Velikiye Luki Airport	Velikiye Luki, Pskov Oblast, Russia
VLV	SVVL	Dr. Antonio Nicolás Briceño Airport	Valera, Venezuela
VLY	EGOV	Anglesey Airport / RAF Valley	Anglesey, Wales, United Kingdom
-VM-
VME	SAOR	Villa Reynolds Airport	Villa Mercedes, San Luis, Argentina
VMI		Dr. Juan Plate Airport	Puerto Valle-Mi, Paraguay
VMU	AYBA	Baimuru Airport	Baimuru, Papua New Guinea
-VN-
VNA	VLSV	Salavan Airport	Salavan (Saravane), Laos
VNC	KVNC	Venice Municipal Airport	Venice, Florida, United States
VND	FMSU	Vangaindrano Airport	Vangaindrano, Madagascar
VNE	LFRV	Meucon Airport	Vannes, Brittany, France
VNO	EYVI	Vilnius Airport	Vilnius, Lithuania
VNR	YVRS	Vanrook Airport	Vanrook Station, Queensland, Australia
VNS	VEBN	Lal Bahadur Shastri Airport	Varanasi, Uttar Pradesh, India
VNT	EVVA	Ventspils International Airport	Ventspils, Latvia
VNX	FQVL	Vilankulo Airport	Vilankulo, Mozambique
VNY	KVNY	Van Nuys Airport	Los Angeles, California, United States
-VO-
VOD	LKVO	Vodochody Airport	Prague, Czech Republic
VOG	URWW	Volgograd International Airport	Volgograd, Volgograd Oblast, Russia
VOH	FMNV	Vohemar Airport	Vohemar (Vohimarina), Madagascar
VOI	GLVA	Voinjama Airport (Tenebu Airport)	Voinjama, Liberia
VOK	KVOK	Volk Field Air National Guard Base	Camp Douglas, Wisconsin, United States
VOL	LGBL	Nea Anchialos National Airport	Volos, Greece
VOT	SDVG	Votuporanga Airport (Domingos Pignatari Airport)	Votuporanga, São Paulo, Brazil
VOZ	UUOO	Voronezh International Airport (Chertovitskoye Airport)	Voronezh, Voronezh Oblast, Russia
-VP-
VPE	FNGI	Ondjiva Pereira Airport	Ondjiva, Angola
VPG		Vipingo Airport	Vipingo, Kenya
VPN	BIVO	Vopnafjörður Airport	Vopnafjörður, Iceland
VPS	KVPS	Destin–Fort Walton Beach Airport / Eglin Air Force Base	Destin / Fort Walton Beach, Florida, United States
VPY	FQCH	Chimoio Airport	Chimoio, Mozambique
VPZ	KVPZ	Porter County Regional Airport	Valparaiso, Indiana, United States
-VQ-
VQQ	KVQQ	Cecil Airport	Jacksonville, Florida, United States
VQS	TJVQ	Antonio Rivera Rodríguez Airport	Vieques, Puerto Rico, United States
-VR-
VRA	MUVR	Juan Gualberto Gómez Airport	Varadero, Cuba
VRB	KVRB	Vero Beach Regional Airport	Vero Beach, Florida, United States
VRC	RPUV	Virac Airport	Virac, Philippines
VRE	FAVR	Vredendal Airport	Vredendal, South Africa
VRI	ULDW	Varandey Airport	Varandey, Nenets Autonomous Okrug, Russia
VRK	EFVR	Varkaus Airport	Varkaus, Finland
VRL	LPVR	Vila Real Airport	Vila Real, Portugal
VRN	LIPX	Verona Villafranca Airport	Verona, Veneto, Italy
VRO	MUKW	Kawama Airport	Varadero, Cuba
VRS		Roy Otten Memorial Airfield (FAA: 3VS)	Versailles, Missouri, United States
VRU	FAVB	Vryburg Airport	Vryburg, South Africa
-VS-
VSA	MMVA	Villahermosa International Airport	Villahermosa, Tabasco, Mexico
VSE	LPVZ	Viseu Airport	Viseu, Portugal
VSF	KVSF	Hartness State Airport	Springfield, Vermont, United States
VSG	UKCW	Luhansk International Airport	Luhansk, Ukraine
VST	ESOW	Stockholm Västerås Airport	Stockholm / Västerås, Sweden
VSV	VISV	Shravasti Airport	Shravasti, India
-VT-
VTB	UMII	Vitebsk Vostochny Airport	Vitebsk, Belarus
VTE	VLVT	Wattay International Airport	Vientiane, Laos
VTF	NFVL	Vatulele Airport	Vatulele, Fiji
VTG	VVVT	Vung Tau Airport	Vung Tau (Vũng Tàu), Vietnam
VTL	LFSZ	Vittel - Champ-de-Courses Airport	Vittel, Lorraine, France
VTM	LLNV	Nevatim Airbase	Nevatim, Israel
VTN	KVTN	Miller Field	Valentine, Nebraska, United States
VTU	MUVT	Hermanos Ameijeiras Airport	Las Tunas, Cuba
VTZ	VOVI	Alluri Sitarama Raju International Airport	Visakhapatnam (Vishakhapatnam), Andhra Pradesh, India
-VU-
VUP	SKVP	Alfonso López Pumarejo Airport	Valledupar, Colombia
VUS	ULWU	Veliky Ustyug Airport	Veliky Ustyug, Vologda Oblast, Russia
VUU		Mvuu Camp Airport	Liwonde, Malawi
-VV-
VVB	FMMH	Mahanoro Airport	Mahanoro, Madagascar
VVC	SKVV	La Vanguardia Airport	Villavicencio, Colombia
VVI	SLVR	Viru Viru International Airport	Santa Cruz de la Sierra, Bolivia
VVK	ESSW	Västervik Airport	Västervik, Sweden
VVN		Las Malvinas Airport	Las Malvinas, Peru
VVO	UHWW	Vladivostok International Airport	Vladivostok, Primorsky Krai, Russia
VVZ	DAAP	Takhamalt Airport	Illizi, Algeria
-VX-
VXC	FQLC	Lichinga Airport	Lichinga, Mozambique
VXE	GVSV	Cesária Évora Airport (São Pedro Airport)	São Vicente, Cape Verde
VXO	ESMX	Växjö/Kronoberg Airport	Växjö, Sweden
-VY-
VYD	FAVY	Vryheid Airport	Vryheid, South Africa
VYI	UENW	Vilyuysk Airport	Vilyuysk, Yakutia, Russia
VYS	KVYS	Illinois Valley Regional Airport (Walter A. Duncan Field)	Peru, Illinois, United States
