= Guasdualito Airport =

Guasdualito Airport Vare Maria Airport
- IATA: GDO; ICAO: SVGD

Summary
- Airport type: Public
- Serves: Guasdualito, Venezuela
- Elevation AMSL: 426 ft (130 m)
- Coordinates: 7°12′40″N 70°45′25″W

Map
- Location of the airport in Venezuela

Runways
Direction	Length		Surface
Direction	m	ft	Surface
06/24	2,060	6,759	Asphalt
- Sources: GCM

Guasdualito Airport (IATA: GDO, ICAO: SVGD), also known as Vare Maria Airport, is an airport serving Guasdualito in the Apure state of Venezuela. The runway is 4 kilometres (2.5 mi) southwest of the city.

== Incidents ==
- On February 15, 2009, a Cessna 208B Grand Caravan (registered YV1950) overran the runway at the airport following a domestic flight from Las Flecheras Airport. The airplane sustained damage to the propeller and the underside of the fuselage.

== See also ==
- Transport in Venezuela
- List of airports in Venezuela
