= Icabarú Airport =

- IATA: ICA; ICAO: SVIC

Summary
- Airport type: Public
- Serves: Icabarú
- Elevation AMSL: 1,574 ft / 480 m
- Coordinates: 4°20′15″N 61°44′20″W

Map
- Location of the airport in Venezuela

Runways
| Direction | Length | | Surface |
| Direction | m | ft | Surface |
|---|---|---|---|
| 06/24 | 1,170 | 3,839 | Dirt |
- Sources: GCM Google Maps

Icabarú Airport (IATA: ICA, ICAO: SVIC) is an airport serving the village of Icabarú in the Bolívar state of Venezuela.

The Icabaru non-directional beacon (Ident: ICA) is located on the field.

== See also ==
- Transport in Venezuela
- List of airports in Venezuela
