= San Carlos Airport (Venezuela) =

San Carlos Airport Ezequiel Zamora Airport
- IATA: none; ICAO: SVCJ

Summary
- Airport type: Public
- Operator: Government
- Location: San Carlos, Venezuela
- Elevation AMSL: 512 ft / 156 m
- Coordinates: 9°38′55″N 68°34′30″W

Map
- Location of the airport in Venezuela

Runways
Direction	Length		Surface
Direction	m	ft	Surface
15/33	1,715	5,627	Asphalt
- Sources: GCM Google Maps

San Carlos Airport (IATA: SVCJ) is an airport serving San Carlos, the capital of Cojedes state in Venezuela. It is also known as Aeropuerto Ezquiel Zamora. Runway length does not include a 300-metre (980 ft) displaced threshold on Runway 15.

== See also ==
- Transport in Venezuela
- List of airports in Venezuela
