= CXA =

CXA may refer to:

- Caicara del Orinoco Airport (IATA airport code CXA)
- XiamenAir, a Chinese passenger airline based in Xiamen, Fujian Province (IATA airline code CXA)
- Chinese Xiangqi Association, a member of the All-China Sports Federation promoting xiangqi
