= Pastora (disambiguation) =

La Pastora, Spanish: the shepherdess, may refer to:

== People ==
=== Given name ===
- Pastora Filigrana (born 1981), Spanish Roma labour lawyer, trade unionist, feminist, columnist, and human rights activist
- Pastora Imperio (1887-1979), artistic name of Pastora Rojas Monje, Spanish dancer
- Pastora Peña (1920–2003), Spanish film actress
- Pastora Soler (born 1978), Spanish singer
- Pastora Vega (born 1960), Spanish actress and television host

=== Surname ===
- Edén Pastora (1936/37 – 2020), Nicaraguan politician and guerrilla

=== Nickname ===
- La Pastora, nickname of Florencio Pla Meseguer (born Teresa Pla Meseguer, 1917–2004), was an intersex Spanish Maquis fighter.

== Places ==
- Divina Pastora, municipality in the Brazilian state of Sergipe
- La Pastora, a town in the Caaguazú department of Paraguay
- La Pastora, quarter of the city of Cabimas, Zulia State, Venezuela
- La Pastora Parish, one of the quarters of the city of Caracas

== Other ==
- Divina Pastora Airport, airstrip in the Bolívar state of Venezuela
- Divina Pastora, statue in Barquisimeto
- Dolmen de la Pastora, prehistoric passage grave at Valencina de la Concepción near Seville, Spain
- La Pastora, a Cablebús station in Mexico City
- National Shrine of La Virgen Divina Pastora, shrine in Gapan in the Philippines
- Pastora, Spanish/Catalan electronic group
- Pastora (baseball club), Venezuela
