= Metropolitano International Airport =

- IATA: none; ICAO: SVMP

Summary
- Airport type: Public
- Serves: Metropolitano
- Elevation AMSL: 574 ft / 175 m
- Coordinates: 10°08′00″N 66°47′15″W

Map
- Location of the airport in Venezuela

Runways
| Direction | Length | | Surface |
| Direction | m | ft | Surface |
|---|---|---|---|
| 08/26 | 1,420 | 4,659 | Asphalt |
- Sources: GCM

Metropolitano International Airport (ICAO: SVMP) is an airport serving the city of Ocumare del Tuy, 35 kilometres (22 mi) south of Caracas, in the Miranda state of Venezuela.

== See also ==
- Transport in Venezuela
- List of airports in Venezuela
