= PPH =

PPH may refer to

== Medicine ==
- Portopulmonary hypertension
- Postpartum hemorrhage
- Primary pulmonary hypertension, see Pulmonary hypertension
- Procedure for prolapse and hemorrhoids, see Stapled hemorrhoidectomy

== Science ==
- Pound per hour (symbol pph), mass flow unit (used in aviation to measure fuel flow, for instance)
- Part per hundred (percentage)
- People per hour, a measure of the rate of flow of people moving past a fixed point or through a system
- Propylphenidate, an analogue of methylphenidate

== Organisations ==
- Patent Prosecution Highway, a set of cooperation agreements between some patent offices
- Permanent private hall, a type of educational institution affiliated to the University of Oxford
- Palomar Pomerado Health, a public health district in San Diego County, California
- PeoplePerHour
- Portland Press Herald, a newspaper in Maine

== Transport ==
- Parai-tepuí Airport, Venezuela (by IATA code)
