= Pedernales Airport =

Pedernales Airport Pedernales/Capure Delta Amacur Airport
- IATA: PDZ; ICAO: SVPE

Summary
- Airport type: Public
- Serves: Pedernales
- Elevation AMSL: 7 ft / 2 m
- Coordinates: 9°58′40″N 62°14′00″W

Map
- Location of the airport in Venezuela

Runways
Direction	Length		Surface
Direction	m	ft	Surface
09/27	1,280	4,199	Asphalt
- Sources: GCM HERE/Nokia Maps

Pedernales Airport (IATA: PDZ, ICAO: SVPE) is an airport serving the village of Pedernales in the Delta Amacuro state of Venezuela.

Boats and the airport are the main access to Pedernales, which is on the estuary of the Caño Manamo River, and has no paved roads leading to it.

== See also ==
- Transport in Venezuela
- List of airports in Venezuela
