= PBL =

PBL may stand for:

== Sports leagues ==
- B.C. Premier Baseball League, a youth baseball league in British Columbia, Canada
- Philippine Basketball League, a men's basketball minor league in the Philippines
- Premier Basketball League, a men's professional basketball minor league in the United States
- Russian Professional Basketball League, the pre-eminent men's professional basketball league in Russia
- Premier Badminton League, a badminton league in India with players from all over the world
- Polish Basketball League

== Other uses ==
- Performance-based logistics
- Peripheral blood lymphocyte
- Perverted by Language, an album by The Fall
- Peter Lewis (businessman), an American businessman
- Phi Beta Lambda
- Philadelphia Belt Line Railroad
- Planbureau voor de Leefomgeving, Dutch name for the Netherlands Environmental Assessment Agency
- Planetary boundary layer
- Policy Block List
- Polski Blok Ludowy, the Polish name for Polish Peasant Bloc, a short lived political party in Poland
- Phenomenon-based learning
- Problem-based learning
- Project-based learning
- Protected Bike Lane
- Prototype-based language
- Publishing and Broadcasting Limited
- Public Broadcast Laboratory, a television program by National Educational Television (1967-1969)
- Puerto Bolívar Airport (ICAO: SKPB) non-directional beacon (Ident: PBL), a private airport in the Guajira Department of Colombia
- General Bartolomé Salom Airport (IATA: PBL, ICAO: SVPC), an airport serving Puerto Cabello in the Carabobo state of Venezuela
- Plasmablastic lymphoma, a type of large B-cell lymphoma
