= GUQ =

GUQ or guq may refer to:

- Georgetown University in Qatar, a campus of Georgetown University in Education City, Qatar
- GUQ, the IATA code for Guanare Airport, Venezuela
- guq, the ISO 639-3 code for Aché language, Paraguay
