= Palmarito Airport =

- IATA: PTM; ICAO: SVPT

Summary
- Airport type: Public
- Serves: Palmarito (Apure)
- Elevation AMSL: 347 ft / 106 m
- Coordinates: 7°34′30″N 70°10′30″W

Map
- Location of the airport in Venezuela

Runways
Direction	Length		Surface
Direction	m	ft	Surface
06/24	1,160	3,806	Asphalt
- Sources: GCM Google Maps

Palmarito Airport (IATA: PTM, ICAO: SVPT) is an airport serving Palmarito (Apure), a town in Apure state, Venezuela. The runway is 5 kilometres (3.1 mi) south of town.

== See also ==
- Transport in Venezuela
- List of airports in Venezuela
