= Puerto Páez Airport =

- IATA: PPZ; ICAO: none

Summary
- Airport type: Public
- Serves: Puerto Páez
- Elevation AMSL: 177 ft / 54 m
- Coordinates: 6°13′10″N 67°26′59″W

Map
- Location of the airport in Venezuela

Runways
Direction	Length		Surface
Direction	m	ft	Surface
04L/22R	1,605	5,266	Grass
04R/22L	2,300	7,546	Dirt
- Sources: GCM

Puerto Páez Airport (IATA: PPZ) is an airport serving the border town of Puerto Páez in the Apure state of Venezuela. It has two parallel runways: a grass runway with standard basic markings, and a longer dirt runway partially overgrown with brush.

== See also ==
- Transport in Venezuela
- List of airports in Venezuela
