= Kamarata Airport =

- IATA: KTV; ICAO: SVKM

Summary
- Airport type: Public
- Serves: Kamarata
- Elevation AMSL: 1,550 ft / 472 m
- Coordinates: 5°43′00″N 62°20′15″W

Map
- Location of the airport in Venezuela

Runways
Direction	Length		Surface
Direction	m	ft	Surface
06/24	720	2,362	Dirt
- Sources: GCM Google Maps

Kamarata Airport (IATA: KTV, ICAO: SVKM) is an airport serving the village of Kamarata in the Bolívar state of Venezuela.

The runway and village are at the base of an alluvial fan on the southeastern side of Auyán-tepui, the mesa that hosts Angel Falls. The falls are 35 kilometres (22 mi) northwest of Kamarata.

== See also ==
- Transport in Venezuela
- List of airports in Venezuela
