= Uonquén Airport =

Uonquén Airport Woken Airport
- IATA: none; ICAO: SVUQ

Summary
- Airport type: Public
- Serves: Uonquén
- Elevation AMSL: 2,820 ft / 860 m
- Coordinates: 4°59′00″N 61°43′45″W

Map
- Location of the airport in Venezuela

Runways
Direction	Length		Surface
Direction	m	ft	Surface
16/34	1,335	4,380	Grass
- Sources: GCM Google Maps

Uonquén Airport (ICAO: SVUQ) is an airport serving Uonquén, a village in the Bolívar state of Venezuela. The well-marked grass runway is adjacent to the village.

The village is near a tributary of the Caroni River, an eventual tributary of the Orinoco River.

== See also ==
- Transport in Venezuela
- List of airports in Venezuela
