= El Dorado Airport (Venezuela) =

- IATA: EOR; ICAO: SVED

Summary
- Airport type: Public
- Serves: El Dorado
- Elevation AMSL: 318 ft / 97 m
- Coordinates: 6°42′57″N 61°38′20″W

Map
- Location of the airport in Venezuela

Runways
Direction	Length		Surface
Direction	m	ft	Surface
10/28	1,188	3,898	Asphalt
- Sources: GCM Google Maps

El Dorado Airport (IATA: EOR, ICAO: SVED) is an airport serving the town of El Dorado in the Bolívar state of Venezuela.

The El Dorado non-directional beacon (Ident: ELO) is located on the field.

== See also ==
- Transport in Venezuela
- List of airports in Venezuela
