= Sub Teniente Nestor Arias Airport =

- IATA: SNF; ICAO: SVSP

Summary
- Airport type: Public
- Serves: San Felipe, Yaracuy, Venezuela
- Elevation AMSL: 761 ft / 232 m
- Coordinates: 10°16′45″N 68°45′20″W

Map
- Location of the airport in Venezuela

Runways
| Direction | Length | | Surface |
| Direction | m | ft | Surface |
|---|---|---|---|
| 05/23 | 1,490 | 4,888 | Asphalt |
- Sources: GCM Google Maps

Sub Teniente Nestor Arias Airport (IATA: SNF, ICAO: SVSP) is an international airport located in Cocorote Municipality, Yaracuy, and serving the city of San Felipe, Yaracuy, Venezuela. The runway is 5 kilometres (3.1 mi) south of the town.

The San Felipe non-directional beacon (Ident: SPE) is located near the northeastern end of the runway.

== See also ==
- Transport in Venezuela
- List of airports in Venezuela
