= Tumeremo Airport =

- IATA: TMO; ICAO: SVTM

Summary
- Airport type: Public
- Serves: Tumeremo
- Elevation AMSL: 581 ft / 177 m
- Coordinates: 7°15′00″N 61°31′35″W

Map
- Location of the airport in Venezuela

Runways
Direction	Length		Surface
Direction	m	ft	Surface
08/26	3,000	9,843	Asphalt
- Sources: GCM

Tumeremo Airport (IATA: TMO, ICAO: SVTM) is an airport serving Tumeremo, a town in the Bolívar state of Venezuela. The runway is 5 kilometres (3.1 mi) south of the town.

== See also ==
- Transport in Venezuela
- List of airports in Venezuela
