= Oro Negro Airport =

Oro Negro Airport Aeropuerto Oro Negro
- IATA: CBS; ICAO: SVON

Summary
- Airport type: Public
- Location: Cabimas, Venezuela
- Elevation AMSL: 164 ft (50 m)
- Coordinates: 10°19′50″N 71°19′20″W

Map
- Location of the airport in Venezuela

Runways
Direction	Length		Surface
Direction	m	ft	Surface
06/24	1,900	6,234	Asphalt
- Source: WAD GCM Google Maps

Oro Negro Airport (Spanish: Aeropuerto Oro Negro) (IATA: CBS, ICAO: SVON) is an airport serving Cabimas, a city in Zulia State in Venezuela. The runway is 14 kilometres (8.7 mi) southeast of the city.

== See also ==
- Transport in Venezuela
- List of airports in Venezuela
