= Jesús María Semprún Municipality =

Municipality in Zulia, Venezuela

Jesús María Semprún Municipality Municipio Jesús María Semprún
- Municipality
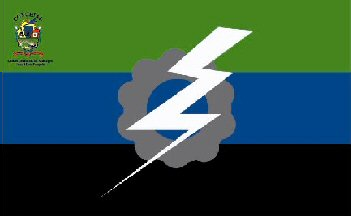
- Flag Seal

- Location in Zulia

- Location in Venezuela
- Country: Venezuela
- State: Zulia
- Founded: 1995
- Municipal seat: Casigua-El Cubo

Government
  - Mayor: Darío Díaz (PSUV)

Area
  - Total: 5,146.0 km^{2} (1,986.9 sq mi)

Population (2016)
  - Total: 39,648
  - Density: 7.7046/km^{2} (19.955/sq mi)
- Time zone: UTC−4 (VET)

Jesús María Semprún Municipality is located in Zulia, Venezuela. It was founded in 1995. The municipality has a total surface of 6003 km^{2} and it has some 39,648 inhabitant (2016 census). Its capital is Casigua-El Cubo.
