= Santa Bárbara de Barinas Airport =

- IATA: SBB; ICAO: SVSB

Summary
- Airport type: Public
- Serves: Santa Bárbara de Barinas
- Elevation AMSL: 590 ft / 180 m
- Coordinates: 7°48′10″N 71°09′50″W

Map
- Location of the airport in Venezuela

Runways
Direction	Length		Surface
Direction	m	ft	Surface
12/30	1,695	5,561	Asphalt
- Sources: GCM Google Maps

Santa Bárbara de Barinas Airport (IATA: SBB, ICAO: SVSB) is an airport serving Santa Bárbara de Barinas, a town in the Barinas state of Venezuela. The runway is adjacent to the south edge of town.

The Santa Barbara non-directional beacon (Ident: SBB) is located 0.25 nautical miles (460 m) north of mid-field. It may not be operating.

== See also ==
- Transport in Venezuela
- List of airports in Venezuela
