= Paramillo Airport =

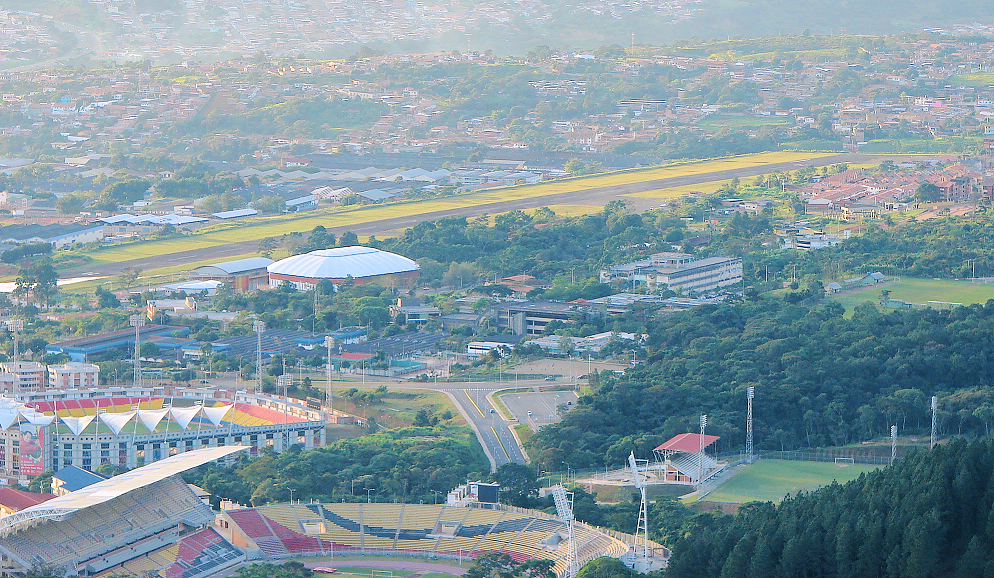
- IATA: SCI; ICAO: SVPM

Summary
- Airport type: Public
- Serves: San Cristóbal
- Elevation AMSL: 3,314 ft (1,010 m)
- Coordinates: 7°48′05″N 72°12′10″W

Map
- Location of the airport in Venezuela

Runways
Direction	Length		Surface
Direction	m	ft	Surface
02/20	1,085	3,560	Asphalt
- Sources: GCM Google Maps

Paramillo Airport (IATA: SCI, ICAO: SVPM) is an airport serving San Cristóbal, the capital of the Táchira state of Venezuela. The runway is in Paramillo, 4 kilometres (2.5 mi) north of San Cristóbal.

The Paramillo non-directional beacon (Ident: PRM) is located on the field.

== Accidents ==
- On October 22, 2025, a Piper PA-31T Cheyenne crashed shortly after takeoff from the airport. The two occupants died in the explosion.

== See also ==
- Transport in Venezuela
- List of airports in Venezuela
