= Guasipati Airport =

- IATA: none; ICAO: SVGT

Summary
- Airport type: Public
- Serves: Guasipati
- Elevation AMSL: 642 ft / 196 m
- Coordinates: 7°28′40″N 61°54′28″W

Map
- Location of the airport in Venezuela

Runways
Direction	Length		Surface
Direction	m	ft	Surface
05/23	1,630	5,348	Asphalt
- Sources: GCM Google Maps

Guasipati Airport (ICAO: SVGT) is an airport serving the town of Guasipati in the Bolívar state of Venezuela. The runway is on the west side of the town.

== See also ==
- Transport in Venezuela
- List of airports in Venezuela
