= Uriman Airport =

- IATA: URM; ICAO: SVUM

Summary
- Airport type: Public
- Serves: Uriman, Venezuela
- Elevation AMSL: 1,148 ft / 350 m
- Coordinates: 5°21′30″N 62°40′20″W

Map
- Location of airport in Venezuela

Runways
Direction	Length		Surface
Direction	m	ft	Surface
12/30	840	2,756	Gravel
- Source: GCM

Uriman Airport (IATA: URM, ICAO: SVUM) is an airport serving Uriman, a village in the Bolívar State of Venezuela. The village is on the Caroní River. The runway parallels the river and also serves as Uriman's main street. There is rising terrain south, and distant high terrain to the north of the airport.

== See also ==
- Transport in Venezuela
- List of airports in Venezuela
