= Carora Airport =

Minor airport in Venezuela

- IATA: VCR; ICAO: SVCO

Summary
- Airport type: Public
- Serves: Carora
- Elevation AMSL: 1,496 ft / 456 m
- Coordinates: 10°10′30″N 70°03′55″W

Map
- Location of the airport in Venezuela

Runways
Direction	Length		Surface
Direction	m	ft	Surface
11/29	1,520	4,987	Asphalt
- Sources: GCM Google Maps

Carora Airport (IATA: VCR, ICAO: SVCO) is an airport serving the city of Carora in the Lara state of Venezuela.

The Carora VOR-DME (Ident: COR) and non-directional beacon (Ident: COR) are located on the field.

== See also ==
- Transport in Venezuela
- List of airports in Venezuela
