= Qu Bo =

Qu Bo is the name of:

- Qu Bo (writer) (1923–2002), Chinese author
- Qu Bo (footballer) (born 1981), Chinese association footballer

== See also ==
- Qubo (disambiguation)
