= Divina Pastora Airport =

La Divina Pastora Airport
- IATA: none; ICAO: SVDP

Summary
- Airport type: Public
- Elevation AMSL: 2,578 ft / 786 m
- Coordinates: 4°41′20″N 61°03′35″W

Map
- Location of the airport in Venezuela

Runways
Direction	Length		Surface
Direction	m	ft	Surface
17/35	1,300	4,265	Gravel
- Sources: GCM Google Maps

La Divina Pastora Airport (ICAO: SVDP) is an airstrip 10 kilometres (6.2 mi) north-northeast of Santa Elena de Uairen in the Bolívar state of Venezuela. There is a power line 1,000 metres (3,300 ft) north of the runway.

The La Divina Pastora VOR-DME (Ident: LDP) is located 1.88 nautical miles (3.48 km) east of the runway. The La Divina Pastora non-directional beacon (Ident: LDP) is located 1.91 nautical miles (3.54 km) east-northeast of the runway.

== See also ==
- Transport in Venezuela
- List of airports in Venezuela
