= Perrera =

Venezuelan name for trucks generally used to move livestock or heavy objects

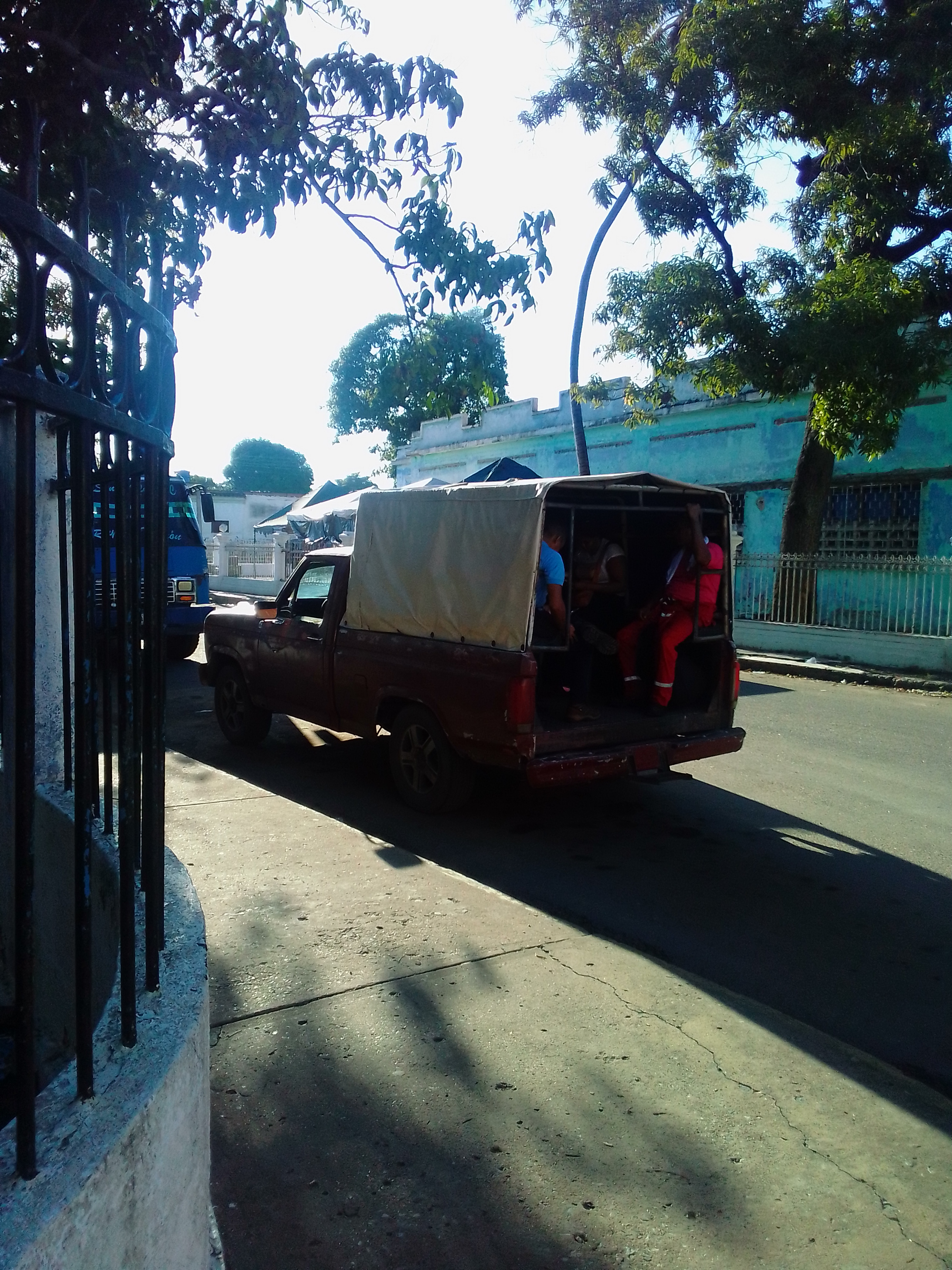
Perrera in Barcelona

The perreras (lit. 'dog kennels'), also known as chirrincheras, are the name given in Venezuela to trucks generally used to move livestock or heavy objects. Although historically people in rural and indigenous areas used to board them to move banana bags, during the crisis in Venezuela and in recent years their use has grown in cities such as Caracas, Maracaibo, Maracay, Valencia, Carúpano, Puerto La Cruz, Mérida, Puerto Ayacucho, among others, due to hyperinflation, the disabling of public transportation units such as buses, shortage of spare parts for vehicles and lack of cash, among other factors. The name comes from the similarity of the vehicles with the vans used to pick up dogs from the street. They lack safety for the transportation of people, as they do not have seats or seat belts. As they are not suitable vehicles for transporting people, the use of perreras can cause serious injuries and death of users. In 2018 alone, at least 32 passengers died from falls or rollovers.

== Background ==
Perreras consist of private vehicles such as dump trucks, pickup trucks, debris trucks generally used to move livestock or heavy objects such as industrial parts, food or garbage that are not suitable for transporting people. They were originally nicknamed this way decades ago in rural and indigenous areas, where they were common transport in the countryside and people would board them to move banana bags. However, during the presidency of Nicolás Maduro, Venezuela began to experience a public transportation crisis never seen before in modern times, affected by the rising cost and shortage of spare parts, as well as the lack of public investment, which forced users to make long walks and to take the perreras to the cities to cover the lack of vehicles.

According to Gustavo Chourio, an urban planning expert at the University of Zulia, about 30 percent of Venezuelans used to own their own vehicle, the highest average in Latin America, a proportion that has dropped drastically by 2018 because few people had sufficient resources to buy spare parts such as tires or batteries. Repairing buses and other public transport vehicles had become increasingly difficult due to the scarcity of spare parts. By 2018, according to the Committee of Public Transport Users in Caracas, 95% of cars, buses and cabs were disabled, while the number of perreras, operated by anyone with the means to drive a vehicle, had increased by 25%. Luis Alberto Salazar, president of the committee and its main spokesman, has stated that there are at least 150,000 perreras in Venezuela. Oscar Gutiérrez, driver and union leader in the state of Miranda, has stated that by the same year only 10% of the 12,000 buses that existed in the state were left, and according to the Intergremial Transportation Command, at least 90% of the 300,000 units covering the various routes in the country were in technical shutdown due to the lack of spare parts.

== History ==
Far from banning them because of their unsafe conditions, the Venezuelan government has presented the vehicles as an innovation in transportation and has justified their emergence, several pro-government governors and mayors have activated their own free fleet of perreras. Nicolás Maduro tried to solve the problem in 2015 with the purchase of 15,000 Yutong buses built in China. Most of said units, however, ended up broken down in official garages because there were no spare parts. In 2018, in Maracaibo, the Armed Forces decided to place military trucks along the main routes to help passengers move freely, but the initiative did not last long after a series of complaints that the trucks were too tall for passengers to board.

In April, during Expo Potencia 2018, an event in Caracas promoted by Nicolás Maduro to show the "production capacity" of companies linked to the government, the National Road Maintenance Company, attached to the Ministry of Transportation and which sells supplies for such as tires and oils, exhibited a model of a perrera built from a cargo truck that had no seats but walls made of brass and metal bars that supported the roof of the truck and from which users had to hold on. Erika Farías, mayor of the Libertador municipality, where the historic center of Caracas is concentrated, said that "these contingency trucks were placed at the disposal of our people so that during rush hours they can help to lighten the waiting time".

== Risks ==
As they are not suitable vehicles for the transportation of people, the use of perreras can cause serious injuries and death of the users. According to Luis Alberto Salazar, president of the Committee of Public Transportation Users, for the first half of 2018 there were 25 deaths of passengers due to the use of perreras: sixteen in Mérida, two in Valencia, four in Tocuyito (Carabobo), two in Güiria (Sucre) and one in Puerto Ayacucho. Besides the deaths, there are no means to take care of the injured and there is no one to take responsibility for the lives of the people. The transportation committee later updated the figure to at least 32 deaths and more than 100 seriously injured. A parliamentary commission of the National Assembly denounced that in the second quarter of the year, between April and July 2018, there were 55 deaths and 275 injuries due to the use of improvised means of transportation, such as perreras. Likewise, the Road Safety Observatory in its "VI Report on the Road Safety Situation in Venezuela" analyzes traffic accidents related to the transport of people in perreras and the laws that are being violated.

== See also ==
- Transport in Venezuela
- Crisis in Venezuela
