= Caicara del Orinoco Airport =

Airport in Bolívar, Venezuela

Caicara de Orinoco Airport Aeropuerto de Caicara del Orinoco
- IATA: CXA; ICAO: SVCD

Summary
- Airport type: Public
- Serves: Caicara del Orinoco
- Elevation AMSL: 140 ft / 43 m
- Coordinates: 7°37′33″N 66°09′55″W

Map
- Location of the airport in Venezuela

Runways
Direction	Length		Surface
Direction	m	ft	Surface
11/29	1,495	4,905	Asphalt
- Sources: GCM

Caicara del Orinoco Airport (IATA: CXA, ICAO: SVCD) is an airport serving the city of Caicara del Orinoco in the Bolívar state of Venezuela. Western approaches and departures cross the Orinoco River.

== See also ==
- Transport in Venezuela
- List of airports in Venezuela
