= Aeropostal Alas de Venezuela Flight 109 =

1991 aviation accident in Venezuela

Coordinates: 10°33′30″N 71°43′40″W

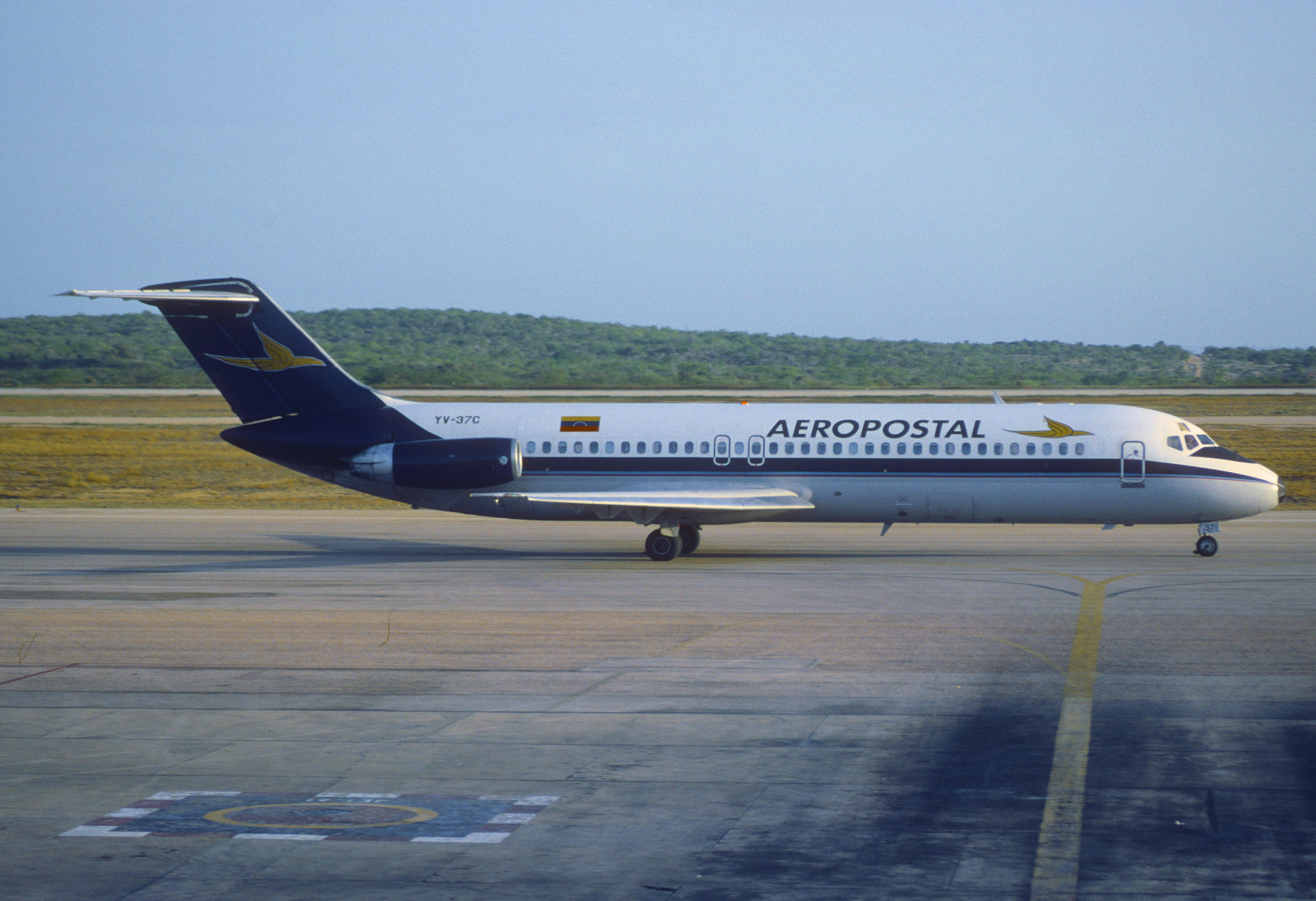
- An Aeropostal McDonnell Douglas DC-9-32 similar to the one involved.

Accident
- Date: March 5, 1991
- Summary: Controlled flight into terrain due to pilot error
- Site: Near La Valesa, Venezuela

Aircraft
- Aircraft type: McDonnell Douglas DC-9-32
- Operator: Aeropostal Alas de Venezuela
- IATA flight No.: CW109
- ICAO flight No.: ALV109
- Call sign: AEROPOSTAL 109
- Registration: YV-23C
- Flight origin: La Chinita International Airport, Maracaibo, Venezuela
- Destination: Santa Barbara Ed-L Delicias Airport, Venezuela
- Occupants: 45
- Passengers: 40
- Crew: 5
- Fatalities: 45
- Survivors: 0

Aeropostal Alas de Venezuela Flight 109 was a short-haul flight from La Chinita International Airport in Maracaibo, Venezuela to Santa Barbara Ed-L Delicias Airport that crashed on March 5, 1991.

== Aircraft ==
The aircraft used on Flight 109 was a McDonnell Douglas DC-9, which has been in service with Aeropostal for 14 years; the aircraft had been manufactured in 1976.

== The "Guillotine of Los Andes" ==
The Páramo "Los Torres" is known among Venezuelan pilots as The Guillotine ("Russian roulette") of the Andes. In a literal sense, it is a steep, usually foggy mountain that pilots had trouble avoiding before proper ground proximity warning systems were installed in planes. Prior to Flight 109, two other commercial aircraft had crashed near "The Guillotine". On December 15, 1950, an Avensa Douglas DC-3 flying from Mérida to Caracas crashed, killing all 28 passengers and 3 crew. Ten years later, on December 15, 1960, a Ransa flight crashed, killing all of its passengers.

== Accident ==
Flight 109 took off from La Chinita International Airport with 45 passengers and crew. Several minutes later, the McDonnell Douglas DC-9-32 crashed on the side of a foggy mountain near "The Guillotine" near La Valesa in the La Aguada sector of the Páramo Los Torres and burst into flames. All 45 people on board died.

== Cause ==
An investigation into the accident found that the cause of the crash was pilot error. The pilots inadvertently entered the wrong radial into their navigation system and went off course. Because of fog in the area, the pilots did not know they were on a collision course with the mountain.

== See also ==
- Santa Bárbara Airlines Flight 518 - On February 21, 2008, an ATR 42, crashed into the "Los Conejos" moor, several minutes after taking off from Alberto Carnevalli Airport in Mérida. All 43 passengers and three crew members were killed in the accident. The remains of the aircraft were found the following day in a mountain range approximately 10 kilometers northeast of Mérida at an altitude of 12,000 feet (3,700 m). After the accident, the company started a new public relations program and rebranded SBA Airlines. Like Flight 109, Santa Bárbara Airlines Flight 518 did not have accurate information of the route it was flying.
