= Parai-tepuí Airport =

- IATA: PPH; ICAO: SVPX

Summary
- Airport type: Public
- Serves: Parai-tepuí
- Location: Bolívar, Guayana, Venezuela, South America
- Elevation AMSL: 2,956 ft / 901 m
- Coordinates: 4°34′13″N 61°31′10″W

Map
- Location of the airport in Venezuela

Runways
Direction	Length		Surface
Direction	m	ft	Surface
10/28	930	3,051	Grass
- Sources: GCM Google Maps

Parai-tepuí Airport (IATA: PPH, ICAO: SVPX) is an airstrip serving the village of Parai-tepuí in the Bolívar state of Venezuela.

The "SVPX" ICAO code may not be active.

== See also ==
- Transport in Venezuela
- List of airports in Venezuela
