= General Bartolomé Salom Airport =

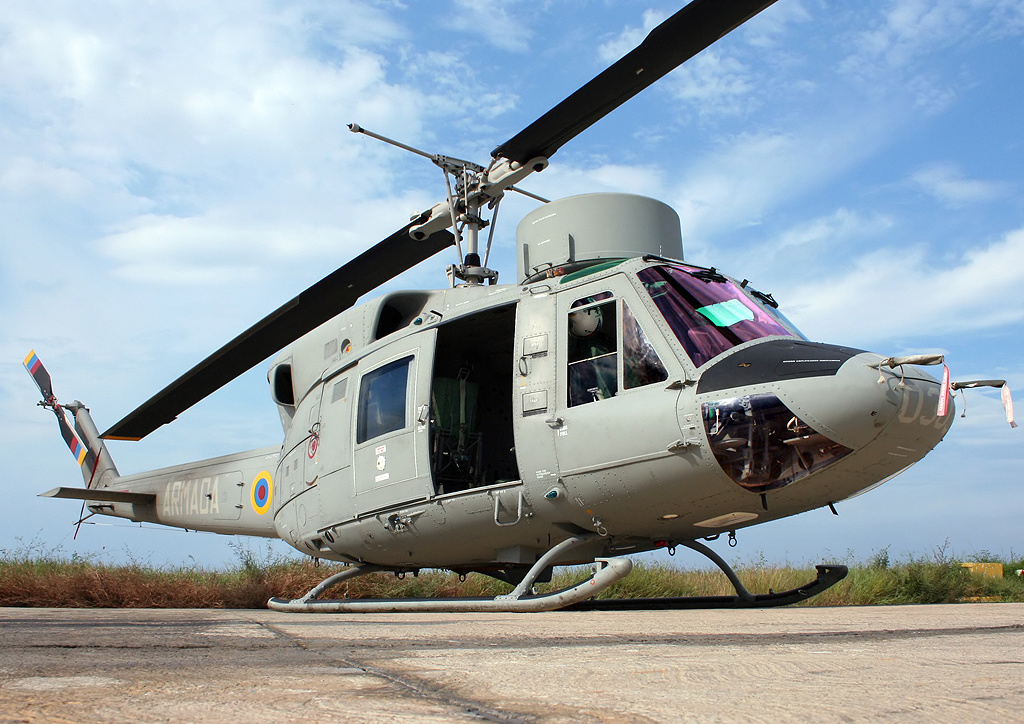
- IATA: PBL; ICAO: SVPC

Summary
- Airport type: Public
- Serves: Puerto Cabello
- Elevation AMSL: 32 ft / 10 m
- Coordinates: 10°28′45″N 68°04′20″W

Map
- Location of the airport in Venezuela

Runways
Direction	Length		Surface
Direction	m	ft	Surface
11/29	2,125	6,972	Asphalt
- Sources: GCM

General Bartolomé Salom Airport (IATA: PBL, ICAO: SVPC) is an airport serving Puerto Cabello, a city in the Carabobo state of Venezuela. The airport is 6 kilometres (3.7 mi) west of the city.

== History ==
The airport was established in 1953 as an alternate airport to the Maiquetía International Airport, now Simón Bolívar International Airport (Venezuela), and began operating on December 12, 1967.

On March 20, 1992, the Ministry of Transportation and Communications handed over maintenance of the airport to the government of Carabobo state. In the 1990s, the airport had declined and only operated for private flights. Multiple investments were made in the 2010s to improve the airport, resulting in reopenings for commercial airline use in 2014 and 2017.

== See also ==
- Transport in Venezuela
- List of airports in Venezuela
