= Guanare Airport =

Guanare Airport Aeropuerto Nacional Virgen de Coromoto
- IATA: GUQ; ICAO: SVGU

Summary
- Airport type: Public
- Operator: Government
- Serves: Guanare, Venezuela
- Elevation AMSL: 606 ft / 185 m
- Coordinates: 9°01′40″N 69°45′15″W

Map
- Location of the airport in Venezuela

Runways
Direction	Length		Surface
Direction	m	ft	Surface
05/23	1,800	5,906	Asphalt
- Sources: WAD GCM Google Maps

Guanare Airport (IATA: GUQ, ICAO: SVGU) is an airport serving Guanare, the capital of the Portuguesa state in Venezuela.

Runway length includes a 350 metres (1,150 ft) displaced threshold on Runway 23.

The Guanare non-directional beacon (Ident: GRE) is located on the field.

== See also ==
- Transport in Venezuela
- List of airports in Venezuela
