= El Cubo Airport =

Casigua El Cubo Airport Aeropuerto de Casigua-El Cubo
- IATA: CUV; ICAO: SVCG

Summary
- Airport type: Public
- Serves: Casigua-El Cubo
- Elevation AMSL: 98 ft / 30 m
- Coordinates: 8°45′25″N 72°32′10″W

Map
- Location of the airport in Venezuela

Runways
| Direction | Length | | Surface |
| Direction | m | ft | Surface |
|---|---|---|---|
| 10/28 | 1,185 | 3,888 | Asphalt |
- Sources: GCM Google Maps

Casigua El Cubo Airport (IATA: CUV, ICAO: SVCG) is an airport serving the city of Casigua-El Cubo in the Zulia state of Venezuela.

== See also ==
- Transport in Venezuela
- List of airports in Venezuela
