= Valle de la Pascua Airport =

- IATA: VDP; ICAO: SVVP

Summary
- Airport type: Public
- Serves: Valle de la Pascua, Venezuela
- Elevation AMSL: 604 ft (184 m)
- Coordinates: 09°13′20″N 065°59′35″W

Map
- Location of airport in Venezuela

Runways
Direction	Length		Surface
Direction	m	ft	Surface
08/26	1,525	5,003	Asphalt
- Source: WAD GCM Google Maps

Valle de la Pascua Airport (IATA: VDP, ICAO: SVVP) is an airport serving Valle de la Pascua, a city in the state of Guárico in central Venezuela.

The Valle De La Pascua VOR-DME (Ident: VPA) is located on the field.

The airport has aviation fuel Jet A1 on site. Its single runway has no lights, therefore it only operates from sunrise to sunset.

== See also ==
- Transport in Venezuela
- List of airports in Venezuela
