= Qubo (disambiguation) =

Qubo is a former American television network.

Qubo may also refer to:

- Fiat Qubo, an Italian leisure activity vehicle
- Quadratic unconstrained binary optimization (QUBO), a combinatorial optimization problem
- Qubo, a brand owned by the Hero Group, is known for its smart home devices

== See also ==
- Qu Bo
- Cubo
