= Las Flecheras Airport =

Las Flecheras Airport San Fernando De Apure Airport
- IATA: SFD; ICAO: SVSR

Summary
- Airport type: Public
- Serves: San Fernando de Apure
- Elevation AMSL: 154 ft / 47 m
- Coordinates: 7°53′00″N 67°26′40″W

Map
- Location of the airport in Venezuela

Runways
Direction	Length		Surface
Direction	m	ft	Surface
12/30	1,955	6,414	Asphalt
- Sources: GCM

Las Flecheras Airport (Spanish: Aeropuerto Las Flecheras) (IATA: SFD, ICAO: SVSR) is an airport serving the city of San Fernando de Apure, the capital of the Apure state in Venezuela. The runway is just east of the city, along the Apure River.

== Airlines and destinations ==
Airlines	Destinations
Conviasa	Caracas

== See also ==
- Transport in Venezuela
- List of airports in Venezuela
