= AVCEN Jetpod =

Quiet STOL aircraft proposal

The AVCEN Jetpod was a design proposal for a very quiet aircraft that could take off and land in short distances (STOL), developed by Avcen Limited, a company incorporated on 18 October 1988 which became a subsidiary of the Hong Kong–based company, Profit Sky Group Ltd.

A number of applications were proposed, including as a military transport, an executive transport, and as a short to medium-range air taxi. Avcen Limited was the British-based headquarters while Avcen Limited Malaysia was based at Patimas Technology Centre, Technology Park, Bukit Jalil, Kuala Lumpur. According to Avcen's publicity materials, the Jetpod's maximum speed was designed to be 550 km/h (340 mph; 300 kn). It would need only 125 metres (137 yards) to take-off or land, allowing runways to be constructed close to the center of major cities, and would be sufficiently quiet to not be noticeable above city traffic.

At 12:30 p.m. on 16 August 2009, a just-completed prototype Jetpod crashed, killing the founder of Avcen, Michael Robert Dacre, who was the sole occupant. Dacre had attempted to take off three times and on the fourth successfully lifted off and climbed to 200 meters. then the aircraft became uncontrollable and crashed. According to Taiping deputy police chief Syed A. Wahab Syed A. Majid, the company had not obtained permission from the Royal Malaysian Air Force to conduct the flight tests.
