= La Chinita International Airport =

Airport serving Maracaibo, Venezuela

La Chinita International Airport Aeropuerto Internacional La Chinita
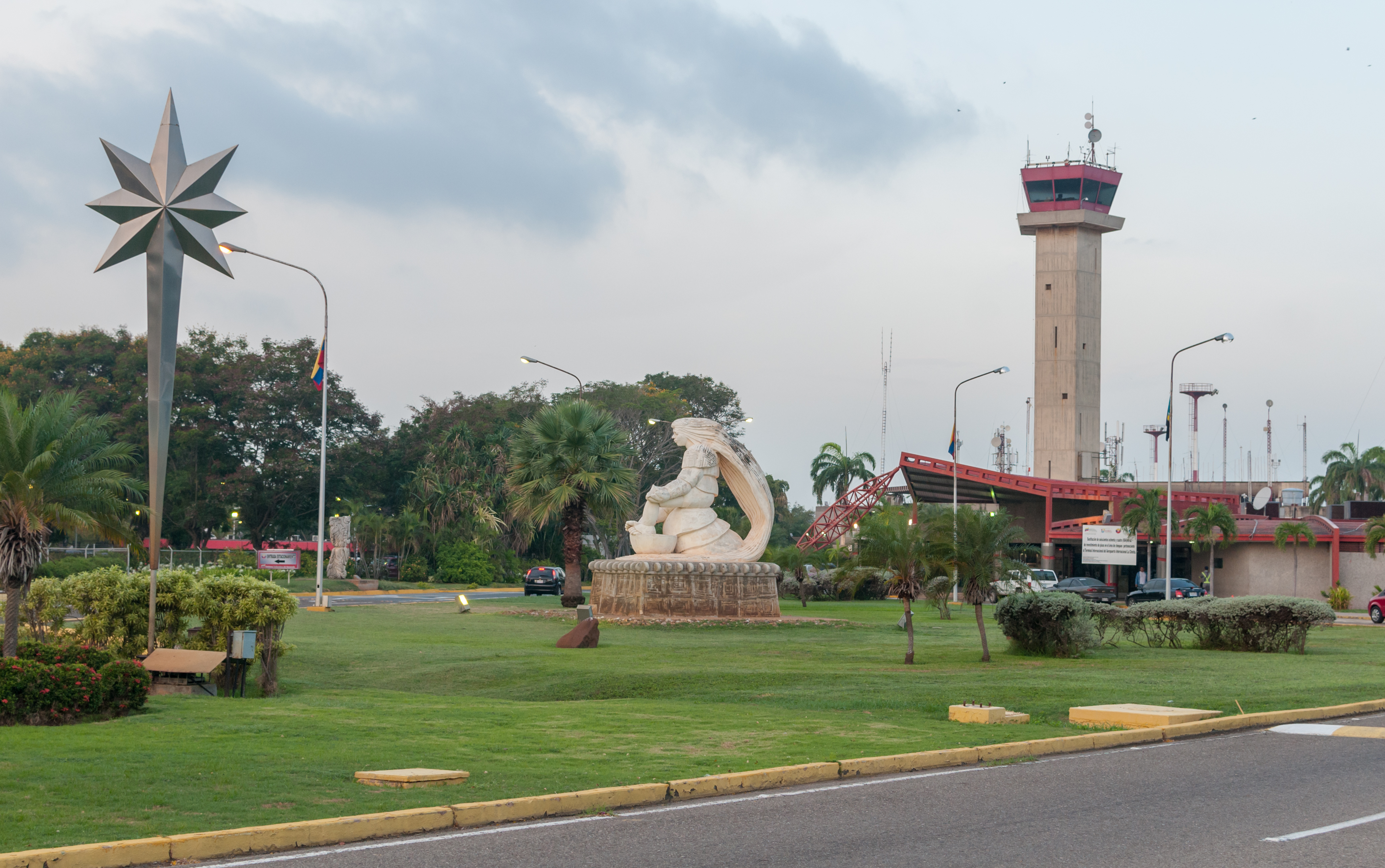
- IATA: MAR; ICAO: SVMC

Summary
- Airport type: Public / Military
- Operator: BAER (state owned by the Venezuelan government)
- Serves: Maracaibo
- Location: San Francisco, Zulia
- Opened: 16 November 1969; 56 years ago
- Hub for: Venezolana
- Focus city for: Conviasa
- Elevation AMSL: 235 ft (72 m)
- Coordinates: 10°33′30″N 71°43′40″W
- Website: https://baer.gob.ve/aeropuerto-internacional-la-chinita/

Map
- Location of the airport in Venezuela

Runways
Direction	Length		Surface
Direction	m	ft	Surface
03L/21R	3,000	9,843	Asphalt/Concrete
03R/21L	2,500	8,202	Asphalt/Concrete

Statistics (2008)
- Passenger movements: 2,848,677
- Sources:, WAD, Google Maps

La Chinita International Airport (IATA: MAR, ICAO: SVMC) is an international airport serving Maracaibo, the capital of Zulia State, Venezuela. It is located southwest of Maracaibo proper in the municipality of San Francisco. La Chinita is Venezuela's second most important airport in terms of passenger and aircraft movements, after Simón Bolívar International Airport near Caracas.

== History ==
This airport construction was accelerated due to the accident of Viasa Flight 742 on 16 March 1969, resulting in the death of 155 people and the closure of Grano de Oro Airport, which is located too close to the city centre and surrounded by neighborhoods.

== Physical Characteristics ==
Location: Located in the municipality of San Francisco, Zulia State, approximately 72 meters (235 feet) above sea level. Property Size: The entire airport complex spans a massive 1,335 hectares. Runways: Main Runway (03L/21R): 3000 meters long, 45 meters wide. It features a 450(kg/cm^2) threshold strength and is built with over 400 tons of asphalt concrete. Secondary Runway (03R/21L): 2500 meters long, 30 meters wide, often acting as a taxiway but utilized as a runway if the primary strip is closed.

== Facilities ==
Facilities at the airport include:

- Dining & Shopping: Cafes and snack bars, fast food chains, and duty-free shops.
- Financial Services: ATMs, bank branches, and currency exchange points.
- Comfort & Services: VIP lounges (WiFi), medical services, and mother/child rooms.
- Accessibilities: Ramps and specially equipped restrooms for passengers with limited mobility.
- Ground Transportation Taxi and shuttle services are available to take you to Maracaibo. Car rentals can be booked.

== Airlines and destinations ==
=== Passenger ===
Airlines	Destinations
American Eagle	Miami
Avianca	Bogotá
Avior Airlines	Willemstad
Venezolana	Panama City–Tocumen

=== Cargo ===
Airlines	Destinations
Aerosucre	Bogotá

== Accidents and incidents ==
- On 1 November 1971, Vickers Viscount YV-C-AMZ of Linea Aeropostal Venezolana crashed shortly after take-off. All four people on board were killed.
- On 5 March 1991, Aeropostal Alas de Venezuela Flight 108 crashed into a nearby mountain soon after takeoff, killing all 45 passengers and crew.

== See also ==
- Transport in Venezuela
- List of airports in Venezuela
