= Elorza =

- Location within Venezuela
- Coordinates: 07°03′35″N 69°29′48″W
- Time zone: UTC−4 (VET)

Elorza is a town in the Apure State in Venezuela. Elorza is on the region of the Venezuelan Llanos and it had 26.800 inhabitants as of 2012. It is the capital of the Rómulo Gallegos Municipality. The current mayor is Pedro Guerra.

This town had shared its urban area with the neighboring Colombia until the government of Eleazar López Contreras. Back then the Venezuelan part was called Elorza, honoring the Venezuelan hero Andrés Elorza, and the Colombian part was called El Viento (The Wind)

In August 2001, Venezuela completed a nationwide conversion of land-line phones to three-digit area codes and seven-digit local numbers. Elorza, Mantecal and Bruzual now have the area code 240.

== Geography ==
It is in the region of the Venezuelan Llanos in the Apure State, it is located at 07°03′35″N 69°29′48″W and is 55 kilometres (34 mi) east of the Colombian border. It is at the side of the Arauca River and in the middle of a plain used for agriculture at 95 meters over the sea level. Its Area Code is 240 and its postal code is 7011.

Roads to the town are two: One that connects it to Mantecal and Bruzual, the Troncal 19 Road; the other that connects it to La Trinidad de Orichuna and Guasdualito, the Via El Caribe Road. Elorza also has access to the Arauca river which allows fluvial transportation and an airport.

== Etymology ==
The antique Misión de San José de Arichuna, with time became known as El Viento, this town grew and spread along the Venezuelan-Colombian border. On March 10, 1866 the Legislative Assembly of the Apure State decided that the part of the population that was in the Venezuelan part would become known as Elorza, honoring Colonel José Andrés Elorza, who was a Venezuelan independence Hero. This decision was executed on the 12th of that same month.

The name of José Andrés Elorza was chosen since he had joined the army of Paez with the rank captain in La Trinidad de Orichuna, a nearby town to El Viento.

== Economy ==
In March 2018, Elorza began to issue its own currency, in response to the hyperinflation of the hard bolívar.

== See also ==
- List of cities and towns in Venezuela
