= La Orchila Island =

Island of the Federal Dependencies of Venezuela

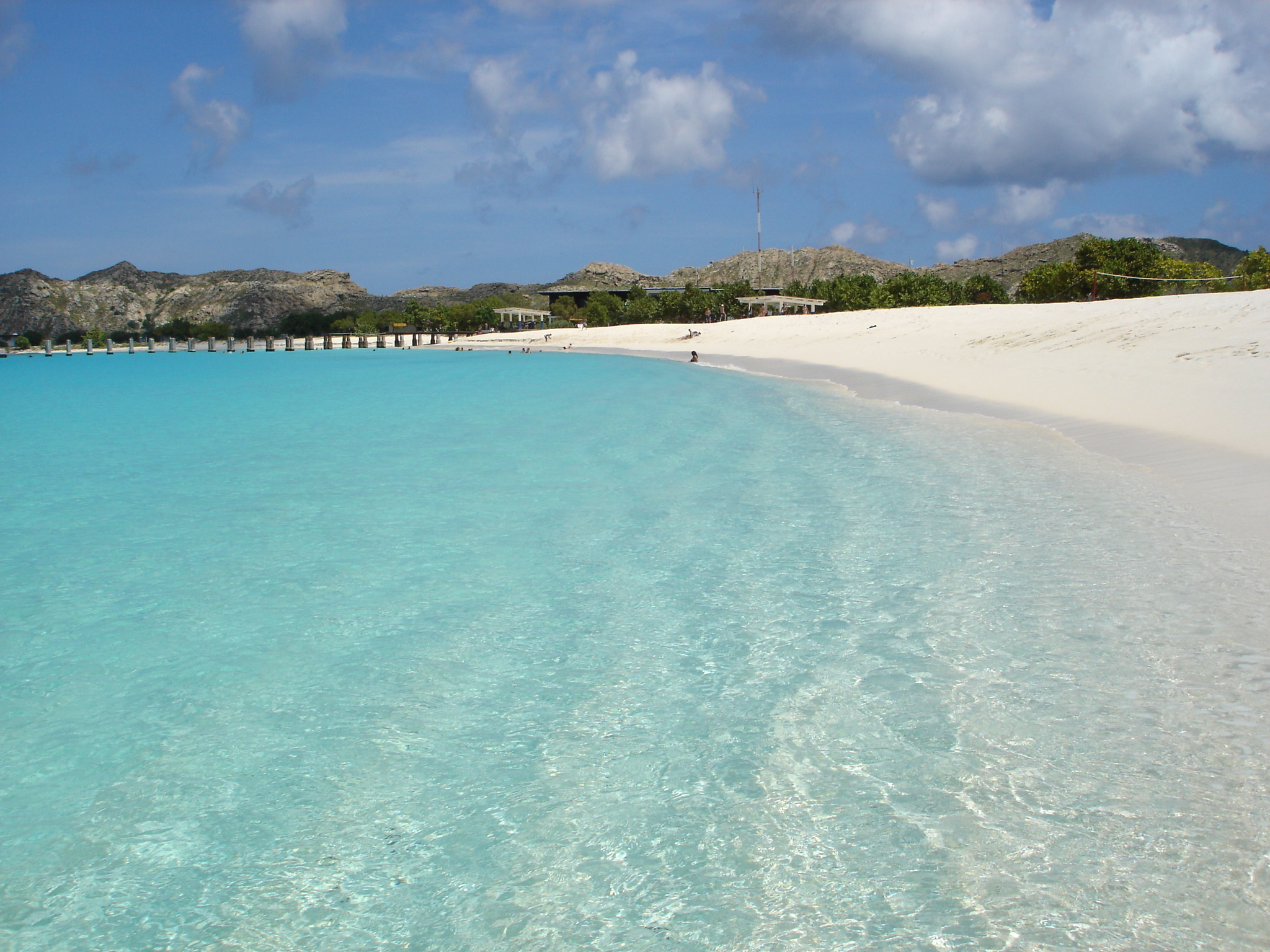
- Beach on La Orchila Island

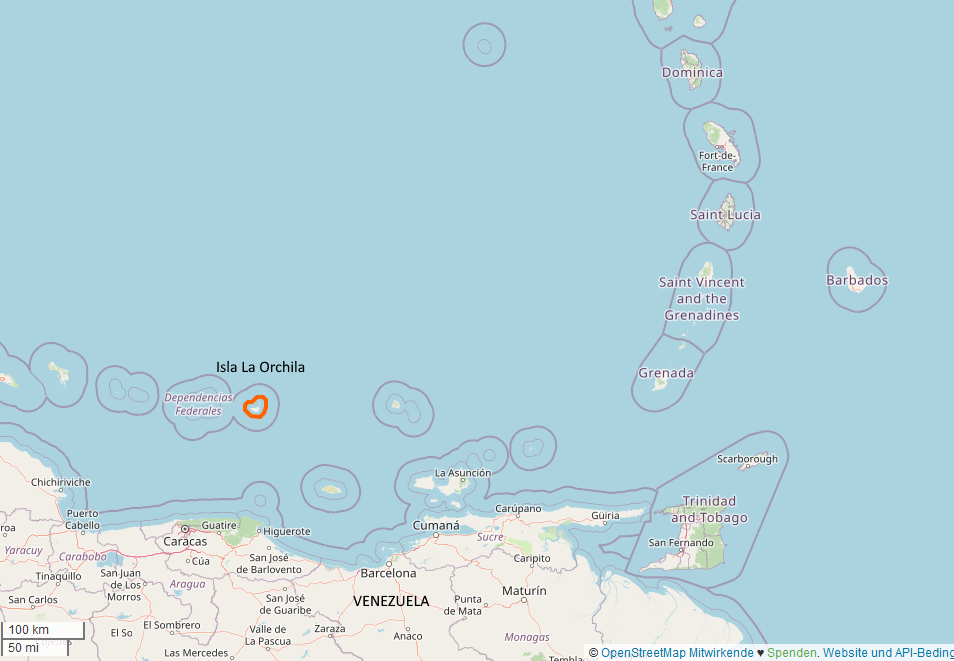
- Location in the Leeward Antilles

- Location in Venezuela

Geography
- Location: Caribbean Sea
- Coordinates: 11°48′N 66°10′W
- Archipelago: Leeward Antilles
- Area: 43 km^{2} (17 sq mi)
- Highest elevation: 139 m (456 ft)
- Highest point: Cerro Walker

Administration
- Venezuela
- Federal Dependencies of Venezuela
- Miranda Insular Territory

La Orchila Island is an island and a military base off the coast of Venezuela, north of Caracas. It has numerous beaches, including one where the sand is markedly pink (Arena Rosada).

There is a presidential retreat on this island, and the residential complex reserved for the military houses consists mainly of elevated houses made of wooden logs. There is also a court for bolas criollas. All the facilities are connected by pathways, mostly unpaved but smooth and clean.

== History ==
The Spanish explorer Alonzo de Santa Cruz described the island, calling it Orchilla, in the first half of the 16th century:

...to the east of this island [Tortuga] for eight leagues is another joy, Orchilla, eight leagues long and seven wide, with two islands to the south of it; this name was given because there is a lot of Orchilla, of which we speak long in the islands of Canaria General Islario...

In 1589 by order of the Spanish governor Diego de Osorio La Orchila and other islands like Los Roques were formally taken over by the Spanish Crown. At the end of the 16th century the islands were considered part of the Province of Venezuela.

The author M.D. Teenstra wrote in 1836 (in his book The Dutch West Indies):

The government of Curaçao also includes the uninhabited islets and rocks Little Curaçao, Aves, Roques and Orchilla." He goes on to say that "Orchilla, although we consider it to belong to Curaçao, is of too little importance to justify any dispute with Spain which claims this island as well. The Republic of Venezuela also considers it theirs and their coastal guard often chases away the fishermen from Curaçao who go there to collect shell fish, fire wood, grass and hay, turtles, and birds' eggs or burn lime.

Around the year 1870 the American company Philadelphia Guano Company was established in this group of islands, dedicated to the exploitation and exportation of guano, arriving to install a factory that would be abandoned over the years.

On August 22, 1871, it became part of the Colon Territory, an administrative division created under the government of General Antonio Guzmán Blanco, which was later dissolved.

In 1938, along with other islands, it became part of the Federal Dependencies created by law that same year. Until the 1950s it was populated by some 121 inhabitants, who were evicted during the government of General Marcos Pérez Jiménez (1952–58). Under his regime, some military installations and about thirty small houses were built, among them a presidential residence, designed by Julio Barreiro Rivas and which would be frequented by the governor and his close associates. Many of the successive Venezuelan presidents also used it as a summer residence, among them the former social democrat president Carlos Andrés Pérez (1974–79 and 1989–93).

In 1978 Venezuela and the Kingdom of the Netherlands established the marine limits between the Federal Dependencies and the Dutch Antilles in the Caribbean Sea. Venezuelan President Hugo Chávez was imprisoned on the island during the April 2002 coup.

On March 14, 2009, Russian Air Force Major General Anatolii Zhikharev, head of the Russian Air Force's Long-Range Aviation, reported that Venezuela has offered Russia the use of the Antonio Diaz Naval Air Station on the island to base its strategic bombers. Chavez however denied this, which Kremlin official Alexei Pavlov prompted to say that the military just spoke about 'technical possibilities'.

In October 2011 the Orchila and its adjacent islands are integrated to the Francisco de Miranda Island Territory, a subdivision of the Federal Dependencies with capital in the Los Roques Archipelago.

In 2018, the Russian military released a plan to deploy supersonic Tupolev Tu-160 strategic bombers to the island. According to Colonel Eduard Rodyukov, a Corresponding Member of the Academy of Military Sciences, in turn, told Nezavisimaya Gazeta that "the arrival of Russia’s Tu-160 strategic bombers to Central America is kind of a signal to Trump to make him realize that abandoning nuclear disarmament treaties will have a boomerang effect."

== See also ==
- Federal Dependencies of Venezuela
- List of marine molluscs of Venezuela
- List of sponges of Venezuela
