= Kavanayén =

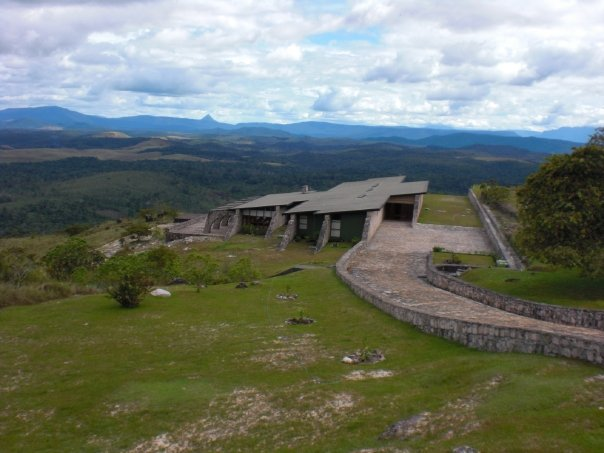

- Location within Venezuela
- Coordinates: 5°35′5″N 61°45′3″W
- Country: Venezuela
- State: Bolívar
- Municipality: Gran Sabana
- Established: August 5, 1943
- Elevation: 1,350 m (4,430 ft)
- Time zone: UTC−4 (VET)
- Climate: Cfb

Kavanayén, known officially as Santa Teresita de Kavanayén, is an indigenous village inhabited mainly by the Pemons. It is located in the Canaima National Park in the Gran Sabana Municipality of Bolívar, in the Upper Caroní River.
