= Casigua-El Cubo =

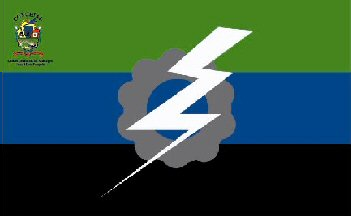
- Flag

- Location within Venezuela
- Coordinates: 08°44′42″N 072°31′11″W
- Country: Venezuela
- State: Zulia
- Counties: Jesús María Semprún
- Founded: 13 December 1913

Area
  - Total: 6,003 km^{2} (2,318 sq mi)
- Elevation: 3 m (9.8 ft)

Population (2011)
  - Total: 30,484
  - Density: 5.078/km^{2} (13.15/sq mi)
- Time zone: UTC−4 (VET)
- Postal code: 5063
- Area code: (+58) 275

Casigua-El Cubo is the seat of the Jesús María Semprún municipality, within the Zulia State in northwestern Venezuela. It is located in the south of the Lake Maracaibo, on the banks of the Tarra River.

== Transport ==
The city is served by the El Cubo Airport (IATA: CUV, ICAO: SVCG).
