= Transport in Venezuela =

Transport in Venezuela revolves around a system of highways and airports. Venezuela is connected to the world primarily via air (Venezuela's airports include the Simón Bolívar International Airport near Caracas and La Chinita International Airport near Maracaibo) and sea (with major seaports at La Guaira, Maracaibo and Puerto Cabello). In the south and east the Amazon rainforest region has limited cross-border transport; in the west, there is a mountainous border of over 1,375 miles (2,213 km) shared with Colombia. The Orinoco River is navigable by oceangoing vessels up to 400 km inland, and connects the major industrial city of Ciudad Guayana to the Atlantic Ocean.

Venezuela has a limited national railway system, which has no active rail connections to other countries. Several major cities have metro systems; the Caracas Metro has been operating since 1983. The Maracaibo Metro and Valencia Metro were opened more recently. Venezuela has a road network of around 100,000 km (placing it around 47th in the world); around a third of roads are paved.

As of 2019, about 80% of public transportation is not operational within the country.

== Railways ==
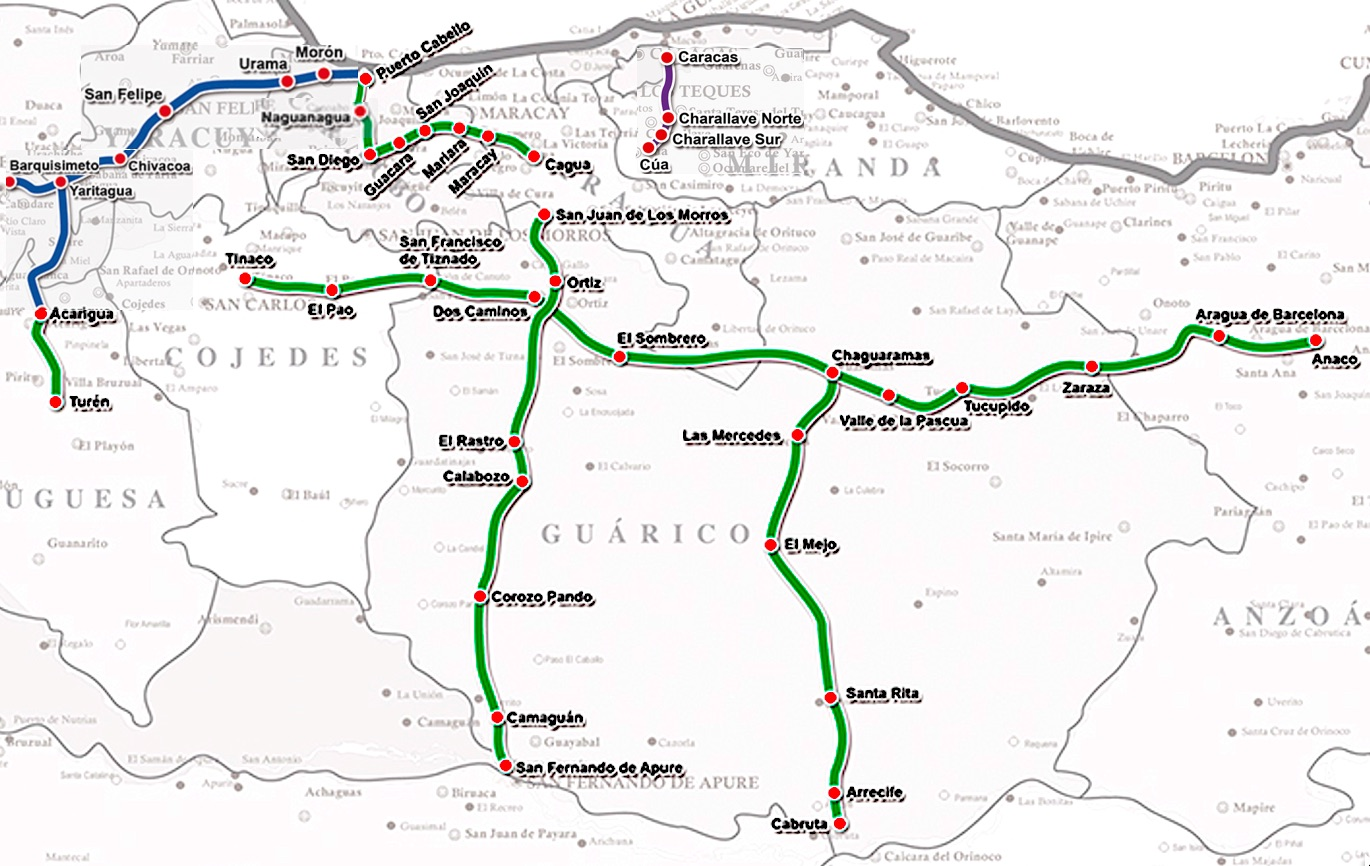
Map based on IFE maps of lines operating (purple), lines being restored (blue) and lines under construction (green) as at 2017

total: 7000 km (?) (248 km privately owned, including Orinoco Mining Company)
standard gauge: 682 km (40 km electrified) 1,435 mm (4 ft 8 1/2 in)

=== Cities with underground railway systems ===
- Caracas (El Metro de Caracas, operated by C.A. Metro de Caracas)
- Los Teques Metro - opened in 2006.
- Maracaibo Metro - opened in 2006.
- Valencia Metro (Venezuela) - opened in 2006.

=== See also ===
- East-West Railway, Venezuela

=== Railway links with adjoining countries ===
- Guyana - no
- Brazil - no
  - Brazil
- Colombia - yes, but inoperative (Railroad of Cúcuta) - proposed rebuilding
  - Colombia

=== Maps ===
- Encarta

=== Standards ===
- Gauge: 1,435 mm (4 ft 8 1/2 in)
- Coupling: AAR
- Brakes: Air
- Electrification: 25 kV AC 60 Hz

=== Timeline ===
==== 2006 ====
- Venezuela awards contracts worth $2.2 billion to build two new railway lines. Construction on the two new lines connecting San Juan de los Morros to San Fernando de Apure and connecting Chaguaramas to Cabruta is expected to begin in Q2 2006 and is expected to take six years to complete. April 2006 in rail transport.
- In October 2006, Venezuela opened a new Caracas-Cúa railway, the first new railway in the country for 70 years
- "Towards the end of this month, we would have final discussions with Mittal Steel," said Mr Kapur, adding that the initial discussions took place in March. Moreover, Ircon is also likely to construct a new rail line in Venezuela at an estimated cost of $350 million.

==== 2008 ====
- On August 23, 2008, a deal was signed between Argentina (Argentina), Brazil (Brazil) and Venezuela to develop an electrified railway link between these countries. A minor hurdle is the use of utility frequencies of both 50 Hz and 60 Hz.
- July 5 - meeting between Venezuela, Colombia (Colombia) and Ecuador (Ecuador) regarding a railway for freight and passengers to link the three countries, and linking the Pacific with the Atlantic also.

==== 2009 ====
- March 2009 - China to help build new network

== Highways ==
Automobile transport is encouraged by the fact that Venezuela has the lowest petrol prices in the world, at $0.18 per gallon ($0.05 per liter). In some cases, petrol is less expensive than bottled water.

total: 96,155 km
paved: 32,308 km
unpaved: 63,847 km (1997 est.)

=== Motorways ===
Venezuela has a fairly developed motorway network, certainly more developed than in most of South American nations. It is especially operative in the Northern and Western parts of the country, connecting the main cities of the country. The following roads feature at least 4 lanes and double carriageway:

- Autopista Barquisimeto - Acarigua. It runs from Barquisimeto through Cabudare to Acarigua. Its length is 70 km.
- Autopista Caracas - La Guaira. It runs from Caracas to the Maiquetía International Airport and La Guaira. It extends for 30 km.
- Autopista Cimarrón Andresote. It runs from Barquisimeto through San Felipe and Morón. Its length is 125 km.
- Autopista Circunvalación del Este. It runs from Valencia to Naguanagua. Its length is 13 km.
- Autopista Circunvalación Norte. It serves as a bypass for Barquisimeto. Its length is 30 km.
- Autopista Gran Mariscal de Ayacucho. Projected to run from Caracas to Güiria, it is a motorway currently under construction, though parts of it are already in use, including Caracas - Río Chico (98 km.), Caucagua - Higuerote (20 km.), Boca de Uchire - Clarines (43 km.), Píritu - Puerto La Cruz (66 km.) and Santa Fe - Cumaná (52 km).
- Autopista José Antonio Páez. It runs from Valencia to Barinas. It also connects the cities of San Carlos, Acarigua and Guanare. It has a length of 336 km.
- Autopista Manuel Piar. It connects Ciudad Guayana and Upata. It stretches for 62 km.
- Autopista Regional del Centro. It is one of the most important motorways of the country, running between Venezuela's first and third biggest population centres: Caracas and Valencia. It also connects Charallave, Maracay and Guacara. Its length is 160 km.
- Autopista San Cristóbal - La Fría. It is a motorway currently under construction, projected to link San Cristóbal and La Fría. Some parts of the motorway are already open, such as San Cristóbal - Palmira (18 km), Lobatera - San Juan de Colón (16 km) and San Félix - La Fría (19 km).
- Autopista Simón Bolívar. It links Ciudad Guayana and Puerto Ordaz with Ciudad Bolívar. It has a length of 131 km.
- Autopista Valencia - Puerto Cabello. It extends from Guacara, to Puerto Cabello in the Caribbean coast. It has a length of 60 km.
- Autopista Valera - Trujillo. It connects the city of Valera with Trujillo. It extends for 34 km.
- Autopista Zulia - Lara. It extends from Barquisimeto to Maracaibo, two of the main population centres of Venezuela. It also links Carora, Ciudad Ojeda and Cabimas. It has a length of 293 km.
- Avenida Juan Bautista Arismendi. It connects Porlamar and Punta de Piedras. It has a length of 36 km.
- Carretera Rafael Caldera. It is a two lane expressway that links Mérida with El Vigía. It has a length of 60 km.
- Intercomunal Coro - Punto Fijo. It connects Coro and Punto Fijo. It extends for 79 km.

== Waterways ==
7,100 km; Rio Orinoco (400 km) and Lago de Maracaibo accept oceangoing vessels

== Pipelines ==
- extra heavy crude 980 km
- crude oil 6,694 km
- refined products 1,620 km
- natural gas 5,347 km (2010)

== Ports and harbors ==
- Amuay
- Bajo Grande
- El Tablazo
- La Guaira
- La Salina
- Maracaibo
- Matanzas
- Palua
- Puerto Cabello
- Puerto la Cruz
- Puerto Miranda
- Puerto Ordaz
- Puerto Sucre
- Punta Cardon

== Air travel ==
In 2012, Venezuela had 492 airports.

In 2014, due to difficulty converting bolivars to other currencies, many international airline either cut back or entirely cancelled service to the country. A shortage of seats caused international ticket prices to rise; one report found airfare to Miami more than double the fare to Miami from Bogota in Colombia.

=== Airports - with paved runways ===
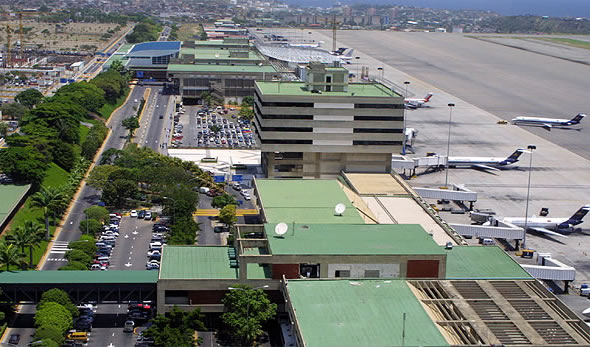
Simón Bolívar International Airport

total: 128
over3,047 m: 6
2,438 to 3,047 m: 9
1,524 to 2,437 m: 35
914 to 1,523 m: 61
under 914 m: 17 (2012)

=== Airports - with unpaved runways ===
total: 364
2,438 to 3,047 m: 3
1,524 to 2,437 m: 55
914 to 1,523 m: 113
under 914 m: 193 (2012)

=== Heliports ===
3 (2012)

== Cable car ==
Venezuela has had in times the world's highest cable car in operation. The Mérida cable car opened in 1960, connecting Mérida with the top of the Sierra Nevada de Mérida. It was closed indefinitely in 2008, having reached the end of its service life. After an extensive renovation and the renewal of its fleet, operations resumed in 2016.

== See also ==
- Perrera
