= Conviasa =

Flag carrier of Venezuela

Línea Aérea Conviasa S.A.

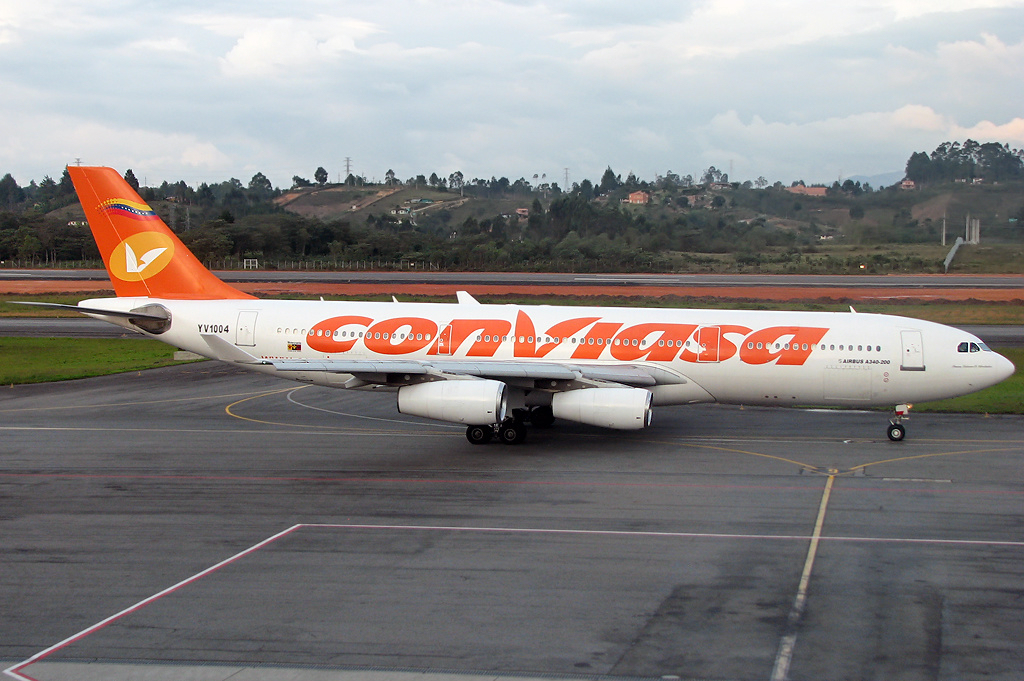
IATA	ICAO	Call sign
V0	VCV	CONVIASA
- Founded: March 31, 2004; 22 years ago
- Commenced operations: November 28, 2004; 21 years ago
- Hubs: Simón Bolívar International Airport
- Secondary hubs: Santiago Mariño Caribbean International Airport
- Focus cities: Augusto C. Sandino International Airport; La Chinita International Airport
- Frequent-flyer program: Infinito
- Subsidiaries: Emtrasur Cargo
- Fleet size: 30
- Destinations: 21
- Parent company: Ministry of Aquatic and Air Transport
- Headquarters: Maiquetía, Venezuela
- Key people: Ramón Araguayan (CEO)
- Founder: Hugo Chávez
- Employees: 2,200 (2023)
- Website: www.conviasa.aero

Línea Aérea Conviasa (legally Consorcio Venezolano de Industrias Aeronáuticas y Servicios Aéreos) is the flag carrier of Venezuela, with its headquarters on the grounds of Simón Bolívar International Airport in Maiquetía, near Caracas. It is the flag carrier and largest airline of Venezuela, operating services to domestic destinations and destinations in the Caribbean and South America. Conviasa is known to establish routes for political reasons rather than for profit.

== History ==
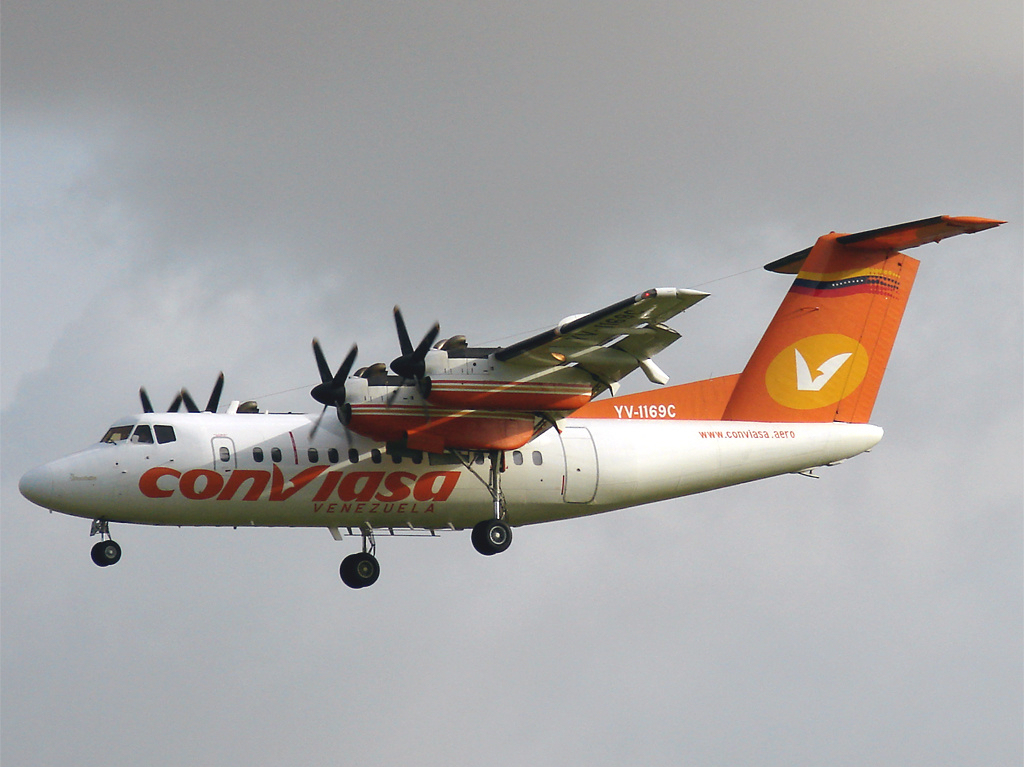
Former Conviasa de Havilland Canada Dash 7, 2006

In January 1997, Venezuela's former flag carrier, Viasa, ceased operations after 37 years of service due to prolonged financial problems. In May 2001, the idea to create a new flag carrier for Venezuela was proposed, but in December 2002, the project was put on hold until October 1, 2003. On March 31, 2004, then President of Venezuela, Hugo Chávez, signed a decree that formally established the airline. This decree was published in the nation's official gazette the next day.

On November 28, 2004, Conviasa's inaugural flight was made with a De Havilland Canada Dash 7 flying from the airport in Charallave to the Santiago Mariño International Airport, on Margarita Island. On December 10, 2004, Conviasa formally began its national and international operations. Conviasa was originally run by the now-defunct Ministry of Production and Commerce, but it has since been taken over by the Ministry of Infrastructure.

In March 2007, Iran Air began a route from Caracas to Tehran via Damascus under a codeshare agreement with Conviasa. Conviasa took it over seven months later. The flight was usually less than half-full and primarily carried Syrian Venezuelans, Iranian businesspeople and Venezuelan officials. One of the company's executives stated that the service mainly existed for political reasons; Venezuela had warm relations with Iran and Syria. Some people raised concerns about the route. In 2008, the Italian newspaper La Stampa said Iran was using the flight to transport missile parts to Syria, enabling it to evade United Nations sanctions. President Chávez described the report as American propaganda. Additionally, the United States, which deemed Iran and Syria state sponsors of terrorism, suspected the immigration and customs checks that passengers underwent were lax. The Venezuelan government responded that Conviasa was running an ordinary commercial flight and that travelers were subject to standard controls. As of 2010, it was uncertain whether the carrier still flew to Tehran.

Following the crash of Flight 2350 on September 17, 2010, the government of Venezuela grounded all Conviasa flights so that it could perform a technical review of the airline's fleet. The airline said that the temporary suspension would remain in effect until October 1, 2010. Flights were then reinstated.

On April 3, 2012, Conviasa was banned from flying to countries in the European Union because of safety concerns. It said that Conviasa failed to show it had taken adequate steps to prevent future accidents. In August 2012, the carrier ended its nonstop service to Damascus. The European Union lifted its restriction on Conviasa on July 10, 2013.

In September 2012, Conviasa took delivery of its first Embraer 190. Twenty aircraft were ordered, but only received 15, and one Embraer Lineage 1000.

Conviasa is under the authority of the Ministry of Aquatic and Air Transport. The airline is owned by the Venezuelan government (80%) and the regional government of Nueva Esparta (20%). Conviasa has its headquarters on the grounds of Simón Bolívar International Airport in Maiquetía, Venezuela, near Caracas. Originally Conviasa had its headquarters on Margarita Island. At one time, Conviasa had its headquarters in the East Tower of Parque Central in Caracas.

In August 2016, it was reported that over 80 percent of Conviasa pilots quit their jobs due to low and outstanding payments. The airline subsequently had to reduce operations to around 16 flights per day. Additionally, several of the company's aircraft have been stored unused for several months.

On May 5, 2017, Conviasa was forced to suspend all international operations due to a lack of foreign currency to pay for international aircraft insurance. Also in May 2017, Wamos Air terminated its contract with Conviasa on short notice. Wamos Air operated a single Boeing 747-400 for Conviasa between Caracas and Madrid. In autumn 2019, Conviasa started again many early terminated international routes back for its network.

On February 7, 2020, the United States Office of Foreign Assets Control ("OFAC") added Conviasa and its fleet of 40 aircraft to the Specially Designated Nationals list. In practice, this makes it extremely unlikely that Conviasa could source replacement parts for its fleet of airworthy and grounded B737 aircraft. Additionally, U.S. nationals are prohibited from flying on Conviasa's domestic and international flights. Finally, to the extent that other countries abide by OFAC policy, those countries (Brazil, France, UK) will refuse to sell Conviasa replacement parts for Embraer and Airbus aircraft, prohibit its nationals from flying Conviasa, and will cancel Conviasa-serviced routes to their respective countries (Panama, Mexico, Bolivia, and Ecuador).

In July 2020, Conviasa bought a 23-year old Airbus A340-300 to supplement its single A340-200, as well as to reinforce air cargo and long radius. In March and June 2022, Conviasa received two 20-year old Airbus A340-600s as part of the company's fleet expansion, also announcing that it will receive an A340-500 in the following months. This means Conviasa will be the only commercial operator that operates all models of the Airbus A340.

== Destinations ==
As of October 2026, Conviasa serves the following scheduled destinations:

Country	City	Airport	Notes	Refs
Algeria	Algiers	Houari Boumediene Airport	Suspended	
Argentina	Buenos Aires	Ministro Pistarini International Airport	Suspended	
Aruba	Oranjestad	Queen Beatrix International Airport	Terminated	
Barbados	Bridgetown	Grantley Adams International Airport		
Bolivia	Santa Cruz de la Sierra	Viru Viru International Airport	Suspended	
Brazil	Manaus	Eduardo Gomes International Airport	Terminated	
Chile	Santiago	Arturo Merino Benítez International Airport	Suspended	
China	Guangzhou	Guangzhou Baiyun International Airport	Suspended	
Colombia	Bogotá	El Dorado International Airport	Terminated	
Cuba	Havana	José Martí International Airport	Terminated	
Cuba	Varadero	Juan Gualberto Gómez Airport	Terminated	
Dominica	Roseau	Douglas–Charles Airport	Terminated	
Dominican Republic	Santo Domingo	Las Americas International Airport	Terminated	
Ecuador	Guayaquil	José Joaquín de Olmedo International Airport	Terminated	
Ecuador	Quito	Mariscal Sucre International Airport	Suspended	
Grenada	St. George's	Maurice Bishop International Airport	Terminated	
Iran	Tehran	Tehran Imam Khomeini International Airport	Terminated	
Libya	Tripoli	Tripoli International Airport	Terminated	
Mexico	Cancún	Cancún International Airport	Terminated	
Mexico	Mexico City	Felipe Ángeles International Airport	Terminated	
Mexico	Toluca	Toluca International Airport	Terminated	
Nicaragua	Managua	Augusto C. Sandino International Airport	Focus city	
Panama	Panama City	Tocumen International Airport	Terminated	
Peru	Lima	Jorge Chávez International Airport	Terminated	
Qatar	Doha	Hamad International Airport	Terminated	
Russia	Moscow	Vnukovo International Airport	Terminated	
Russia	Saint Petersburg	Pulkovo Airport	Terminated	
Saint Vincent and the Grenadines	Kingstown	Argyle International Airport	Terminated	
Spain	Madrid	Madrid–Barajas Airport	Terminated	
Syria	Damascus	Damascus International Airport	Terminated	
Trinidad and Tobago	Port of Spain	Piarco International Airport	Terminated	
Venezuela	Acarigua	Oswaldo Guevara Mujica Airport	Terminated	
Venezuela	Barcelona	General José Antonio Anzoátegui International Airport		
Venezuela	Barinas	Barinas Airport		
Venezuela	Barquisimeto	Jacinto Lara International Airport		
Venezuela	Canaima	Canaima Airport		
Venezuela	Caracas	Simón Bolívar International Airport	Hub	
Venezuela	Carúpano	General José Francisco Bermúdez Airport	Terminated	
Venezuela	Ciudad Guayana	Manuel Carlos Piar Guayana Airport		
Venezuela	Coche Island	Andrés Miguel Salazar Marcano Airport	Terminated	
Venezuela	Coro	José Leonardo Chirino Airport	Terminated	
Venezuela	Cumaná	Antonio José de Sucre Airport		
Venezuela	El Vigía	Juan Pablo Pérez Alfonzo Airport		
Venezuela	Gran Roque	Los Roques Airport		
Venezuela	La Fría	La Fría Airport		
Venezuela	Las Piedras	Josefa Camejo International Airport		
Venezuela	Maracaibo	La Chinita International Airport	Focus city	
Venezuela	Maturín	José Tadeo Monagas International Airport		
Venezuela	Mérida	Alberto Carnevalli Airport	Terminated	
Venezuela	Porlamar	Santiago Mariño Caribbean International Airport	Hub	
Venezuela	Puerto Ayacucho	Cacique Aramare Airport		
Venezuela	San Antonio del Táchira	Juan Vicente Gómez International Airport		
Venezuela	San Fernando de Apure	Las Flecheras Airport	Terminated	
Venezuela	Santa Elena de Uairén	Santa Elena de Uairén Airport	Terminated	
Venezuela	Santo Domingo	Mayor Buenaventura Vivas Airport		
Venezuela	San Tomé	San Tomé Airport	Terminated	
Venezuela	Tucupita	San Rafael Airport	Terminated	
Venezuela	Valencia	Arturo Michelena International Airport		
Venezuela	Valera	Dr. Antonio Nicolás Briceño Airport		

=== Codeshare agreements ===
Conviasa has codeshare agreements with the following airlines:

- Iraqi Airways (planned)
- Syrian Air

== Fleet ==
=== Current ===
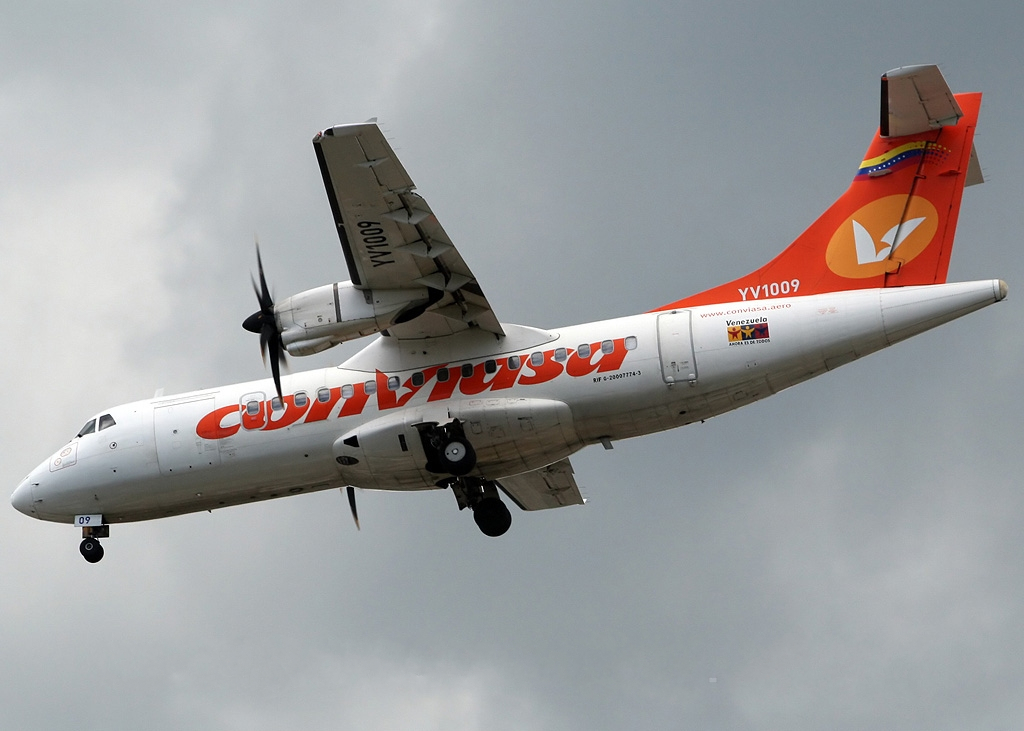
Conviasa ATR 42-400

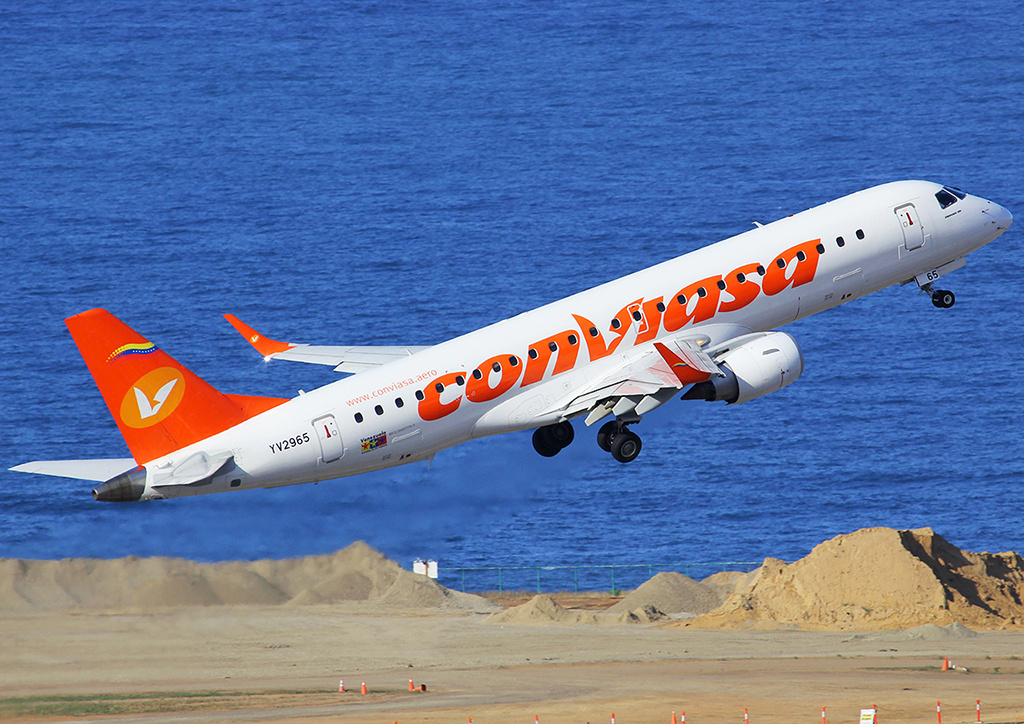
Conviasa Embraer 190

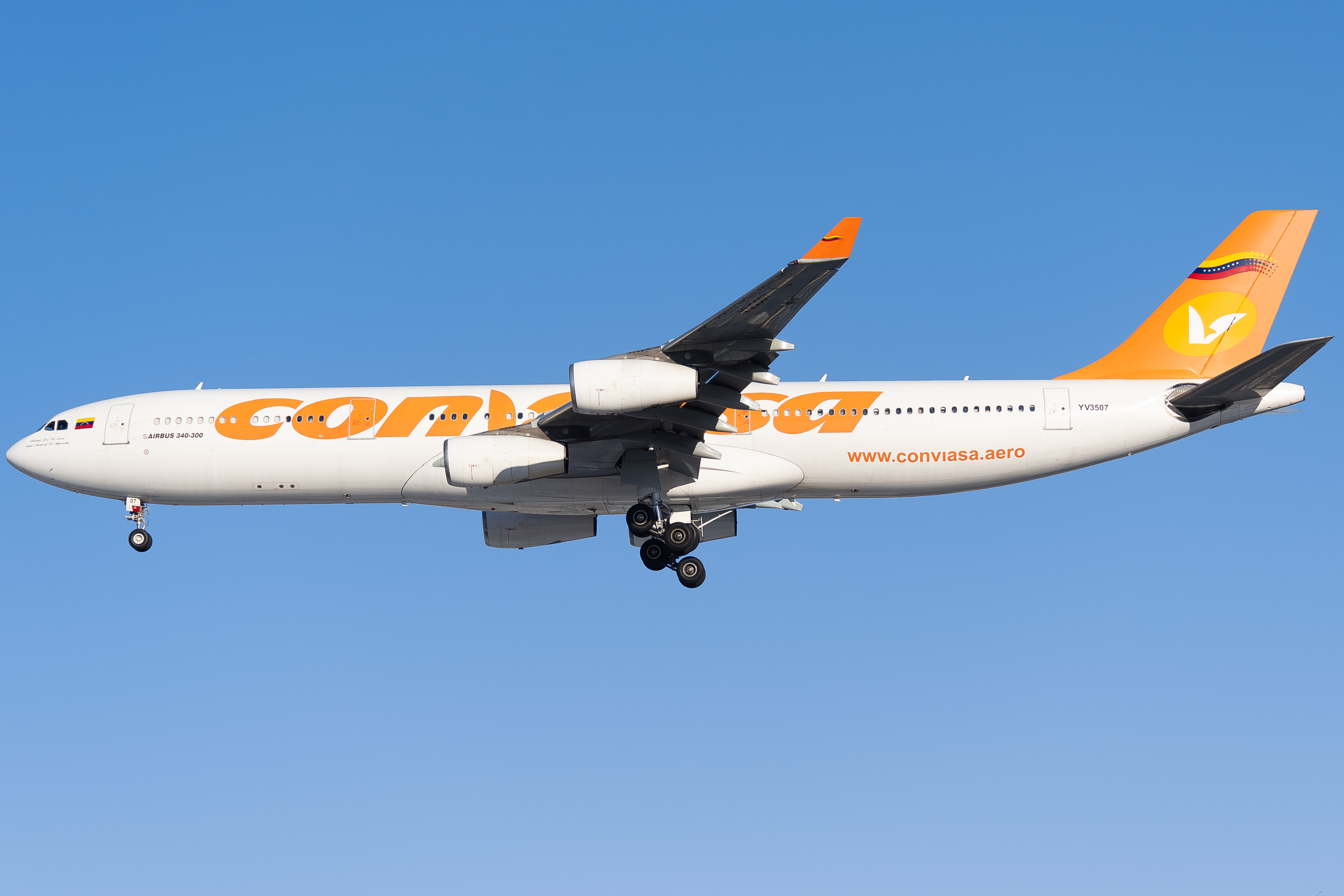
Conviasa Airbus A340-300

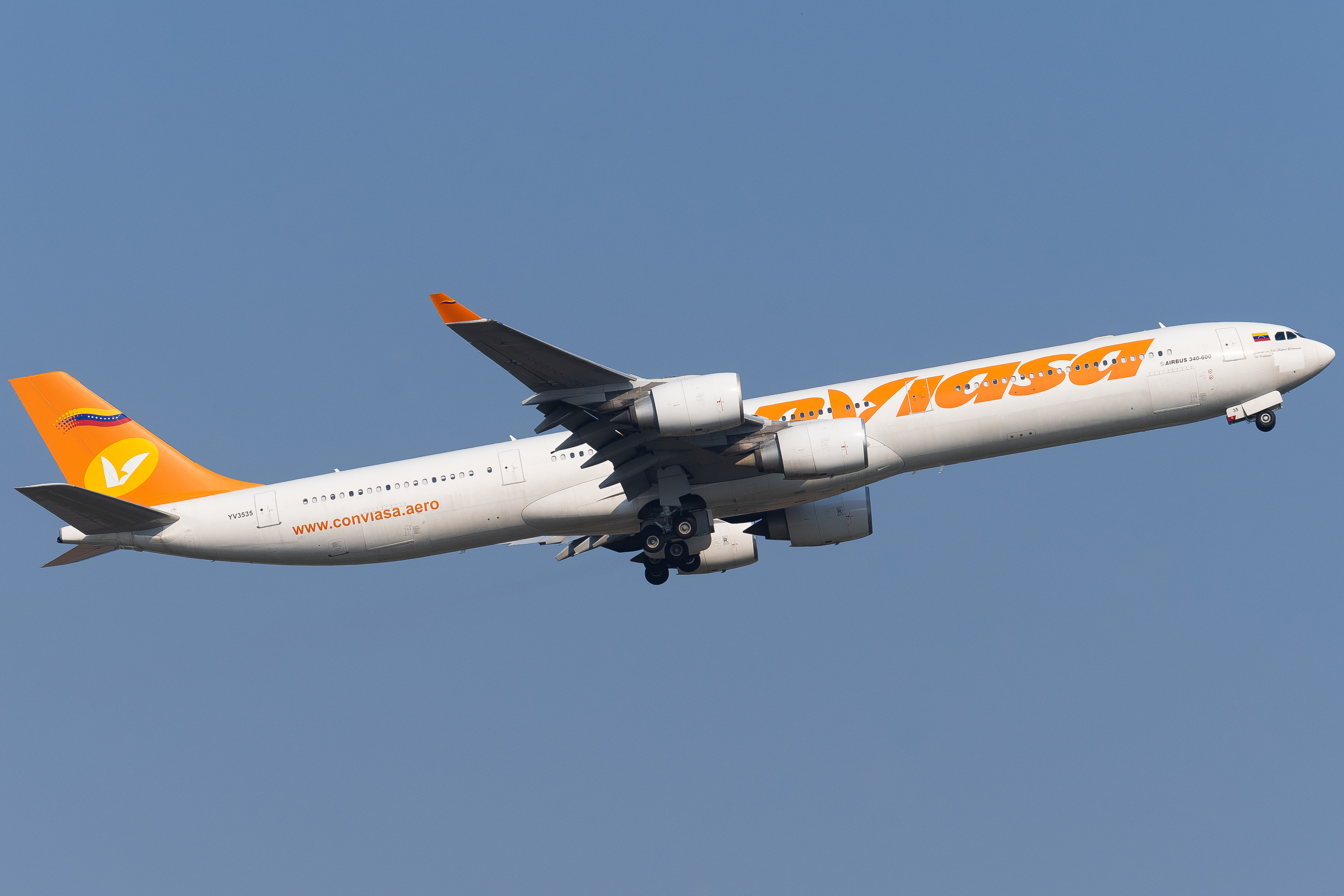
Conviasa Airbus A340-600

As of May 2025, the Conviasa fleet includes the following aircraft:

Conviasa fleet
Aircraft	In service	Orders	Passengers				Notes
Aircraft	In service	Orders	C	W	Y	Total	Notes
Airbus A340-200	2	—	—	42	276	318	One leased from Mahan Air.
Airbus A340-300	1	—	8	28	219	255	
Airbus A340-600	3	—	48	38	225	311	Leased from Mahan Air.
ATR 42-400	1	—	–	–	48	48	
Cessna 208B Grand Caravan	6	—	–	–	12	12	Operating under Conviasa Regional banner.
Embraer 190	15	—	–	–	104	104	9 aircraft parked.
Government fleet
Airbus ACJ319	1	—	VIP				Operating for the Government of Venezuela
Embraer Lineage 1000	1	—	VIP				Operating for the Government of Venezuela
Total	30	—					

=== Former ===
Conviasa had in the past operated the following aircraft:

Conviasa former fleet
Aircraft	Total	Introduced	Retired	Notes
Airbus A330-300	1	2015	2015	Leased from AirAsia X.
ATR 42-300	2	2006	2010	
ATR 72-200	3	2007	2013	
Boeing 737-200	10	2004	2012	
Boeing 737-200	1	2019	2019	Operated for the Government of Venezuela.
Boeing 737-300	4	2005	2016	
Boeing 747-400	2	2015	2017	Leased from Wamos Air.
Boeing 767-300ER	1	2014	2015	Operated by Blue Panorama Airlines.
Bombardier CRJ700	4	2009	2019	Leased from PDVSA.
De Havilland Canada Dash 7	2	2004	2010	

== Accidents and incidents ==
- On December 16, 2005, Conviasa Flight 2600, a De Havilland Canada Dash 7 (registered YV-1003) with 36 passengers and 4 crew members on board, was forced to make a belly landing at Porlamar's airport when the landing gear failed to deploy. After circling Porlamar for an hour and a half to burn off fuel, the aircraft touched down without any injuries.
- On August 30, 2008, a Boeing 737-200 (registered YV102T) took off from Caracas and was bound to Latacunga, Ecuador, 80 kilometers (50 miles) south of Quito. Three crew members (a captain, a first officer, and a mechanic) were on board. The aircraft crashed in the mountainous area in Ecuador's Andes, killing all three crew on board.
- On September 13, 2010, Conviasa Flight 2350, an ATR 42-300 (registered YV1010) with 47 passengers and 4 crew on board, crashed shortly before landing. It was a domestic scheduled passenger flight from Porlamar, Isla Margarita to Ciudad Guayana. There were 34 survivors and 17 fatalities.
- On August 13, 2012, Conviasa Flight 2197, an ATR 72-200 (registered YV2421), made a high-speed aborted takeoff resulting in a runway excursion close to a ravine. All 67 occupants on board sustained minor injuries, while the aircraft sustained minor damage.

== See also ==
- List of airlines of Venezuela
