= Conviasa Flight 2350 =

2010 aviation accident

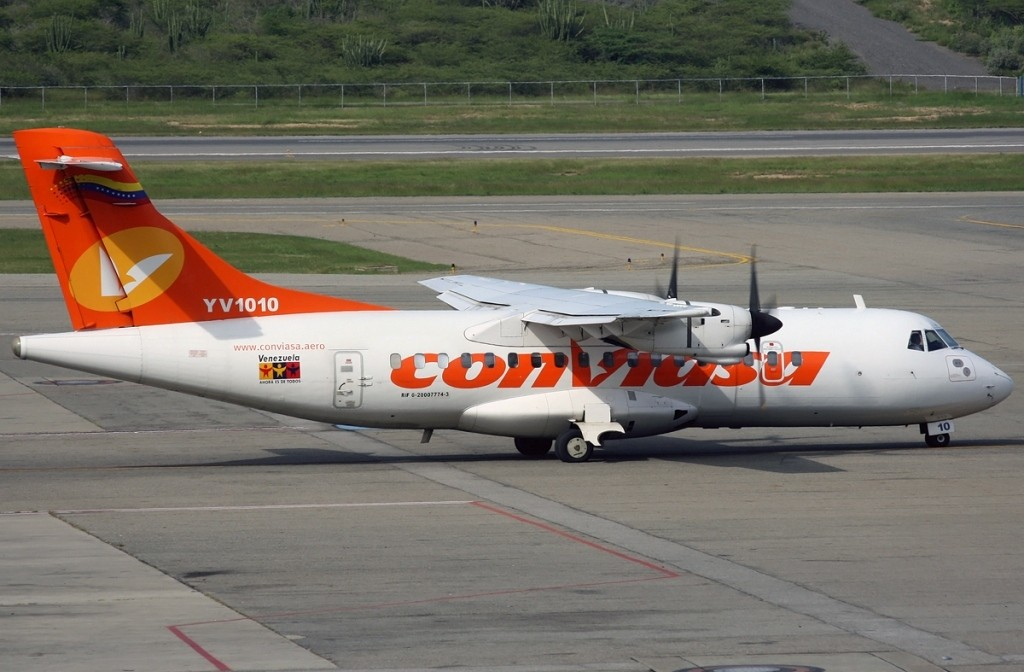
- YV1010, the aircraft involved in the accident, pictured in 2007

Accident
- Date: 13 September 2010
- Summary: Crashed on approach
- Site: Approx. 11 km south-west of Ciudad Guayana Airport, Venezuela; 08°14′37″N 062°51′07″W

Aircraft
- Aircraft type: ATR 42-320
- Operator: Conviasa
- IATA flight No.: V02350
- ICAO flight No.: VCV2350
- Registration: YV1010
- Flight origin: Santiago Mariño International Airport, Porlamar, Venezuela
- Destination: Manuel Carlos Piar Guayana Airport, Ciudad Guayana, Venezuela
- Occupants: 51
- Passengers: 47
- Crew: 4
- Fatalities: 17
- Injuries: 34
- Survivors: 34

On 13 September 2010, Conviasa Flight 2350, an ATR 42 on a domestic passenger service from Porlamar to Ciudad Guayana, Venezuela, crashed shortly before landing, killing 17 of the 51 people on board; 34 others were injured. The aircraft, a twin-turboprop ATR 42-320, went down in an industrial area after the crew reported control problems.

== Accident ==
The flight crew reported control problems shortly before landing at Manuel Carlos Piar Guayana Airport, in the Puerto Ordaz neighbourhood of Ciudad Guayana. Witnesses said that the aircraft struck power lines at low altitude at 09:59 local time, and went down in an industrial area where materials used in a steel mill were stored. Workers from the steel mill and firefighters pulled the survivors from the burning wreckage.

== Aircraft ==
The accident aircraft was a twin-turboprop ATR 42-320 with Venezuelan registration YV1010, c/n 371. The aircraft made its first flight in 1994. It had originally served with Gill Airways before being sold to Air Wales. The aircraft was bought by Conviasa in September 2006. At the time of the accident, it had accumulated over 25,000 flight hours and completed over 27,000 landings.

== Passengers and crew ==
Forty-seven passengers and four crew were on board the aircraft.

In command of Flight 2350 was Captain Ramiro Cadena Cárdenas (age 62), who was accompanied by First Officer Luis Alberto Albarrán (38).

While the death toll was initially reported as 14, later reports revised it upwards to 15 and later to 17 as survivors of the initial crash died of injuries sustained. A total of 34 people survived the crash. Both the captain and first officer were killed.

== Aftermath ==
Venezuelan president Hugo Chávez declared three days of national mourning after the crash.

As a result of the crash, on 13 September 2010 Trinidad and Tobago's Civil Aviation Authority suspended Conviasa's services into that country. After the suspension, there were concerns about Trinidadian residents being stranded on Margarita Island. Conviasa, as of 2010, was the only airline to offer direct flights from Trinidad to Margarita Island, offering two or three flights per week.

On 17 September 2010, the Government of Venezuela grounded all Conviasa flights so that it could perform a technical review of the airline's fleet. The airline said that the temporary suspension would remain in effect until 1 October 2010, and that during the shutdown, passengers would be carried on other airlines.

== Investigation ==
Assistance in the investigation was given by the French Bureau of Enquiry and Analysis for Civil Aviation Safety (BEA). The BEA provided two investigators, and Avions de Transport Regional (ATR) provided three technical advisers.

On 30 December 2014 the Ministry of Water and Air Transport of Venezuela published that the probable cause of the accident was the malfunction of the central crew alerting system with erroneous activation of the stall warning system. Contributing factors were weaknesses of the flight crew's resource management, their loss of situational awareness, their inadequate coordination during the decision-making process to deal with abnormal situations in flight, their lack of knowledge of the stall warning system, and their mishandling of the flight controls. The aircraft was flown with two abnormal conditions, activation of the stall warning system and the decoupling of the elevators of the aircraft, requiring a constant effort by the pilot in command to maintain control of the aircraft. There was improper handling of the aircraft in the final phase of landing, which led the commander to exercise great effort on controlling the flight before impact. The commander's defective emotional and cognitive skill level, lack of leadership, and errors of judgment led him to make unwise decisions. Both pilots showed confusion, poor coordination in the cockpit, serious failures in communication, lack of knowledge of the aircraft systems and loss of situational awareness.

== See also ==
- Santa Bárbara Airlines Flight 518, an ATR-42 that crashed in Venezuela in 2008.
