= Juan Pablo Pérez Alfonzo Airport =

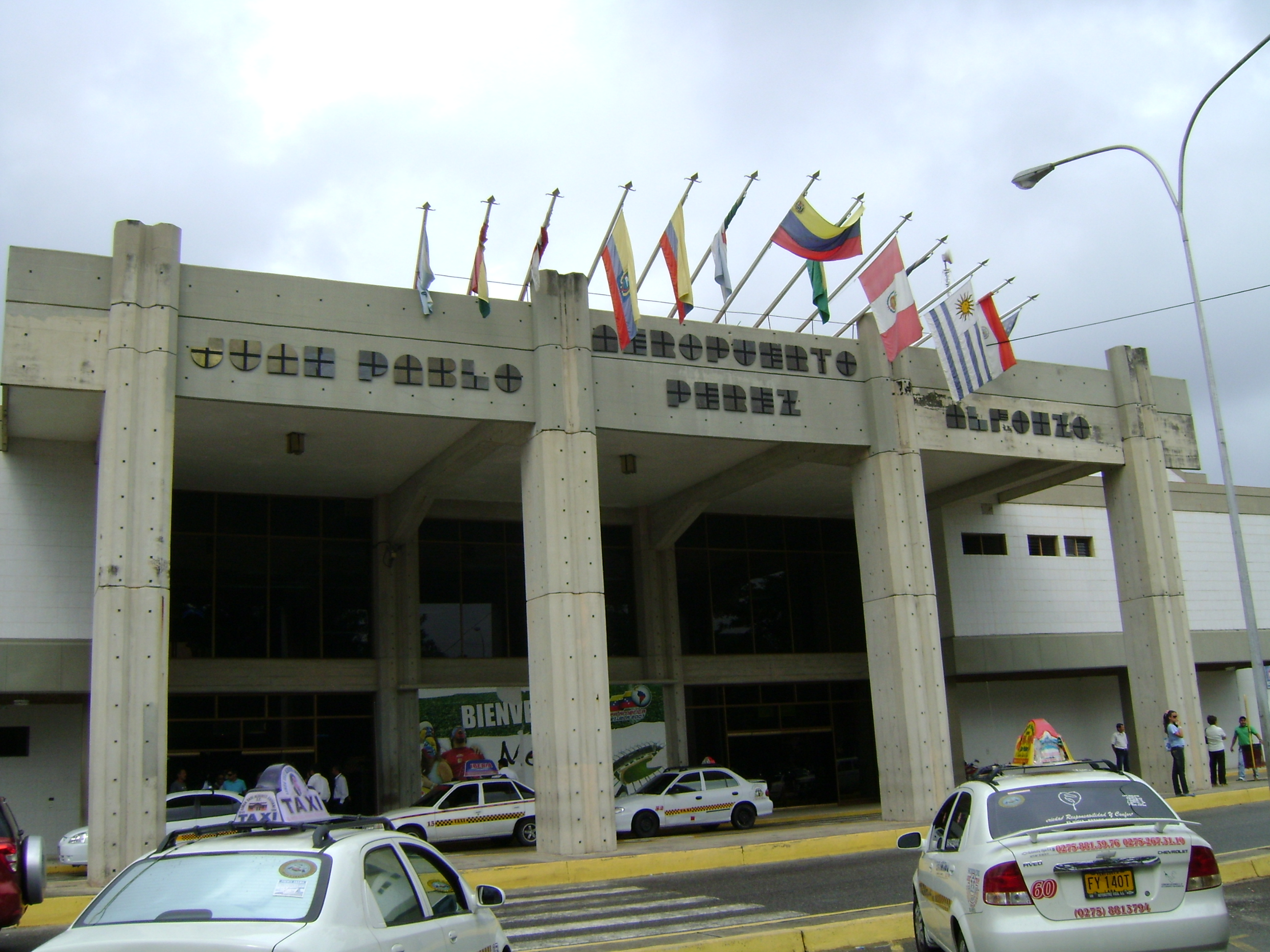
- Aeropuerto Juan Pablo Pérez Alfonzo
- IATA: VIG; ICAO: SVVG

Summary
- Airport type: Public
- Location: El Vigía, Venezuela
- Elevation AMSL: 249 ft / 76 m
- Coordinates: 8°37′25″N 71°40′25″W

Map
- Location of the airport in Venezuela

Runways
| Direction | Length | | Surface |
| Direction | m | ft | Surface |
|---|---|---|---|
| 09/27 | 3,235 | 10,614 | Asphalt |
- Sources: GCM Google Maps

Juan Pablo Pérez Alfonzo Airport (IATA: VIG, ICAO: SVVG) is an airport serving El Vigía, a city in Mérida state in Venezuela. It opened in 1991, and was named for the Venezuelan politician Juan Pablo Pérez Alfonzo (1903–1979). (Note: Though often misspelled Alfonso, the correct name is Alfonzo, as confirmed by the photo and other official sources and the majority of reliable references.)

The runway length includes a 490-metre (1,610 ft) displaced threshold on Runway 27.

The El Vigia non-directional beacon (Ident: EVG) is located on the field.

The airport formerly serves international flights to Colombia, Aruba and Curaçao but it was stopped following year.

== Airlines and destinations ==
| Airlines | Destinations |
|---|---|
| Aerolineas Estelar | Caracas |
| Aeropostal | Caracas |
| Avior Airlines | Caracas |
| Conviasa | Caracas, Porlamar |
| LASER Airlines | Caracas |
| Turpial Airlines | Porlamar (begins 22 September 2026) |

== See also ==
- Transport in Venezuela
- List of airports in Venezuela
