= José Tadeo Monagas International Airport =

José Tadeo Monagas International Airport Maturín Airport
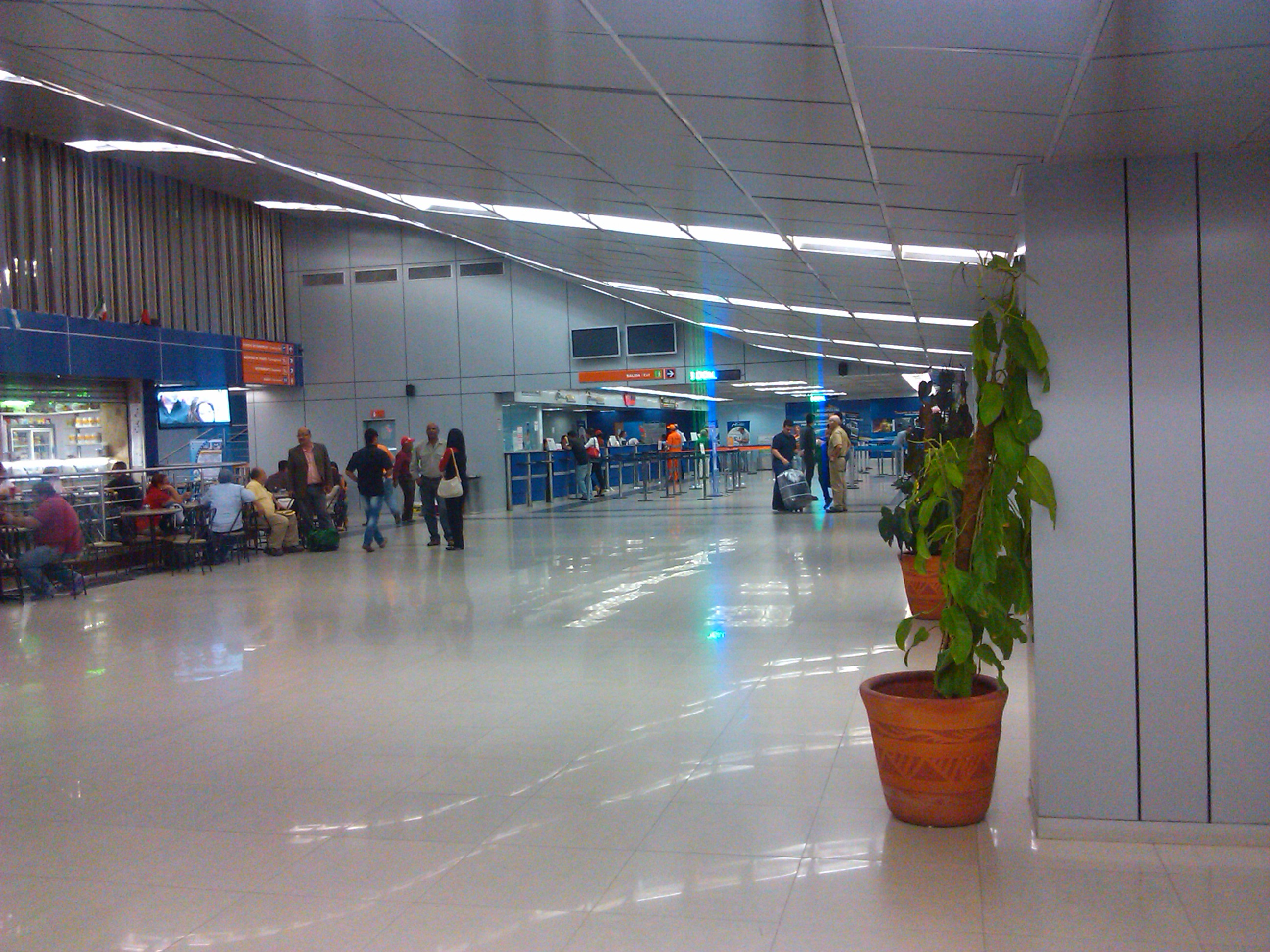
- IATA: MUN; ICAO: SVMT

Summary
- Airport type: Public
- Location: Maturín, Venezuela
- Elevation AMSL: 213 ft / 65 m
- Coordinates: 9°44′55″N 63°09′15″W

Map
- Location of the airport in Venezuela

Runways
Direction	Length		Surface
Direction	m	ft	Surface
06/24	2,100	6,890	Asphalt
- Sources: GCM

José Tadeo Monagas International Airport (IATA: MUN, ICAO: SVMT) is an airport serving Maturín, the capital of the state of Monagas in Venezuela.

== Airlines and destinations ==
Airlines	Destinations
Aerolineas Estelar	Caracas
Conviasa	Caracas, Maracaibo, Porlamar, Santo Domingo del Táchira, Tucupita
LASER Airlines	Caracas
RUTACA Airlines	San Antonio del Táchira

== See also ==
- Transport in Venezuela
- List of airports in Venezuela
