= Mayor Buenaventura Vivas Airport =

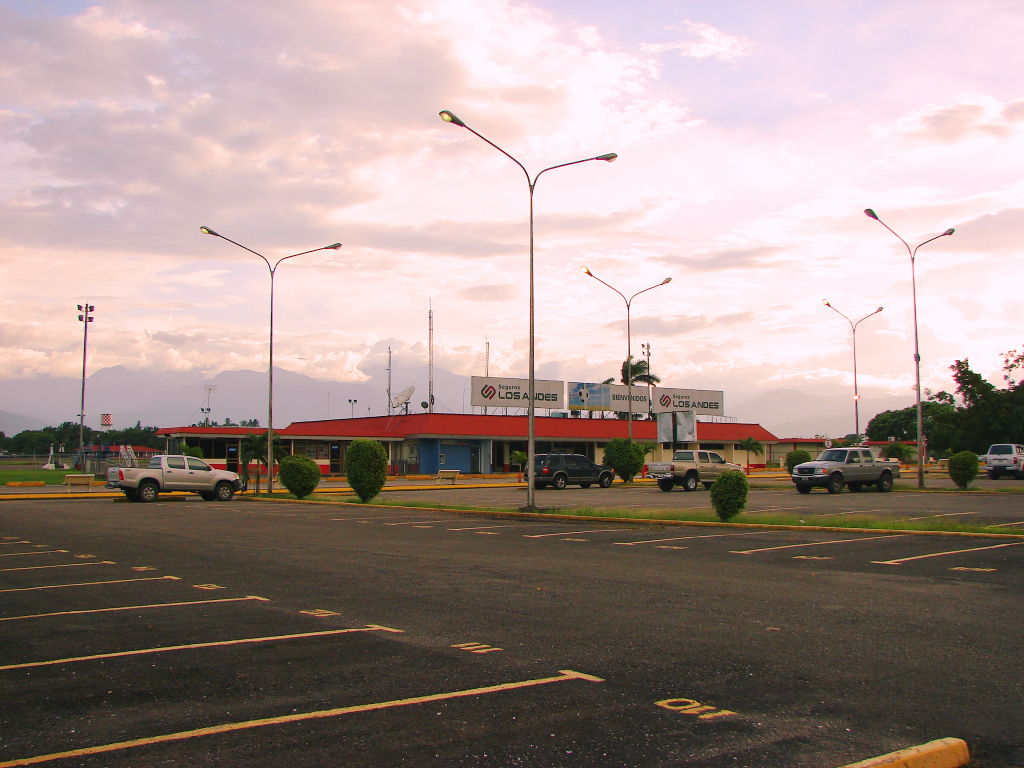
- IATA: STD; ICAO: SVSO

Summary
- Airport type: Civil/Military
- Location: Santo Domingo, Táchira, Venezuela
- Elevation AMSL: 1,083 ft / 330 m
- Coordinates: 7°33′55″N 72°02′10″W

Map
- Location of the airport in Venezuela

Runways
Direction	Length		Surface
Direction	m	ft	Surface
12/30	3,030	9,941	Asphalt
- Sources: WAD GCM Google Maps

Mayor Buenaventura Vivas Airport (IATA: STD, ICAO: SVSO), is an airport serving Santo Domingo in the Táchira state of Venezuela.

The runway is just southwest of the town. The Santo Domingo VORTAC (Ident: STD) is located in the town.

== Airlines and destinations ==
Airlines	Destinations
Aerolíneas Estelar	Caracas, Maracaibo
Conviasa	Caracas, Maturín, Porlamar
LASER Airlines	Caracas
RUTACA Airlines	Caracas
Turpial Airlines	Valencia (VE)

== See also ==
- Transport in Venezuela
- List of airports in Venezuela
