= General José Francisco Bermúdez Airport =

- IATA: CUP; ICAO: SVCP

Summary
- Airport type: General
- Serves: Carúpano, Venezuela
- Elevation AMSL: 85 ft (26 m)
- Coordinates: 10°39′35″N 063°15′40″W

Map
- Location of the airport in Venezuela

Runways
Direction	Length		Surface
Direction	m	ft	Surface
17/35	2,000	6,562	Asphalt
- Sources: GCM Google Maps

General José Francisco Bermúdez Airport (IATA: CUP, ICAO: SVCP) is an airport serving the Caribbean coastal city of Carúpano, Venezuela. The airport is named in honor of José Francisco Bermúdez, a general in the Venezuelan War of Independence.

The Carupano non-directional beacon (Ident: CUP) is located on the field.

== Airlines and destinations ==
Airlines	Destinations
Conviasa	Porlamar

== See also ==
- Transport in Venezuela
- List of airports in Venezuela
