= Simón Bolívar International Airport (Venezuela) =

International airport in Maiquetía, Venezuela

Caracas International Airport Aeropuerto Internacional de Maiquetía "Simón Bolívar"
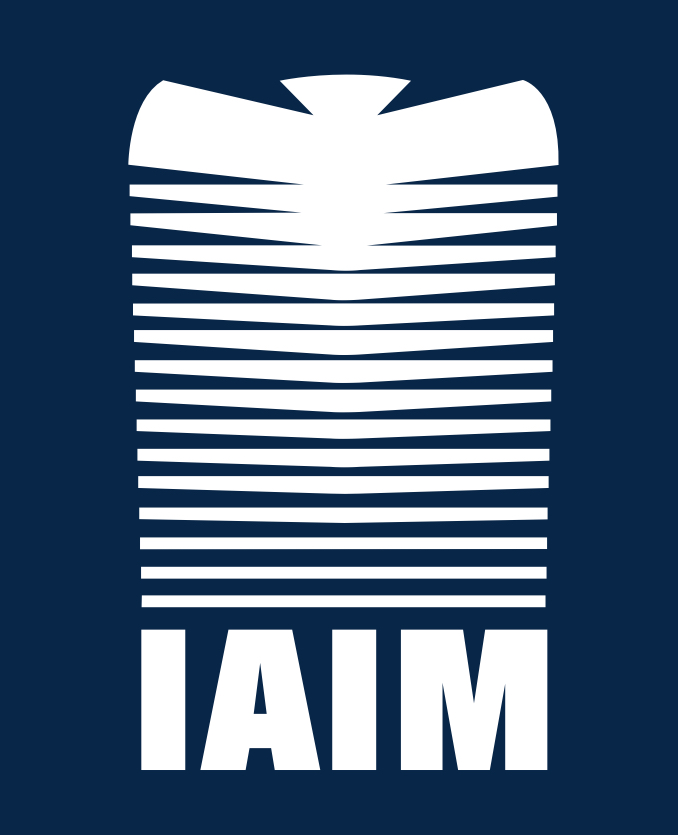

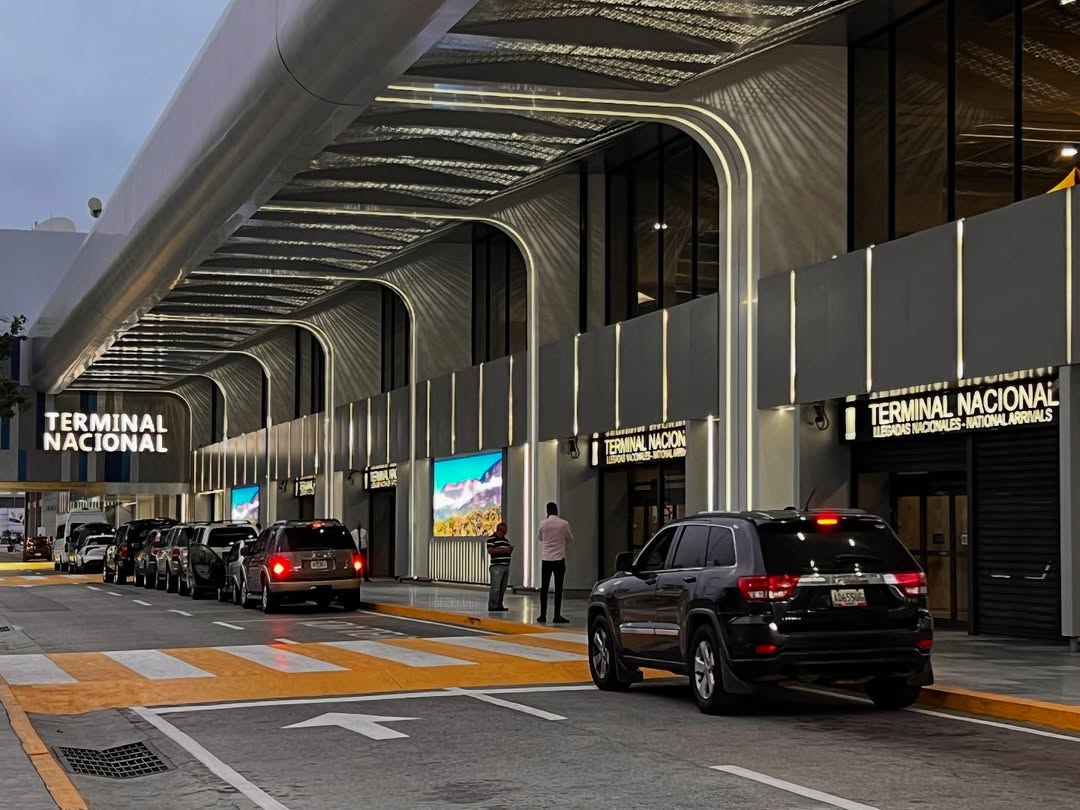
- IATA: CCS; ICAO: SVMI

Summary
- Airport type: Public
- Owner/Operator: Maiquetía International Airport Autonomous Institute
- Serves: Caracas, Venezuela
- Location: Maiquetía
- Hub for: Avior Airlines; Aerolíneas Estelar; Conviasa; LASER Airlines; RUTACA Airlines; Venezolana
- Elevation AMSL: 235 ft (72 m)
- Coordinates: 10°36′11″N 066°59′26″W
- Website: https://www.aeropuerto-maiquetia.com.ve

Map
- Location of airport in Venezuela

Runways
Direction	Length		Surface
Direction	m	ft	Surface
10/28	3,610	11,483	Asphalt
09/27	3,270	9,930	Asphalt

Statistics (2022)
- Total passengers: 8,244,064

Maiquetía "Simón Bolívar" International Airport (IATA: CCS, ICAO: SVMI, Spanish: Aeropuerto Internacional de Maiquetía "Simón Bolívar") is an international airport located in Maiquetía, Vargas, Venezuela, serving Caracas, the capital of the country, the center of which is about 21 kilometres (13 mi) to the west. Commonly known simply as Maiquetía by the local population, it is the main international air passenger gateway to Venezuela. The airport handles flights to several destinations in Central and South America as well as a few services to Spain, Russia and China although many international routes have been terminated since 2014.

== History ==
=== Early years (1945−2012) ===
The airport opened in 1945 as the Maiquetía International Airport (Aeropuerto Internacional de Maiquetía). The site had been recommended as an appropriate location for an airport by Charles Lindbergh on behalf of Pan Am. The USA subsidised the construction of the airport as part of the Airport Development Program. The original passenger terminal was designed by architect Luis Malaussena.

In the 1950s, under the regime of dictator Marcos Pérez Jiménez, road transport between the airport and the capital was improved by the inauguration of the Caracas-La Guaira highway, and the La Guaira and Caracas Railway, dating from the nineteenth century, was closed.

Between 1952 and 1962, two new wings were added to the passenger terminal, and the runway was expanded to 2,000 metres (6,600 ft). Lighting was installed on the runway and approach zones to allow night operations. A new runway was built in 1956, and in 1962 extended to 3,000 metres (9,800 ft) long by 60 metres (200 ft) wide.

From the late 1970s until the 1980s Air France operated a weekly service by the Anglo-French supersonic airliner Concorde between Caracas and Paris, with a stop at the airport of Santa Maria in the Atlantic Ocean Azores archipelago.

In the 1970s a new international terminal was constructed to offer increased capacity, with a domestic terminal opening in 1983. Viasa, the flag-carrier of Venezuela, ceased operations on 23 January 1997. Since 2000, the airport has been undergoing major changes in order to meet international standards and to improve passenger traffic, security, immigration areas, and customs areas. Security measures have become top priority since the September 11, 2001 attacks, and departure and arrival areas are completely separate, in the lower and upper levels of the airport. Proyecto Maiquetía 2000 (Project Maiquetia 2000) was completed in 2007, adding added new customs and immigration areas, a new cargo terminal, and a connecting passageway between the domestic and international terminal.

In March 2007, Iran Air introduced service to Tehran via Damascus. It had a codeshare agreement with Conviasa, which took over the route seven months later. Conviasa ended its non-stop service to Damascus in August 2012.

=== Crisis in Venezuela (2012−2026) ===
During the crisis in Bolivarian Venezuela, continuing as of 2025, domestic airlines are laboring under tremendous difficulties because of hyperinflation and parts shortages. Many international airlines left the country, including Aeroméxico, Aerolíneas Argentinas, Air Canada, Alitalia, Avianca, Delta Air Lines, Lufthansa, LATAM, and United Airlines, making travel to the country difficult. According to the International Air Transport Association (IATA), the Bolivarian government has not paid US$3.8 billion to international airlines in a currency issue involving conversion of local currency to U.S. dollars. Reasons for airlines to leave also include crime against flight crews, stolen baggage, and problems with the quality of jet fuel and maintenance of runways.

In 2016, the jetways in the international terminal were replaced with new glass-walled jetways. Following the increasing economic partnership between Venezuela and Turkey in October 2016, Turkish Airlines started offering direct flights from December 2016 connecting between Caracas to Istanbul (via Havana, Cuba) in an effort to "link and expand contacts" between the two countries.

By 2018, terminals in the airport lacked air conditioning and utilities such as water and electricity. Flight crews were often sent to stay in different cities to avoid crime that occurs in the area. The company charged with providing sanitation services ceased to exist, so the airport buildings were cleaned less frequently. The Bolivarian National Guard, tasked with providing security, often extorted travellers by force.

In support of President Nicolas Maduro's government, Russian Air Force aircraft, including Tupolev Tu-160 bombers, were deployed to the airport in early December 2018. In March 2019, two Russian planes were deployed to the airport carrying 100 troops and 35 tonnes of matériel; they stayed until 26 June 2019, according to a Russian embassy announcement.

American Airlines, the last U.S. airline serving Venezuela, left on 15 March 2019, after its pilots refused to fly to Venezuela, citing safety issues. Two months later, the United States Department of Transportation and Department of Homeland Security indefinitely suspended all flights between Venezuela and the United States, due to safety and security concerns. The suspension affects mainly Venezuelan airlines that flew to Miami: Avior Airlines, LASER Airlines, and Estelar Latinoamerica.

During the COVID-19 pandemic, the government announced on 3 February 2020 that the country had imposed epidemiological surveillance, restrictions and diagnostic systems to detect possible COVID-19 cases at this airport and that Venezuela would receive a diagnostic kit for the virus strain from the Pan American Health Organization (PAHO).

Following the 2024 Venezuelan presidential election, flights to Panama and Dominican Republic were suspended on 31 July 2024.

=== Post-Maduro period and the earthquakes (2026−present) ===
In 2026, three weeks after the ousting of then-president Nicolás Maduro, US President Donald Trump ordered the country's acting president Delcy Rodríguez to reopen flights to the Venezuelan airspace after a 7-year hiatus and scheduled international flights to Miami, Florida. The first flights were operated by American Airlines in April 2026, which last served the route in March 2019.

On 24 June 2026, two major earthquakes struck northern Venezuela and severely damaged infrastructure across the area. Due to the damage sustained, the airport was forced to close indefinitely. Temporary buildings were constructed serving as terminals, flights resumed at half capacity on 5 August 2026.

== Gallery ==
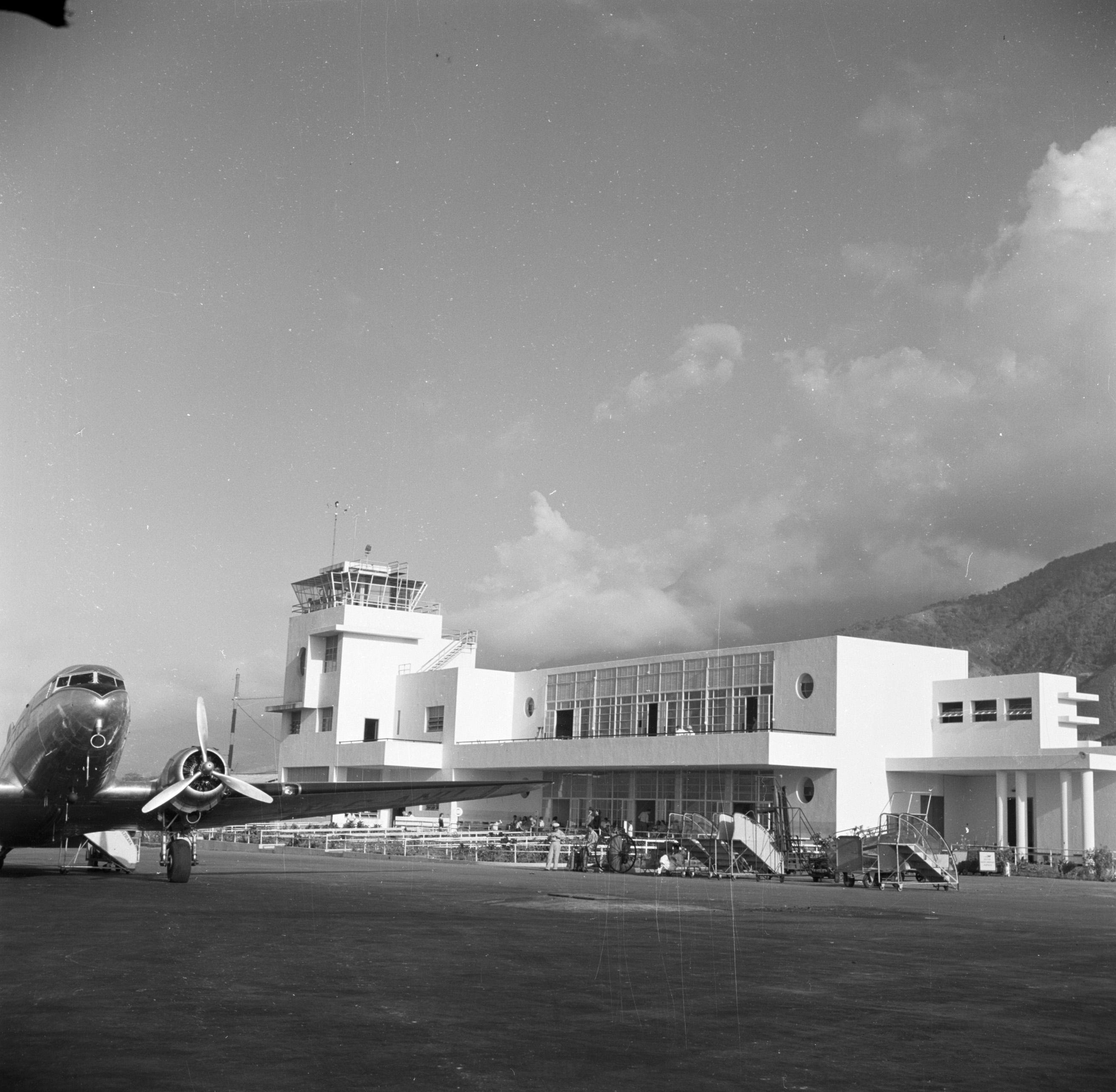
The airport in 1948

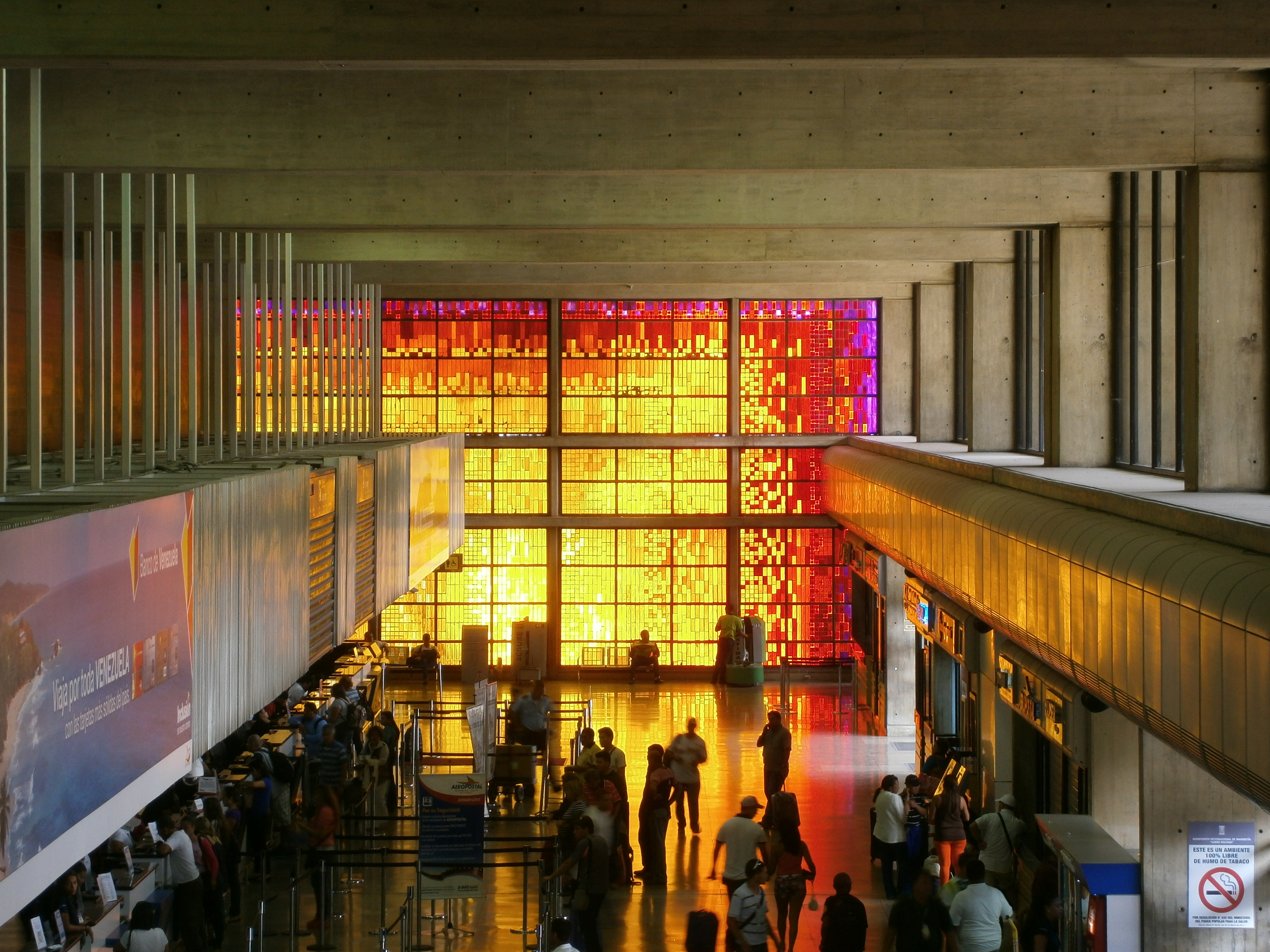
Terminal interior

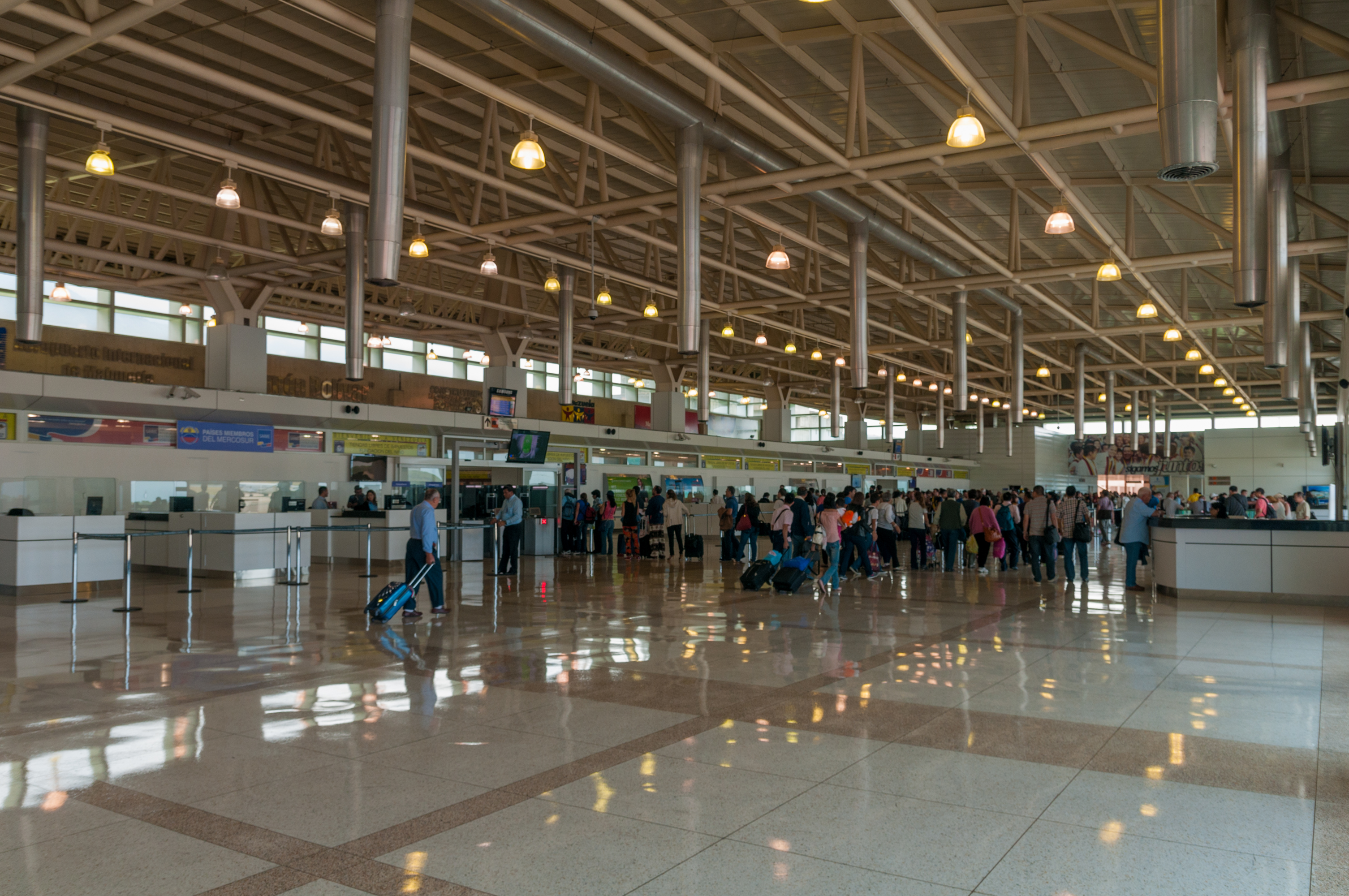
Main terminal

== Airlines and destinations ==
=== Passenger ===
The following airlines operate regular scheduled passenger flights at Simón Bolívar International Airport:

Airlines	Destinations
AeroCaribe	Los Roques
Aerolíneas Estelar	Barinas, El Vigía, Madrid, Maracaibo, Maturín, Panama City–Tocumen, Porlamar, Puerto Ordaz, San Antonio del Táchira, Santo Domingo del Táchira
Aeroregional	Quito
Air Century	Punta Cana, Santo Domingo
Air Europa	Madrid
American Airlines	Miami
American Eagle	Miami
Avianca	Bogotá
Avior Airlines	Barcelona (VE), Barquisimeto, Bogotá, Curaçao, El Vigía, Las Piedras, Maracaibo, Medellín–JMC, Porlamar, Puerto Ordaz
Conviasa	Acarigua, Barbados, Barcelona (VE), Barinas, Canaima, Cancún, Cumaná, El Vigía, Guangzhou, Havana, La Fría, Las Piedras, Los Roques, Maracaibo, Maturín, Mérida (VE), Mexico City–Felipe Ángeles, Porlamar, Puerto Ayacucho, Puerto Ordaz, San Antonio del Táchira, San Fernando de Apure, Santo Domingo del Táchira, St. Vincent–Argyle, Valera
Caribbean Airlines	Port of Spain
Copa Airlines	Panama City–Tocumen
Gol Linhas Aéreas	São Paulo–Guarulhos
Iberia	Madrid
ITA Airways	Rome–Fiumicino (begins 30 March 2027)
LASER Airlines	Barcelona (VE), Bogotá, Curaçao, El Vigía, La Fría, Madrid, Miami, Maracaibo, Maturín, Porlamar, Puerto Ordaz, Santo Domingo, Santo Domingo del Táchira
LATAM Colombia	Bogotá
LATAM Chile	Santiago de Chile (resumes 3 January 2027)
Plus Ultra Líneas Aéreas	Madrid, Tenerife–North
Qatar Airways	Doha
RUTACA Airlines	Barcelona (VE), Coro, Ciudad Bolívar, Las Piedras, Manaus, Maracaibo, Maturín, Porlamar, Puerto Ordaz, Punta Cana, San Antonio del Táchira, Santo Domingo del Táchira, Valencia (VE)
SASCA	Los Roques
TAP Air Portugal	Lisbon; Seasonal: Funchal
Turkish Airlines	Istanbul
Turpial Airlines	Bogotá
United Airlines	Houston–Intercontinental (resumes 12 January 2027)
Venezolana	Maracaibo, Panama City–Tocumen, Porlamar
Wingo	Bogotá, Medellín–JMC

=== Cargo ===
Airlines	Destinations
Amerijet International	Miami
Avianca Cargo	Bogotá
Cargojet	Santo Domingo-Las Américas
Sky Lease Cargo	Miami

=== Chronology of former international flights ===
In 2004, KLM Dutch Airlines It was the first major airline to end its operations in Venezuela citting official reason the "consolidation" of operations with their partners Air France, making its last flight to Venezuela in February 2005. In 2005, British Airways also stopped operating direct flights to Venezuela from London in February 2005, because the route continued to lose money and the decision was due to commercial reasons.

Since 2014, foreign and domestic carriers have reduced and/or terminated their presence due to political instability and their inability to recover US$3.8 billion in funds owed to airlines. Some carriers have scheduled stops in nearby countries so that flight crews do not have to stay overnight in Caracas, considered unsafe.

In November 2025, Venezuela withdrew operating permits from six airlines, Iberia, TAP, Avianca, Latam Colombia, Turkish Airlines, and Gol, after they suspended their routes following a US warning about risks in Venezuelan airspace.

The table below outlines the chronology of route terminations since 2013.

Airline	Destination	Flight frequency	Terminated/Suspended
Aerolíneas Argentinas	(Argentina) Buenos Aires–Ezeiza	1 flight per week	5 August 2017
Aeroméxico	Mexico City–Benito Juárez	3 flights per week	23 June 2016
Air Canada	(Canada) Toronto–Pearson	4 flights per week	18 March 2014
Air France	(France) Paris–Charles de Gaulle	4 flights per week	24 September 2020
American Airlines	(Puerto Rico) San Juan–LMM	Daily flights	1 July 2014
American Airlines	(United States) Dallas–Fort Worth	1 flight per week	1 July 2014
American Airlines	(United States) New York–JFK	5 flights per week	4 April 2016
Avianca Costa Rica	(Costa Rica) San José (CR)	Daily flights	7 April 2014 (1st); 28 February 2024 (2nd)
Delta Air Lines	(United States) Atlanta	4 flights per week	16 September 2017
Dynamic Airways	(United States) Fort Lauderdale–Hollywood	Daily flights	13 August 2016
Dynamic Airways	(United States) New York–JFK	2 flights per week	1 August 2017
LATAM Brasil	(Brazil) São Paulo–Guarulhos	1 flight per week	28 May 2016
LATAM Chile	(Chile) Santiago	2 flights per week	1 August 2016
LATAM Chile	(United States) Miami	1 flight per week	1 August 2016
Lufthansa	(Germany) Frankfurt	3 flights per week	17 June 2016
United Airlines	(United States) Newark	5 flights per week	20 January 2013

== Other facilities ==
From 1960 to 1997, it was the main hub for Viasa, Venezuela's former flag carrier until it went bankrupt in January 1997. It was also the hub for Avensa, Servivensa. Conviasa started operation in 2004, hoping to become a major airline, and flag carrier. However, due to their low pay, several pilots were leaving Conviasa from 2016 after getting "better offers from other countries". The headquarters of Conviasa is located on the airport grounds.

== Accidents and incidents ==
- On 27 November 1956, Linea Aeropostal Flight 253, a Lockheed Constellation, crashed while on final approach to Caracas Airport. All 25 passengers and crew on board were killed.
- On 12 December 1968, Pan Am Flight 217 crashed while on approach to Caracas. All 51 passengers and crew on board were killed.
- On 3 December 1969, Air France Flight 212 crashed shortly after takeoff from Simón Bolívar International Airport. All 62 passengers and crew on board were killed.
- On 3 November 1980, a Latin Carga Convair CV-880 crashed on take-off from the airport, killing its four occupants and destroying the aircraft, registration YV-145C, which had flown from 1962 to January 1974 for US Delta Air Lines, then sold to Latin Carga in 1979.
- On September 24, 2025, a Learjet 55, registration YV-3440, crashed during take-off, injuring at least two passengers.

== In popular culture ==
The airport is shown in the 1981 movie Menudo: La Película, when a pair of Menudo's friends board a flight during the film's final scenes. The airport is also shown in the 1975 French film Le Sauvage starring Catherine Deneuve and Yves Montand, and several soap-opera and movie key scenes were filmed at the airport.

== See also ==
- Los Roques Airport – an airport serving Los Roques archipelago national park, remotely controlled from Simón Bolívar International Airport
- List of airports in Venezuela
- List of airlines of Venezuela
