= Antonio José de Sucre Airport =

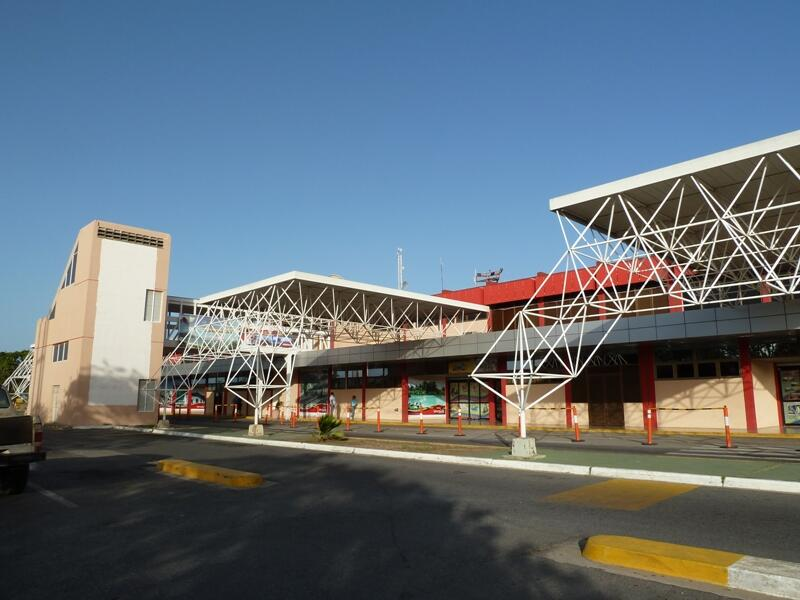
- IATA: CUM; ICAO: SVCU

Summary
- Airport type: Public
- Serves: Cumaná, Venezuela
- Elevation AMSL: 25 ft (7.6 m)
- Coordinates: 10°27′00″N 64°07′50″W

Map
- Location of airport in Venezuela

Runways
Direction	Length		Surface
Direction	m	ft	Surface
08/26	3,100	10,171	Asphalt
- Sources: GCM

Antonio José de Sucre Airport (IATA: CUM, ICAO: SVCU) is a commercial airport serving Cumaná, the capital of Sucre state in Venezuela.

== Airline and destination ==
Airlines	Destinations
Conviasa	Caracas

== Historical airline service ==
- AeroEjecutivos
- Aerolineas Estelar
- Aeropostal
- Avensa
- Avior Airlines
- RUTACA Airlines
- Santa Bárbara Airlines
- Venezolana

Aeropostal flew to Caracas with McDonnell Douglas MD-80s from 2013 until 2018.

Avior Airlines operated to Caracas using a Beechcraft 1900D before its retirement in 2010.

Estelar operated to Caracas using Boeing 737s from 2016 until 2022

RUTACA Airlines operated to Porlamar and Caracas using a Cessna 208B Caravan.

From mid 2008 until 2009, Santa Bárbara Airlines operated to Caracas using an ATR-42.

Venezolana operated to Porlamar and Caracas from late 2008 using Jetstream 41s. After its retirement in 2010, it started using Boeing 737-200s and McDonnell Douglas MD-80s until 2016.

== See also ==
- Transport in Venezuela
- List of airports in Venezuela
