= Oswaldo Guevara Mujica Airport =

Oswaldo Guevara Mujica Airport Aeropuerto Gral. Bgda. Oswaldo Guevara Mujica
- IATA: AGV; ICAO: SVAC

Summary
- Airport type: Public
- Operator: Government
- Serves: Acarigua, Venezuela
- Elevation AMSL: 226 m (741 ft)
- Coordinates: 9°33′12″N 69°14′15″W

Map
- Location of the airport in Venezuela

Runways
Direction	Length		Surface
Direction	m	ft	Surface
11/29	1,800	5,906	Asphalt
05/23	750	2,461	Asphalt
- Sources: WAD GCM Google Maps

Oswaldo Guevara Mujica Airport (Spanish: Aeropuerto General de Brigada Oswaldo Guevara Mujica) (IATA: AGV, ICAO: SVAC), is an airport serving Acarigua, a city in the Portuguesa state of Venezuela.

The Acarigua VOR-DME (Ident: AGV) and non-directional beacon (Ident: AGV) are located on the field.

== Airlines and destinations ==
Airlines	Destinations
Avior Airlines	Caracas
Conviasa	Caracas, Porlamar

== See also ==
- Transport in Venezuela
- List of airports in Venezuela
