= La Fría Airport =

La Fría Airport Francisco García de Hevia Airport
- IATA: LFR; ICAO: SVLF

Summary
- Airport type: Public
- Location: La Fria, Venezuela
- Elevation AMSL: 323 ft / 98 m
- Coordinates: 8°14′20″N 72°16′15″W

Map
- Location of the airport in Venezuela

Runways
Direction	Length		Surface
Direction	m	ft	Surface
01/19	2,025	6,644	Asphalt
- Sources: GCM

La Fría Airport (IATA: LFR, ICAO: SVLF), also known as Francisco García de Hevia International Airport, is an airport serving La Fría, a town in the Táchira state of Venezuela. The runway is 2 kilometres (1.2 mi) northwest of the town.

== Airlines and destinations ==
Airlines	Destinations
Conviasa	Caracas, Porlamar
LASER Airlines	Caracas

== See also ==
- Transport in Venezuela
- List of airports in Venezuela
