= Juan Vicente Gómez International Airport =

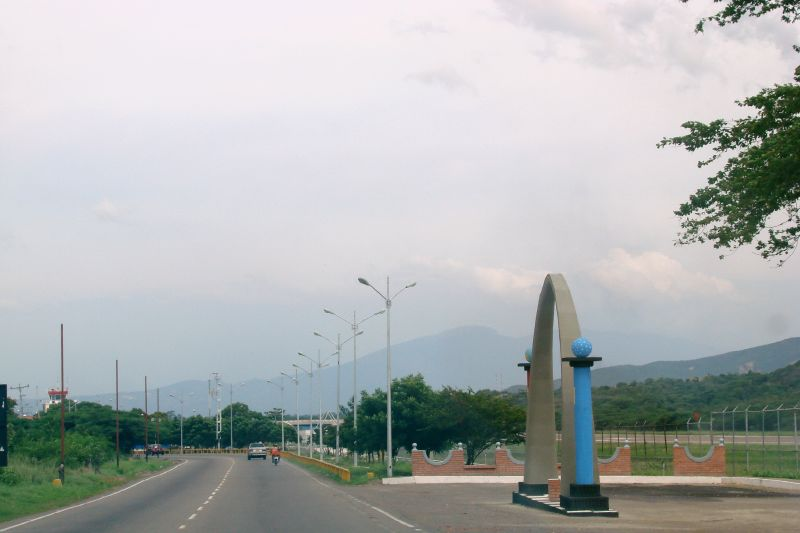
- IATA: SVZ; ICAO: SVSA

Summary
- Airport type: Public
- Operator: BAER Aeropuertos
- Serves: San Antonio del Táchira, Venezuela and Cúcuta, Colombia
- Elevation AMSL: 1,316 ft / 401 m
- Coordinates: 7°50′27″N 72°26′24″W

Map
- Location of airport in Venezuela

Runways
Direction	Length		Surface
Direction	m	ft	Surface
17/35	1,850	6,070	Asphalt
- Sources: GCM

Juan Vicente Gómez International Airport (IATA: SVZ, ICAO: SVSA), is an airport serving San Antonio del Táchira, in the Táchira state of Venezuela. In June 1993, it was renamed after the early Venezuelan President Juan Vicente Gómez, who was from Táchira, in a ceremony presided over by interim President Ramón José Velásquez.

== Airlines and destinations ==
Airlines	Destinations
Aerolíneas Estelar	Caracas, Porlamar
Conviasa	Barquisimeto, Caracas, Valencia (VE)
RUTACA Airlines	Barquisimeto, Caracas, Valencia (VE)
Turpial Airlines	Valencia (VE)

== See also ==
- Transport in Venezuela
- List of airports in Venezuela
