= Cacique Aramare Airport =

Cacique Aramare Airport Casique Aramare Airport
- IATA: PYH; ICAO: SVPA

Summary
- Airport type: Public
- Operator: Government
- Location: Puerto Ayacucho, Venezuela
- Elevation AMSL: 236 ft / 72 m
- Coordinates: 5°37′10″N 67°36′25″W

Map
- Location of the airport in Venezuela

Runways
Direction	Length		Surface
Direction	m	ft	Surface
04/22	2,520	8,268	Asphalt
- Source: WAD GCM Google Maps

Cacique Aramare Airport (Spanish: Aeropuerto Cacique Aramare) (IATA: PYH, ICAO: SVPA) is an airport serving Puerto Ayacucho, the capital of the Amazonas state in Venezuela. The airport and city are on the Orinoco River, locally the border between Venezuela and Colombia.

The Puerto Ayacucho VOR (Ident: PAY) and Puerto Ayacucho non-directional beacon (Ident: PAY) are located on the field.

== Airlines and destinations ==
Airlines	Destinations
Conviasa	Caracas

== See also ==
- Transport in Venezuela
- List of airports in Venezuela
