= José Leonardo Chirino =

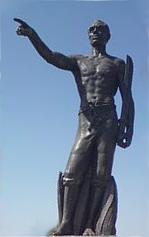
Statue of José Leonardo Chirino in Coro.

José Leonardo Chirino (April 25, 1754 – December 10, 1796) was a free zambo who helped to lead a 1795 uprising in Santa Ana de Coro, Venezuela. José Leonardo Chirino Airport is named after him.

== 1795 rebellion ==
1795 was perhaps the most revolutionary year in Caribbean history, with rebellions in Grenada, Saint Lucia, Saint Vincent, Curaçao, Dominica, Guyana, Trinidad, Jamaica, and the unfolding Haitian Revolution, the precursor which started in 1791 .

The Coro rebellion grew out of and contributed to this revolutionary conjuncture, especially under the leadership of Chirino, who had recently traveled to Saint-Domingue and heard news of the rebellion there as well as the more-distant French Revolution, and also the leadership of José Caridad González, a Congolese man who had studied the philosophy, strategy, and tactics of the unfolding French Revolution.

The Coro rebellion had four primary objectives:

- First, the application of the new legal system of the French Revolution, i.e. the abolition of monarchy and colonialism and the constitution of an independent, democratic republic.
- Second, the freedom of all enslaved Africans and the abolition of slavery.
- Third, the abolition of tribute payments that had been imposed upon the colony's indigenous population under Spanish rule.
- Fourth, the abolition of white supremacy, or privilege and prejudice on the basis of skin color.

== Betrayal and execution ==
After the rebellion was suppressed, Chirino was betrayed by an associate, captured and condemned to death. His children were sold into slavery. He was executed on December 10, 1796.
