= Barinas Airport =

Luisa Cáceres de Arismendi Airport Aeropuerto de Barinas
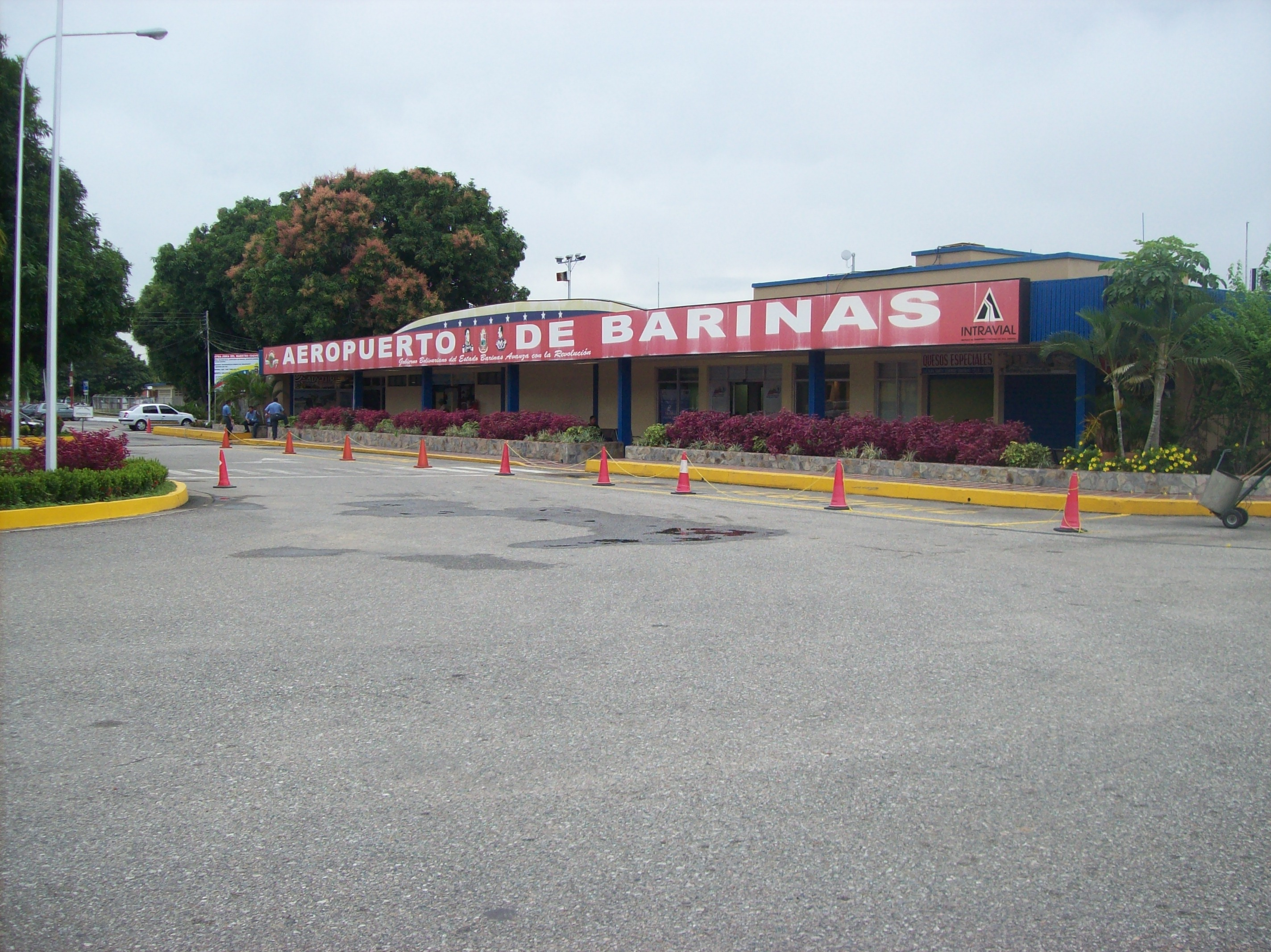
- IATA: BNS; ICAO: SVBI

Summary
- Airport type: Public
- Operator: Government
- Serves: Barinas, Venezuela
- Elevation AMSL: 666 ft (203 m)
- Coordinates: 8°37′10″N 70°13′15″W

Map
- Location of the airport in Venezuela

Runways
Direction	Length		Surface
Direction	m	ft	Surface
13/31	2,000	6,562	Asphalt
04/22	1,200	3,937	Asphalt
- Source: WAD GCM

Barinas Airport (Spanish: Aeropuerto de Barinas) (IATA: BNS, ICAO: SVBI) is an airport serving Barinas, the capital of the Venezuelan state of Barinas.

== Airlines and destinations ==
Airlines	Destinations
Aerolineas Estelar	Caracas
Conviasa	Caracas, Porlamar

== See also ==
- Transport in Venezuela
- List of airports in Venezuela
