= Santa Elena de Uairén Airport =

Santa Elena de Uairén Airport Aeropuerto de Santa Elena de Uairén
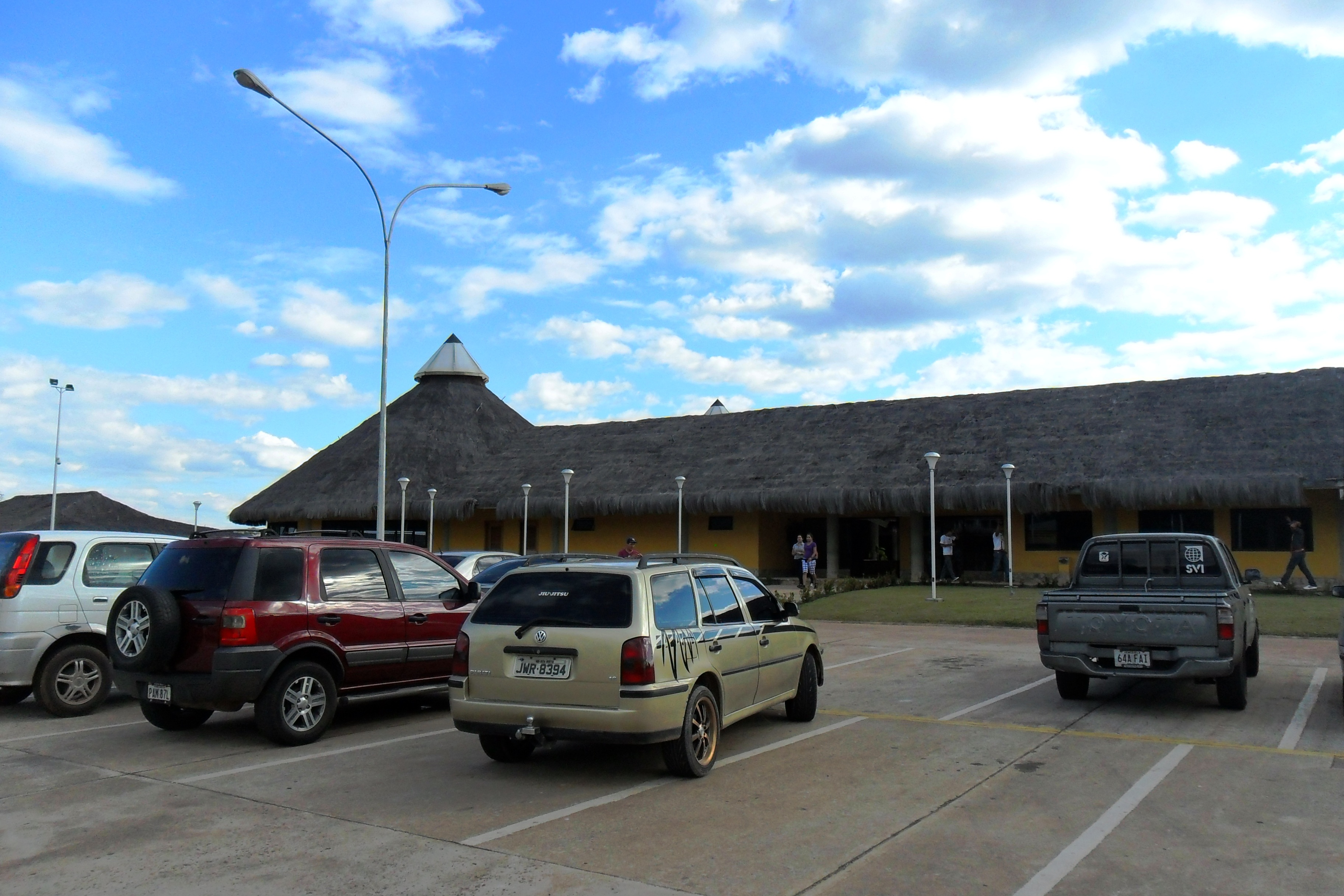
- IATA: SNV; ICAO: SVSE

Summary
- Airport type: Public
- Operator: Government
- Serves: Santa Elena de Uairén, Venezuela
- Elevation AMSL: 2,939 ft (896 m)
- Coordinates: 4°33′15″N 061°08′35″W

Map
- Location of airport in Venezuela

Runways
Direction	Length		Surface
Direction	m	ft	Surface
11/29	1,650	5,413	Asphalt
- Source: WAD GCM Google Maps

Santa Elena de Uairén Airport (Spanish: Aeropuerto de Santa Elena de Uairén) (IATA: SNV, ICAO: SVSE) is an airport serving Santa Elena de Uairén, a city in the Venezuelan state of Bolívar. The runway is 6.5 kilometres (4.0 mi) south of the city, and 6 kilometres (3.7 mi) from the Brazilian border.

The airport was under renovation in 2008 and it was re-opened on 29 April 2009 by Venezuelan President Hugo Chavez.

== Airlines and destinations ==
Airlines	Destinations
Conviasa	Canaima, Ciudad Guayana

== See also ==
- Transport in Venezuela
- List of airports in Venezuela
