= San Rafael Airport (Venezuela) =

San Rafael Airport Tucupita Airport
- IATA: TUV; ICAO: SVTC

Summary
- Airport type: Public
- Location: Tucupita, Venezuela
- Elevation AMSL: 16 ft (4.9 m)
- Coordinates: 9°05′20″N 62°05′40″W

Map
- Location of airport in Venezuela

Runways
Direction	Length		Surface
Direction	m	ft	Surface
08/26	1,700	5,577	Asphalt
- Sources: WAD GCM Google Maps

San Rafael Airport or Tucupita Airport (IATA: TUV, ICAO: SVTC) is an airport serving Tucupita, the capital city of the state of Delta Amacuro in Venezuela.

The Tucupita non-directional beacon (Ident: TUC) is located on the field.

The runway is at the western end of Tucupita. Final approach to Runway 08 crosses the Caño Manamo River.

== Airlines and destinations ==
Airlines	Destinations
Conviasa	Maturín

== See also ==
- Transport in Venezuela
- List of airports in Venezuela
