= Tocumen International Airport =

Airport serving Panama City, Panama

Tocumen International Airport Aeropuerto Internacional de Tocumen

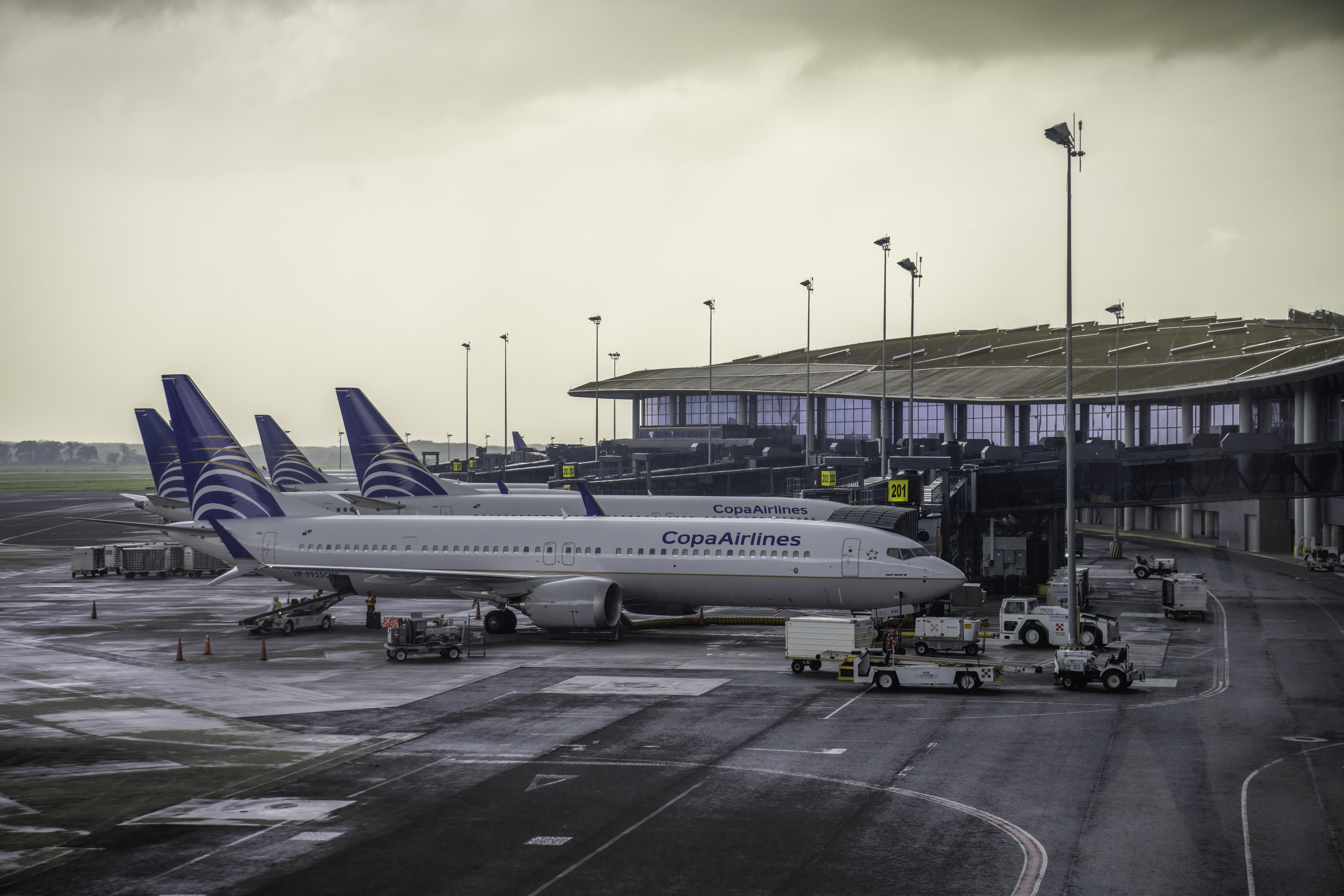
- Copa Airlines aircraft at the airport in 2023
- IATA: PTY; ICAO: MPTO; FAA LID: PTY

Summary
- Airport type: Public
- Operator: Tocumen S.A.
- Serves: Panama City, Panama
- Location: Tocumen
- Opened: 1 June 1947; 79 years ago
- Hub for: Copa Airlines; Copa Airlines Colombia; DHL Aero Expreso; Uniworld Air Cargo
- Elevation AMSL: 135 ft (41 m)
- Coordinates: 9°04′17″N 79°23′01″W
- Website: tocumenaero.com

Map
- Location in Panama

Runways
Direction	Length		Surface
Direction	m	ft	Surface
03L/21R	2,682	8,799	Asphalt
03R/21L	3,050	10,007	Concrete

Statistics (2024)
- Passengers: 19,250,384
- Movements: 152,813
- Source: WAD STV GCM

Tocumen International Airport (Spanish: Aeropuerto Internacional de Tocumen) (IATA: PTY, ICAO: MPTO) is the primary international airport serving Panama City, the capital of Panama. The airport serves as the hub for Copa Airlines and is a regional hub to and from the Caribbean, South, North and Central America and additionally features routes to some European cities as well as cargo flights to Qatar.

== History ==
After nine years, the original name was reestablished after the fall of the dictatorship of Panama by the U.S. invasion of 1989, when the airport was seized by 82nd Airborne Division paratroopers. The original runway (03L/21R) is mainly used for cargo and private flights, but also as a supplement to the primary runway during peak traffic periods. The main runway (03R/21L) is 3,050 m × 45 m (10,007 ft × 148 ft) and is used primarily for commercial flights, the 03R direction is ILS Cat. I enabled. Until 31 May 2003, Tocumen International Airport was managed by the Civil Aeronautics Directorate (which is known today as the Civil Aeronautics Authority). On 1 June of that year, an innovative terminal management platform was created through Law No. 23 for 29 January 2003, which set out a regulatory framework for the management of airports and landing strips in Panama. This law allowed the creation of Aeropuerto Internacional de Tocumen, S.A., also referred to as Tocumen, S.A., which currently manages the terminal. This law is one of a number of laws that restructured the aeronautical sector in Panama to further its improvement and modernization.

In August 2015, it was announced that Emirates would operate flights to Tocumen International Airport from Dubai starting in February 2016, at which point it would have become the world's longest non-stop flight. In January 2016, the route was delayed due to a lack of economic opportunities for the flight. It has not yet been announced when the flight will begin regularly scheduled operations.

On 16 March 2023, the Aeropuerto metro station of the Panama Metro opened at the airport.

== Expansion ==
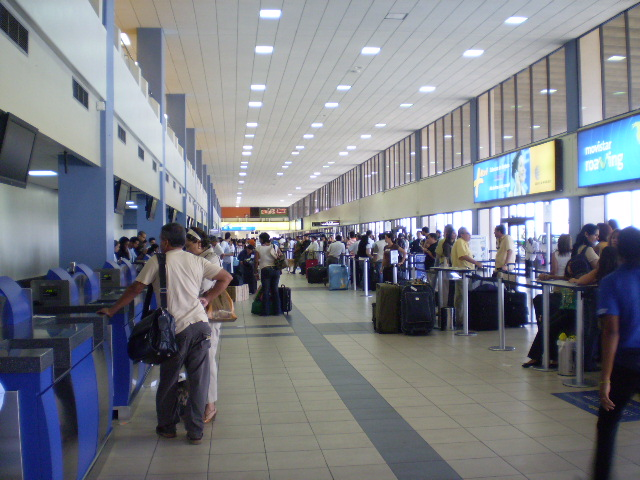
Terminal interior

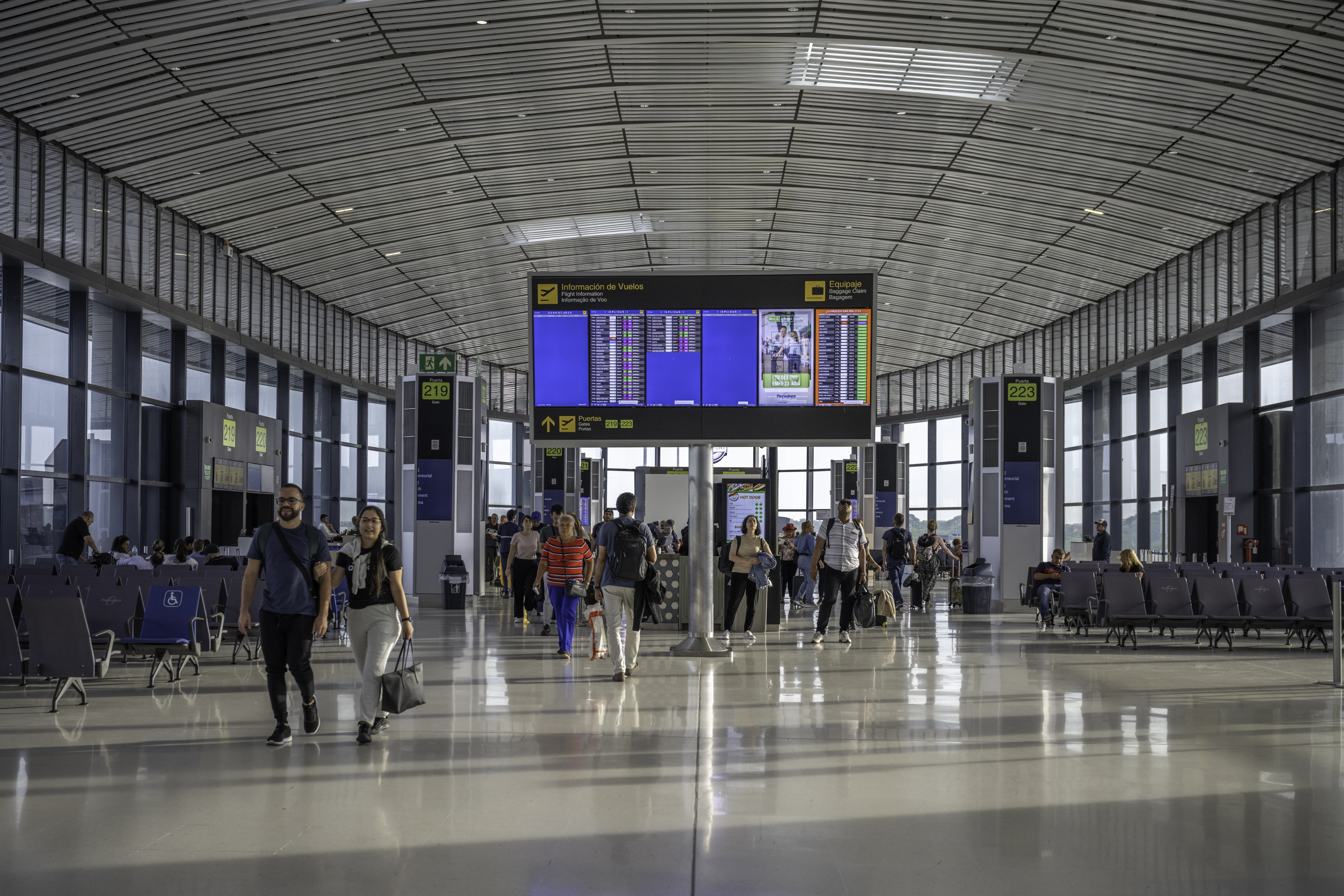
Terminal interior

In 2006, Tocumen S.A. started a major expansion and renovation program. The main passenger terminal was expanded 20,830 m^{2} (224,200 sq ft) at a cost of approximately US$21 million. New boarding gates were built to allow more flights to and from Panama, and to facilitate the growth of commercial and internal circulation areas. Tocumen Airport administration acquired 22 new boarding bridges and replaced the oldest 14. This included the addition of 6 remote positions, hence allowing Tocumen Airport to have a total of 28 boarding gates. The new installations were opened in 2006. The airport also has a VIP lounge, Copa Club, operated by the partnership between United Airlines and Copa Airlines that caters to Copa's partner airlines and Star Alliance members. It also had an Admirals Club for American Airlines, which closed on 30 June 2012. The Lounge Panama, a VIP airport lounge operated by Global Lounge Network started operations at Tocumen on 9 January 2019.

The renovation of the old Tocumen International Airport (originally built in 1947) to be used solely as a cargo terminal, was the last step of the modernization project of Tocumen International Airport. It included the redesign of the central building, the construction of new buildings for cargo companies among other improvements.

The South Terminal started a bidding process during the first half of 2012 and the contract was acquired by the Brazilian company Odebrecht. Tocumen S.A. made an investment of US$780 million, which included 20 additional gates. It included the construction of a new terminal, hundreds of parking spots, Tocumen river diversion, and four new direct-access lanes to the airport. The new terminal was officially inaugurated on 29 April 2019 and started operations on 22 June 2022.

== Airlines and destinations ==
The following airlines operate regular scheduled and charter flights at Tocumen International Airport:

Airlines	Destinations
Aerolíneas Estelar	Caracas
Aeroméxico	Mexico City–Benito Juárez
Air Europa	Madrid
Air France	Paris–Charles de Gaulle
American Airlines	Miami
Avianca	Bogotá
Avianca Costa Rica	San José (CR)
Avianca El Salvador	San Salvador
Cayman Airways	Grand Cayman
Copa Airlines	Aruba, Asunción, Atlanta, Austin, Barbados, Barquisimeto, Baltimore, Barranquilla, Belize City, Belo Horizonte–Confins, Bogotá, Boston, Brasília, Bucaramanga, Buenos Aires–Ezeiza, Cali, Cancún, Caracas, Cartagena, Chicago–O'Hare, Chiclayo, Córdoba (AR), Cúcuta, Curaçao, David (PA), Denver, Florianópolis, Fort Lauderdale, Georgetown–Cheddi Jagan, Guadalajara, Guatemala City, Guayaquil, Havana, Kingston–Norman Manley, Las Vegas, Lima, Los Angeles, Managua, Manaus, Manta, Maracaibo, Medellín–JMC, Mendoza (AR), Mexico City–Benito Juárez, Miami, Montego Bay, Monterrey, Montevideo, Montréal–Trudeau, Nassau, New York–JFK, Orlando, Paramaribo, Pereira, Porlamar (begins 26 November 2026), Porto Alegre, Port of Spain, Puerto Plata, Punta Cana, Quito, Raleigh/Durham, Rio de Janeiro–Galeão, Rosario, Salta, Salvador da Bahia, San Andrés (CO), San Diego, San Francisco, San José (CR), San José del Cabo, San Juan, San Pedro Sula, San Salvador, Santa Cruz de la Sierra–Viru Viru, Santa Marta, Santiago de Chile, Santiago de los Caballeros, Santo Domingo–Las Américas, São Paulo–Guarulhos, St Maarten, Tampa, Tegucigalpa, Toronto–Pearson, Valencia (VE), Tucumán, Washington–Dulles
Delta Air Lines	Atlanta
Iberia	Madrid
KLM	Amsterdam
RUTACA Airlines	Barquisimeto
Turkish Airlines	Istanbul
Turpial Airlines	Valencia (VE)
United Airlines	Houston–Intercontinental, Newark
Venezolana	Caracas
WestJet	Seasonal: Calgary

== Statistics ==
=== Annual traffic ===
Annual traffic
Year	Passengers	Passengers using ICAO methodology (2015)	% Change	% Change using ICAO methodology values (2015)	Cargo	% Change	Movements	% Change
2003	2,145,489		11.5%		85,508	-	43,980	-
2004	2,398,443		11.8%		96,215	12.5%	45,703	3.9%
2005	2,756,948		15%		103,132	19.6%	47,873	4.6%
2006	3,215,423		16.6%		82,186	-20.3%	53,853	12.7%
2007	3,805,312		18.3%		82,463	0.3%	61,400	14.0%
2008	4,549,170		19.5%		86,588.8	4.8%	73,621	19.9%
2009	4,748,621	6,531,927	4.4%		83,513	-3.8%	80,330	9.1%
2010	5,042,410	7,005,031	6.2%	7.2%	98,565	18.0%	84,113	4.7%
2011	5,844,561	8,271,459	15.9%	18.1%	110,946	12.6%	93,710	11.4%
2012	6,962,608	10,174,870	19.1%	23.0%	116,332	4.9%	110,206	17.6%
2013	7,784,328	11,586,681	11.8%	13.9%	110,186	-5.3%	121,356	10.1%
2014	8,536,342	12,782,167	9.7%	10.3%	110,789	0.5%	135,406	11.5%
2015	8,913,501	13,434,673	4.4%	5.1%	96,902	-12.5%	141,642	4.6%
2016		14,741,937		9.7%	110,364	13.9%	145,245	2.54%
2017		15,616,065		5.9%	113,228	2.59%	145,914	0.46%
2018		16,242,679		4.01%	168,108	48.47%	148,556	1.81%
2019		16,582,601		2.09%	164,700	-2.03%	149,808	1%
2020		4,526,663		-72.70%	145,929	-11.40%	50,976	65.97%
2021		9,163,998		102.44%	202,743	38.93%	88,823	74.24%
2022		15,779,103		72.18%	234,945	15.88%	133,084	49.83%
2023		17,825,465		12.97%	208,573	-11.22%	143,034	7.48%
2024		19,250,384		7.99%	216,653	3.87%	152,813	6.84%
2025		20,981,855		9.0%	248,455	12.8%	166,448	8.2%

=== Busiest routes ===
Busiest international routes out of Tocumen International Airport (2024)
Rank	City	Passengers	Airlines
1	Bogotá, Colombia	1,043,274	Avianca, Copa Airlines
2	Miami, United States	792,170	American Airlines, Copa Airlines
3	Medellín, Colombia	730,314	Avianca, Copa Airlines
4	San José, Costa Rica	692,042	Avianca, Copa Airlines
5	Punta Cana, Dominican Republic	669,396	Copa Airlines
6	Lima, Peru	628,689	Copa Airlines
7	Cancún, Mexico	595,357	Copa Airlines
8	São Paulo, Brazil	562,495	Copa Airlines
9	Guayaquil, Ecuador	555,155	Copa Airlines
10	Santiago, Chile	549,006	Copa Airlines

== Incidents and accidents ==
- On 4 August 1965, a Rutas Internacionales Peruanes SA (RIPSA), a Douglas DC-4 cargo flight, crashed after takeoff 2.5 mls NE of PTY because of faulty maintenance. All 7 occupants died.
- On 28 September 1979, a Transporte Aereo Boliviano (TAB) Lockheed C-130 Hercules crashed into the sea shortly after a night takeoff from PTY. All 4 occupants were killed.
- On 2 July 2004, an IAI Westwind operated by Air Tek crashed after takeoff and eventually came to rest inside an empty hangar. All 6 occupants were killed, along with an airport worker on the ground.

== See also ==
- Transport in Panama
- List of airports in Panama
