= Venezolana =

Venezuelan airline

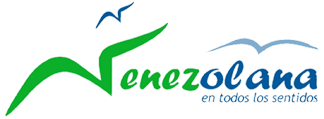

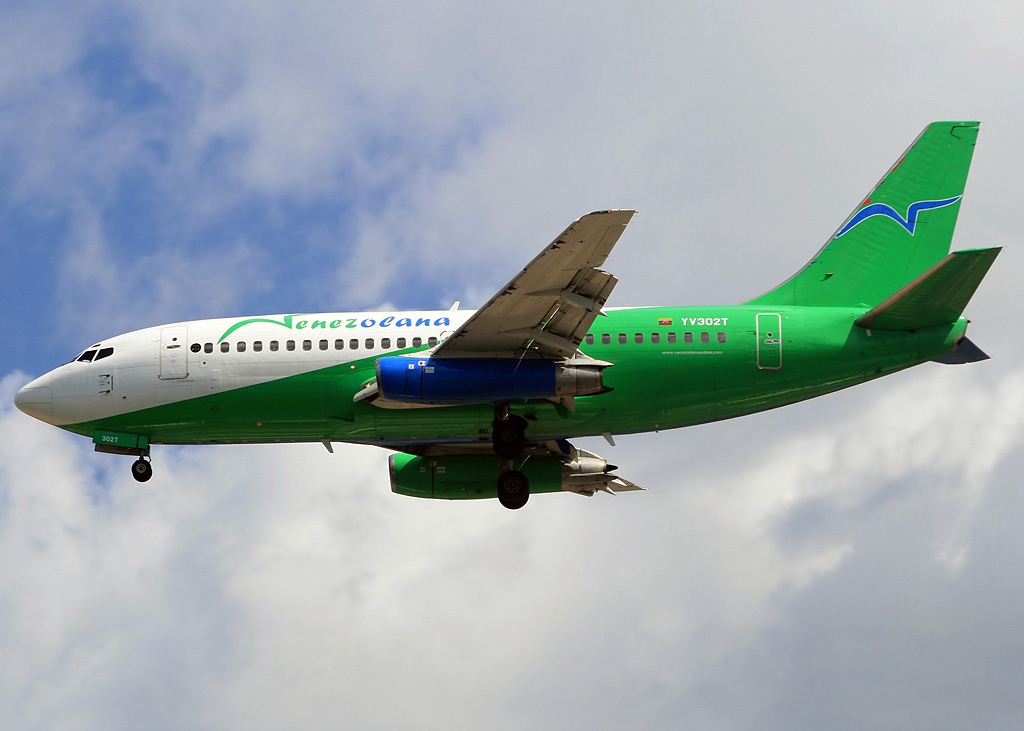
IATA	ICAO	Call sign
WW	VNE	VENEZOLANA
- Founded: June 6, 2001
- Hubs: La Chinita International Airport
- Secondary hubs: Simón Bolívar International Airport
- Fleet size: 1
- Destinations: 5
- Headquarters: Maracaibo, Venezuela
- Key people: Erwin Genie (President)
- Employees: ~1,040 (as of March 2014)
- Website: www.venezolana.aero

Venezolana - Rutas Aéreas de Venezuela S.A. is a charter airline headquartered in Maracaibo, Venezuela.

== History ==
The airline was established by Venezuelan investors on June 6, 2001 as RAVSA - Rutas Aéreas de Venezuela S.A. In late 2003 the airline began operating charter flights using Jetstream 31s under the brand name Venezolana. By January 2007, Venezolana began to acquire through the years a mixed fleet of used Boeing 737-200, MD-80s and Jetstream 41s to start more scheduled services to other destinations inside and outside of Venezuela. During the late 2000s, the airline experienced a rapid expansion in the international and domestic markets, especially with the regional route between the cities of Maracaibo and Caracas, which is one of the most popular routes in Venezuela.

However, Venezolana faced issues with its reputation in the international market between 2009 and 2011, following delays and cancellations due to mechanical problems, mismanagement in its operation procedures, and the ransacking of passengers' baggage. This led to the retirement of their Jetstream 41s and eventually brought criticism from passengers, and as a response, the airline reorganized its procedures and reduced complaints. On February 24, 2012, the Venezuelan Ministry of Transportation indefinitely suspended Venezolana's air operator certificate due to unpaid insurance premiums for its fleet, causing disruptions in its domestic and international operations. However, it was reported that the airline paid the premiums and resumed operations days later.

In January 2014, due to the Venezuelan government's CADIVI currency-exchange administration making delayed payments to domestic and international airlines, Venezolana had problems with its flights due to a lack of available aircraft since all but one of its aircraft were unairworthy due to the inability to buy replacement parts. Consequently, the National Institute of Civil Aviation decided to ground the airline again, causing disruptions in domestic and international operations indefinitely. In March 2014, the airline was bought by a group of private investors and resumed operations.

== Destinations ==
Venezolana flies to the following cities (as of September 2026):

Country	City	Airport	Notes	Refs
Colombia	Cali	Alfonso Bonilla Aragón International Airport		
Panama	Panama City	Tocumen International Airport		
Venezuela	Barquisimeto	Jacinto Lara International Airport		
Venezuela	Caracas	Simón Bolívar International Airport	Hub	
Venezuela	Maracaibo	La Chinita International Airport	Hub	
Venezuela	Porlamar	Santiago Mariño Caribbean International Airport		

== Accidents and incidents ==
- On November 18, 2004, a BAe Jetstream 31 (registered YV-1083C) was on a passenger flight when it crashed during a runway excursion at Simón Bolívar International Airport, where the runway was wet due to rain. Of the 21 occupants on board, only 2 people were killed. The aircraft was written off and scrapped.
- On April 27, 2009, a Boeing 737-200 (registered YV268T) suffered hydraulic problems causing the crew to burn off fuel in a holding pattern and landed back at La Chinita International Airport. None of the 84 occupants were injured while the aircraft was repaired and returned to service.
- On May 30, 2019, a Boeing 737-200 (registered YV502T) was flying from Port of Spain to Caracas when the aircraft suffered an engine failure and a subsequent uncontained engine fire. There were no reports of injuries to any of the 80 passengers on board the plane.

== See also ==
- List of airlines of Venezuela
