= Arturo Michelena International Airport =

Arturo Michelena International Airport Aeropuerto Internacional Arturo Michelena
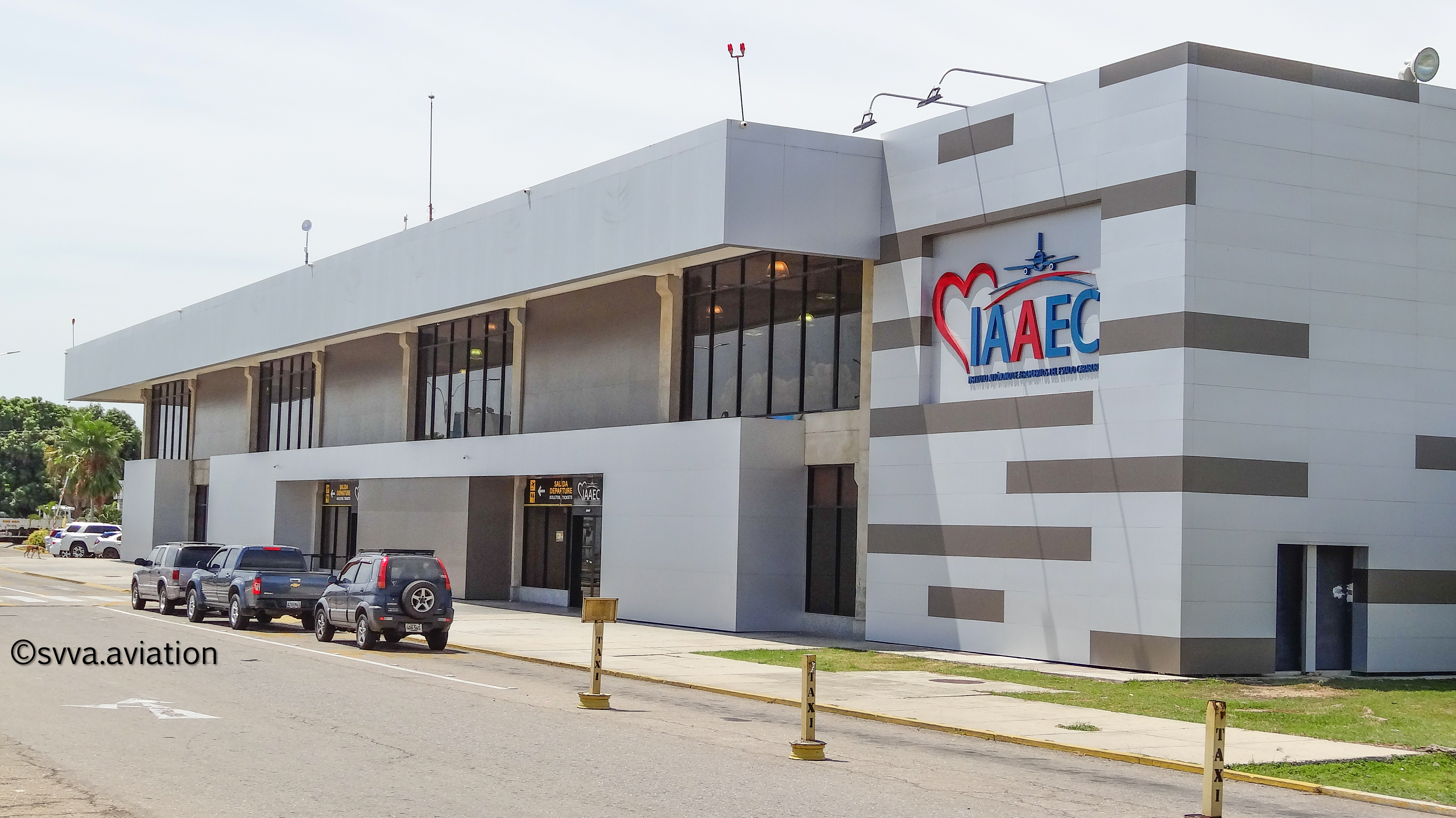
- IATA: VLN; ICAO: SVVA

Summary
- Airport type: Public
- Location: Valencia, Carabobo
- Hub for: Turpial Airlines
- Elevation AMSL: 430 m (1,410 ft)
- Coordinates: 10°09′00″N 67°55′40″W
- Website: arturomichelenainternational.com

Map
- Location of the airport in Venezuela

Runways
Direction	Length		Surface
Direction	m	ft	Surface
10/28	3,000	9,843	Asphalt
- Sources: GCM Google Maps

Arturo Michelena International Airport (IATA: VLN, ICAO: SVVA) is an airport serving the city of Valencia in Venezuela. The airport was named after painter Arturo Michelena, who was born in Valencia. It is a hub for Turpial Airlines and was once a secondary hub for Avior Airlines.

== Airlines and destinations ==
=== Passenger ===
Airlines	Destinations
Air Century	Punta Cana, Santo Domingo
Aeropostal	Porlamar
Avianca	Bogotá
Conviasa	Porlamar, Puerto Ordaz, San Antonio del Táchira
Copa Airlines	Panama City–Tocumen
RUTACA Airlines	Caracas, Havana, Porlamar_{,} San Antonio del Táchira
Turpial Airlines	Bogotá, Maracaibo, Medellín–JMC, Panama City–Tocumen, Porlamar, Puerto Ordaz, San Antonio del Táchira
Wingo	Bogotá

== See also ==
- Transport in Venezuela
- List of airports in Venezuela
