= Santiago Mariño Caribbean International Airport =

Santiago Mariño Caribbean International Airport Del Caribe Santiago Mariño International Airport
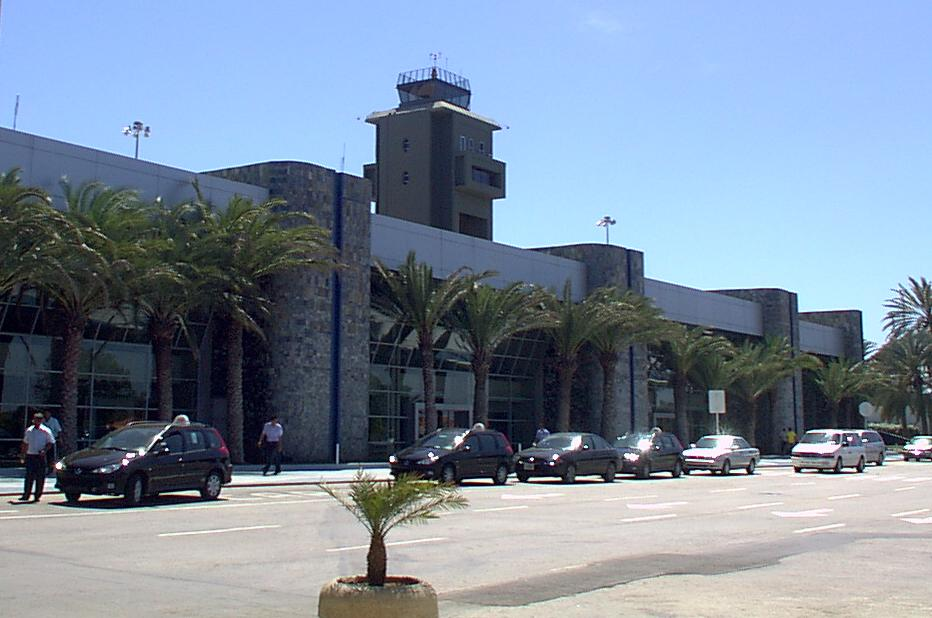
- IATA: PMV; ICAO: SVMG

Summary
- Airport type: Public
- Operator: BAER Aeropuertos
- Serves: Porlamar
- Location: Isla Margarita, Venezuela
- Hub for: Conviasa; Sundance Air Venezuela
- Focus city for: LASER Airlines
- Elevation AMSL: 72 ft (22 m)
- Coordinates: 10°54′50″N 63°58′05″W

Map
- Location in Venezuela

Runways
Direction	Length		Surface
Direction	m	ft	Surface
09/27	3,180	10,433	Asphalt
09L/27R	2,935	9,629	Asphalt
- Sources: WAD GCM

Santiago Mariño Caribbean International Airport (Spanish: Aeropuerto Internacional del Caribe "Santiago Mariño", IATA: PMV, ICAO: SVMG) is an airport 12 kilometres (7.5 mi) west-southwest of Porlamar, the largest city on Isla Margarita, an island in the state of Nueva Esparta in Venezuela.

== History ==
According to the Official Airline Guide (OAG), the airport had scheduled passenger airline service from Europe and the U.S. during the early 1990s including nonstop flights from Frankfurt, London, Miami, Milan and New York City operated by VIASA. Additionally, several European and Canadian carriers, such as Condor, LTU (merged with Air Berlin in 2009), TUI Airways, TUI fly Netherlands, TUI fly Nordic, Martinair, Air Canada, and Air Transat, among others, had seasonal and charter services to Porlamar in the 1990s and 2000s.

Long-haul operations from the airport have since largely ended (except, as of 2023, for a Nordwind Airlines charter flight to Moscow), but short and medium haul international flight still exist as of today. From autumn 2023 LOT Polish Airlines operated charter flights from Warsaw and Katowice.

== Facilities ==
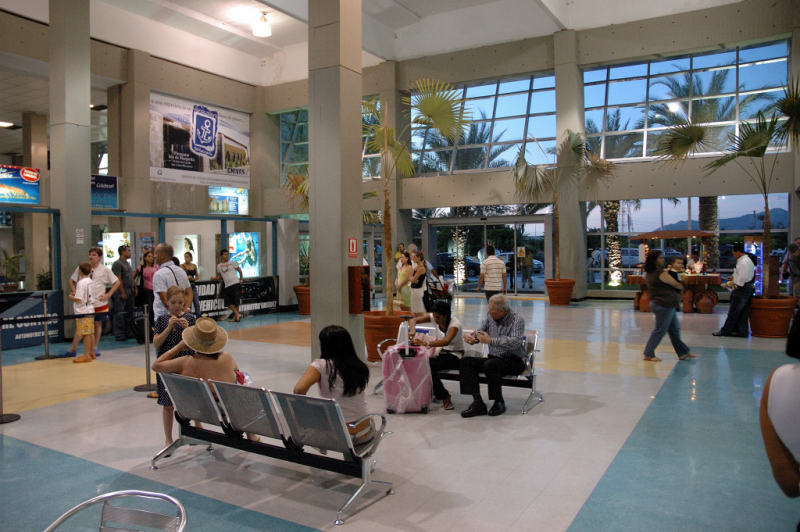
Terminal interior

The airport has one terminal, which is divided into international and domestic sections.

== Airlines and destinations ==
The followjng scheduled services which operate at the airport:

Airlines	Destinations
Aerolineas Estelar	Caracas, San Antonio del Táchira
Aeropostal	Maracaibo, Valencia (VE)
Avior Airlines	Caracas
Conviasa	Acarigua, Barbados,Barcelona (VE), Barinas, Barquisimeto, Caracas, El Vigía, La Fría, Maracaibo, Maturín, Puerto Ordaz, Santo Domingo del Táchira, Tucupita, Valencia (VE), Moscow-Vnukovo
Copa Airlines	Panama City–Tocumen (begins 26 November 2026)
LASER Airlines	Caracas, Puerto Ordaz
RUTACA Airlines	Barquisimeto, Caracas, Port of Spain, Puerto Ordaz, Valencia (VE)
Turpial Airlines	El Vigía, Valencia (VE)
Venezolana	Cali, Caracas
Wingo	Seasonal: Bogotá, Medellín–JMC

== See also ==
- Transport in Venezuela
- List of airports in Venezuela
