= Manuel Carlos Piar Guayana Airport =

Manuel Carlos Piar International Airport
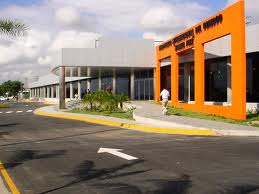
- IATA: PZO; ICAO: SVPR

Summary
- Airport type: Public
- Location: Ciudad Guayana, Venezuela
- Elevation AMSL: 472 ft (144 m)
- Coordinates: 8°17′20″N 62°45′35″W

Map
- Location of airport in Venezuela

Runways
Direction	Length		Surface
Direction	m	ft	Surface
08/26	2,050	6,726	Asphalt
- Sources: GCM Google Maps

Manuel Carlos Piar Guayana International Airport (IATA: PZO, ICAO: SVPR) (Spanish: Aeropuerto Internacional de Guayana "Manuel Carlos Piar") is an airport in the city of Ciudad Guayana, Venezuela. Ciudad Guayana is divided into two main population centres, San Félix and Puerto Ordaz, where the airport is located and hence its IATA code of CGU. The city sits at the confluence of the Orinoco and Caroni Rivers, and is the main access point for the natural attractions in south-east Venezuela, mainly Canaima National Park and Gran Sabana.

The airport is named after Manuel Piar, victorious general at the Battle of San Félix in the Venezuelan War of Independence.

Most of its current facilities and lay-out comes from the large renovation done in 2007, in preparation for the 2007 Copa América held in Venezuela.

The Guayana VORTAC (Ident: GNA) is located on the field. The Guayana non-directional beacon (Ident: GNA) is located 7.0 nautical miles (13.0 km) off the approach end of Runway 26.

== Airlines and destinations ==
Airlines	Destinations
Aerolineas Estelar	Caracas
Avior Airlines	Caracas
Conviasa	Canaima, Caracas, Maracaibo, Porlamar, Valencia (VE), Santa Elena de Urairén
LASER Airlines	Caracas, Porlamar
Turpial Airlines	Valencia (VE)
RUTACA Airlines	Caracas

== See also ==
- Transport in Venezuela
- List of airports in Venezuela
