= José Leonardo Chirino Airport =

José Leonardo Chirino International Airport
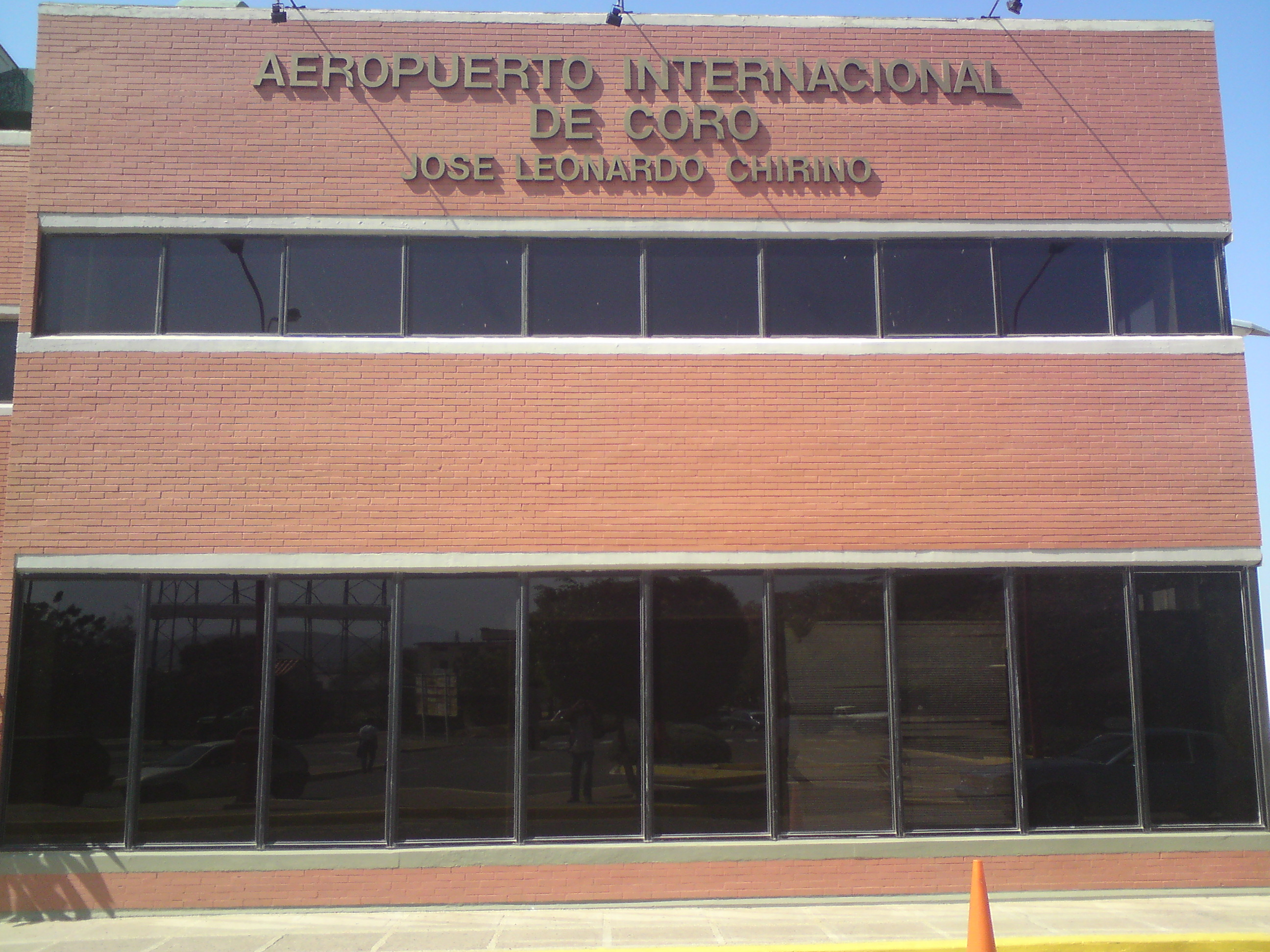
- IATA: CZE; ICAO: SVCR

Summary
- Airport type: Public
- Location: Santa Ana de Coro, Venezuela
- Elevation AMSL: 52 ft / 16 m
- Coordinates: 11°24′55″N 069°40′50″W

Map
- Location of the airport in Venezuela

Runways
Direction	Length		Surface
Direction	m	ft	Surface
09/27	2,060	6,759	Asphalt
- Sources: GCM

José Leonardo Chirino Airport (IATA: CZE, ICAO: SVCR) is an airport serving Coro, the capital of Falcón state in Venezuela. It is named to honor José Leonardo Chirino, leader of a 1795 rebellion in Coro that called for the abolition of slavery and the establishment of a democratic republic.

== See also ==
- Transport in Venezuela
- List of airports in Venezuela
