= Turpial Airlines =

Venezuelan airline

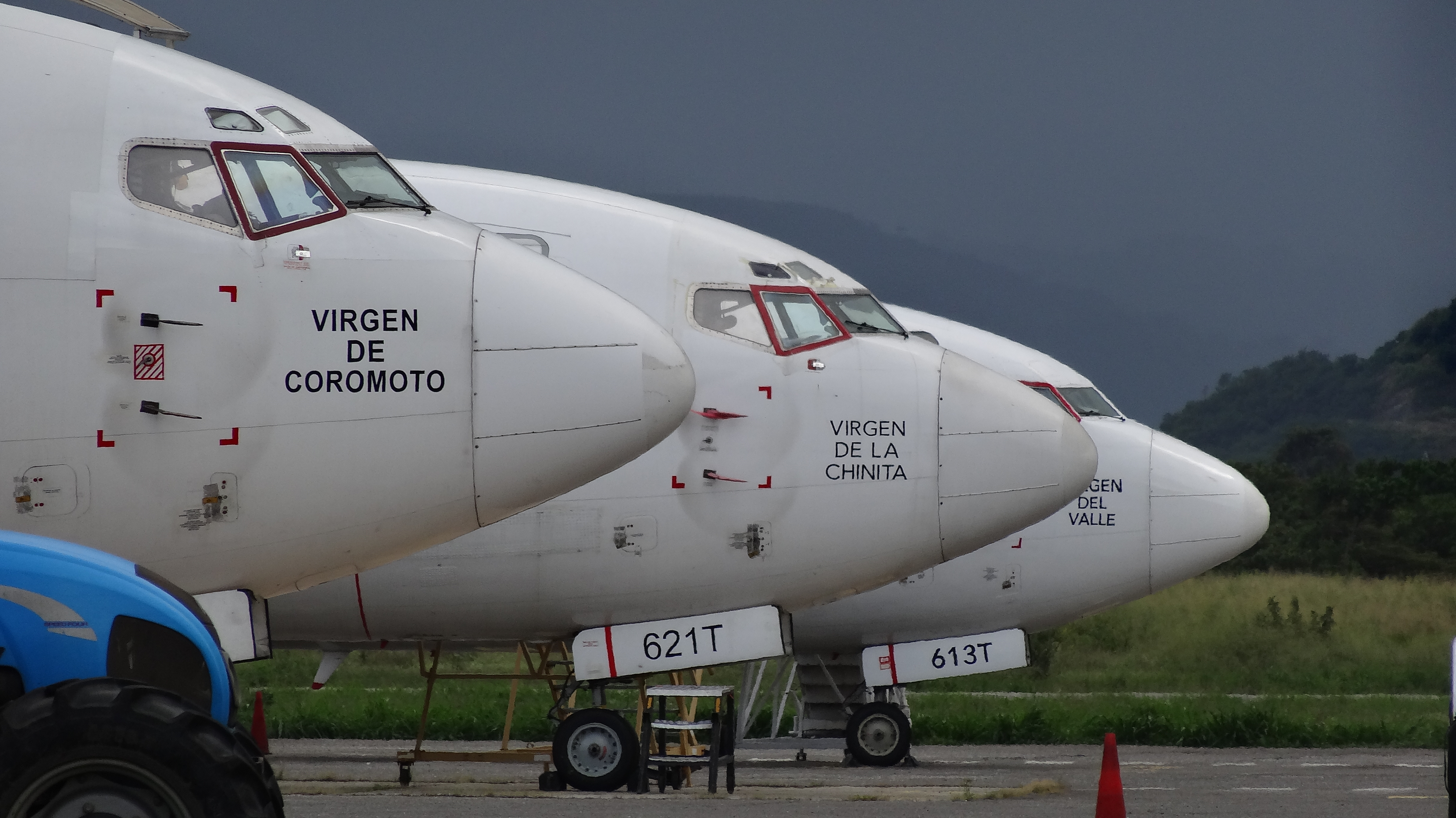
IATA	ICAO	Call sign
T9	VTU	TURPIAL
- Founded: March 15, 2016
- Commenced operations: April 7, 2017
- Hubs: Arturo Michelena International Airport
- Fleet size: 3
- Destinations: 12
- Headquarters: Valencia, Venezuela
- Website: www.turpialairlines.com

Turpial Airlines C.A. is a Venezuelan airline that has its hub at Arturo Michelena International Airport in Valencia, Venezuela. This airline has a fleet of 3 Boeing 737-400 authorized to operate regular and non-regular flights of passengers, cargo, and mail within the nation and internationally.

== History ==
Former logo of this airline until 2017.

Turpial Airlines was founded on March 15, 2016, beginning its operations on April 7, 2017, with national routes that include Valencia, Maracaibo, and Porlamar, additionally with Panama City being its first international destination.

== Destinations ==
As of January 2026, Turpial operates services to the following destinations:

Country	City	Airport	Notes	Refs
Colombia	Bogotá	El Dorado International Airport		
Cuba	Holguín	Frank País Airport	Charter	
Cuba	Havana	José Martí International Airport	Charter	
Dominican Republic	Punta Cana	Punta Cana International Airport	Terminated	
Dominican Republic	Santo Domingo	Las Américas International Airport	Suspended	
Mexico	Cancún	Cancún International Airport	Terminated	
Panama	Panama City	Tocumen International Airport		
Venezuela	Barcelona	General José Antonio Anzoátegui International Airport		
Venezuela	Caracas	Simón Bolívar International Airport		
Venezuela	Maracaibo	La Chinita International Airport		
Venezuela	Porlamar	Santiago Mariño Caribbean International Airport		
Venezuela	Puerto Ordaz	Manuel Carlos Piar Guayana Airport		
Venezuela	Santo Domingo	Mayor Buenaventura Vivas Airport		
Venezuela	Valencia	Arturo Michelena International Airport	Hub	

== Fleet ==
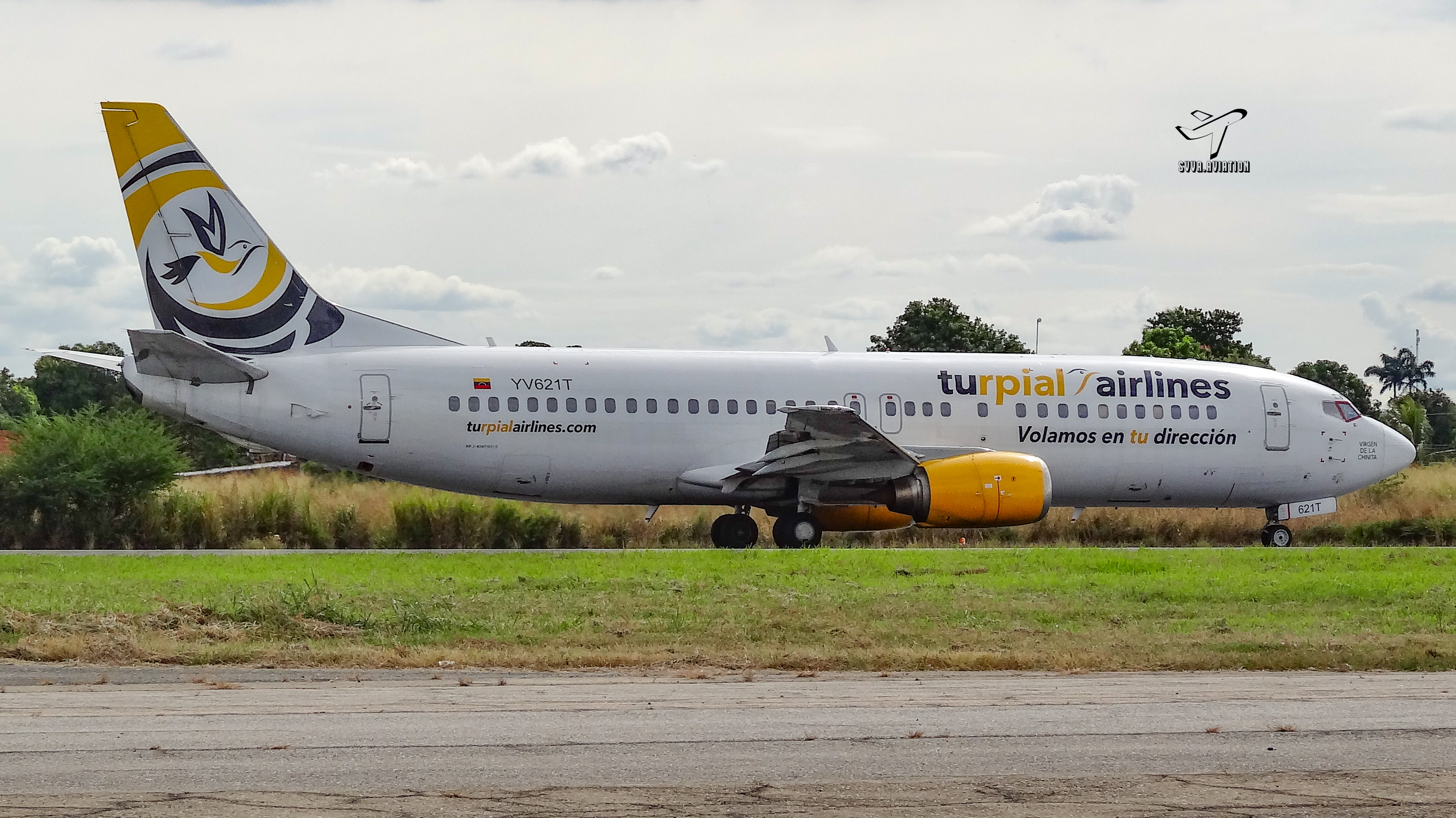
Turpial Airlines Boeing 737-400

Turpial Airlines includes the following aircraft as of February 2026:

Turpial Airlines fleet
Aircraft	In service	Orders	Passengers			Notes
Aircraft	In service	Orders	C	Y	Total	Notes
Boeing 737-400	3	—	12	134	144	
Boeing 737-400	3	—	–	156	156	
Boeing 737-400	3	—	–	158	158	
Total	3	—				

== See also ==
- List of airlines of Venezuela
