= Zuliana de Aviación =

Venezuelan airline

IATA	ICAO	Call sign
OD	ULA	ZULIANA
- Founded: 1985
- Ceased operations: April 1997
- Hubs: La Chinita International Airport
- Fleet size: 8
- Destinations: 12
- Headquarters: Maracaibo, Venezuela
- Key people: Julio César Álvare (CEO)

Zuliana de Aviación C.A. was a Venezuelan airline. It initially began as a cargo airline in 1985 based in Maracaibo, but later began service as a passenger carrier. Its name was derived from the Venezuelan state of Zulia. The airline ceased operations in April 1997.

== Destinations ==
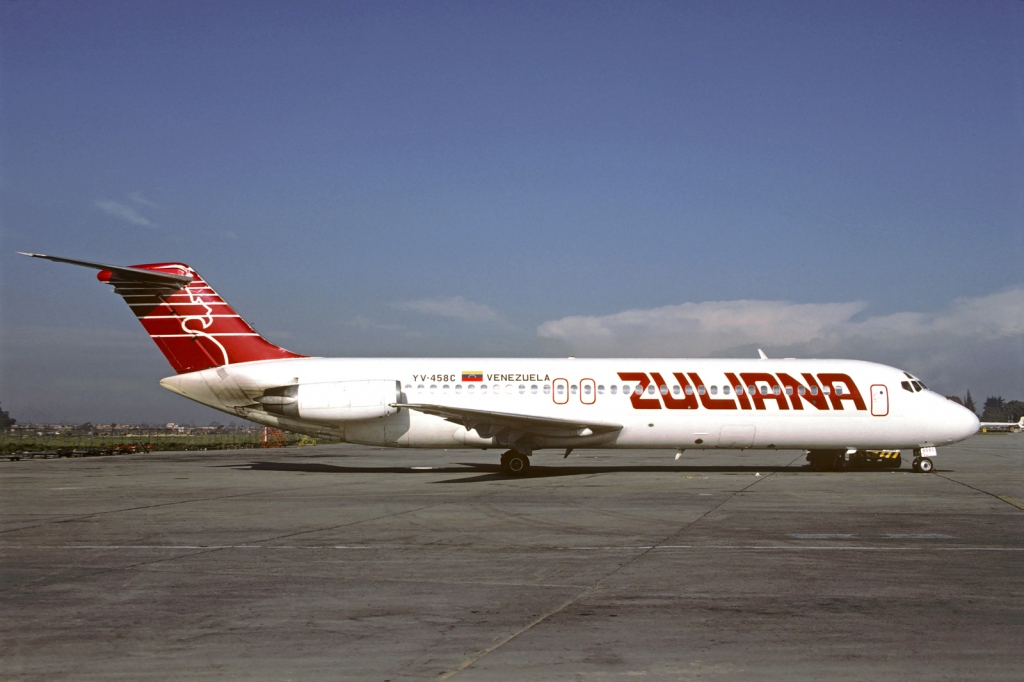
A Zuliana de Aviación McDonnell Douglas DC-9-31 at El Dorado International Airport in 1996

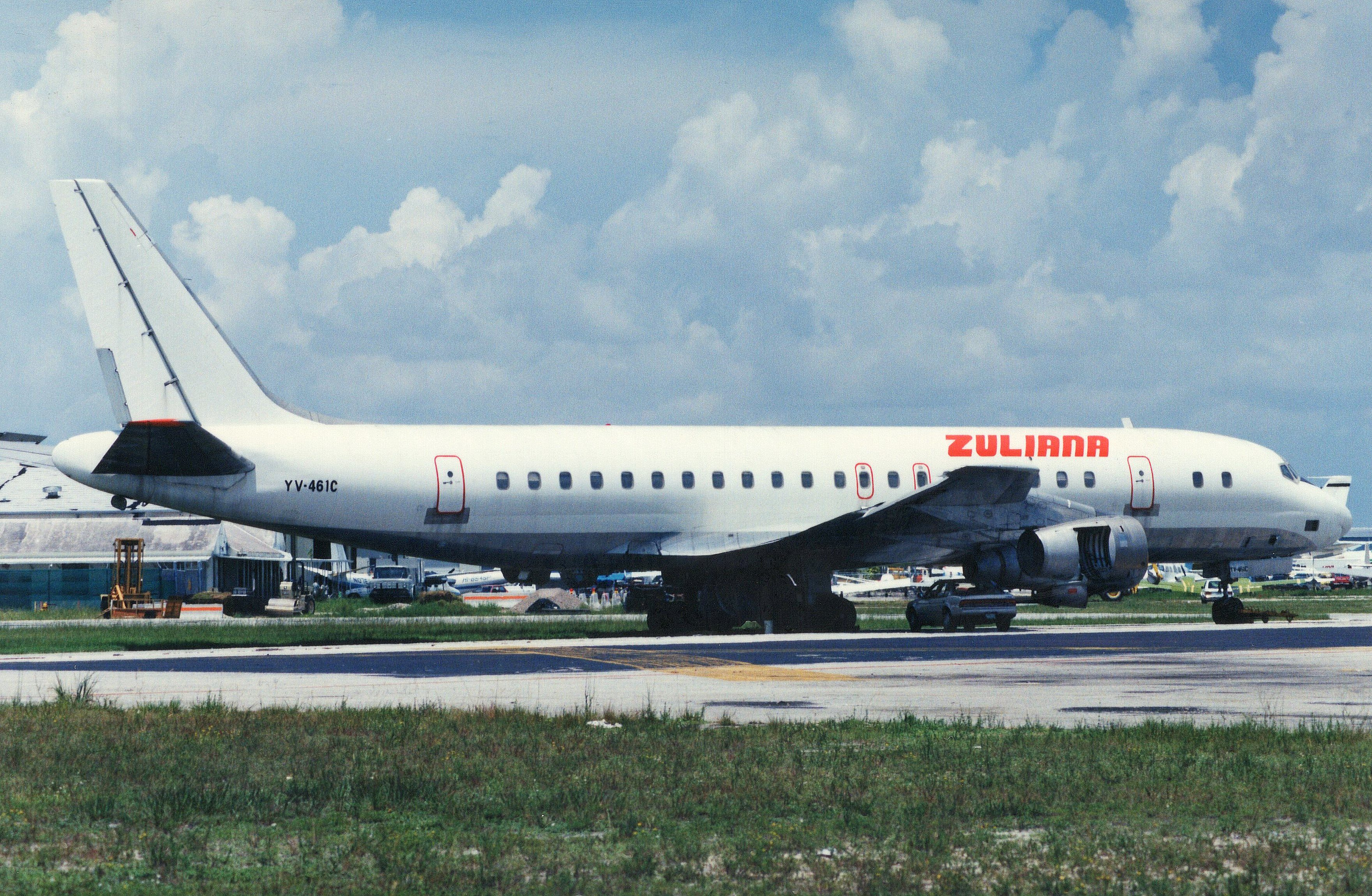
Zuliana de Aviación Douglas DC-8-51F at Miami Airport, 1995

- Colombia
  - Bogotá (El Dorado International Airport)
  - Medellín (José María Córdova International Airport)
- United States
  - Miami (Miami International Airport)
- Venezuela
  - Barcelona (General José Antonio Anzoátegui International Airport)
  - Caracas (Simón Bolívar International Airport)
  - Las Piedras (Josefa Camejo International Airport)
  - Maracaibo (La Chinita International Airport) Hub
  - Porlamar (Santiago Mariño Caribbean International Airport)
  - Puerto Ordaz (Manuel Carlos Piar Guayana Airport)
  - San Antonio del Táchira (Juan Vicente Gómez International Airport)
  - Santa Barbara del Zulia (Miguel Urdaneta Fernández Airport)
  - Valencia (Arturo Michelena International Airport)

== Fleet ==
Zuliana de Aviación had formerly operated the following aircraft:

- 5 Boeing 727-200
- 1 Douglas DC-8-51F
- 2 Douglas DC-8-54CF
- 2 McDonnell Douglas DC-9-31
- 3 McDonnell Douglas DC-9-32

== See also ==
- List of defunct airlines of Venezuela
