= RUTACA Airlines Flight 225 =

2001 aviation accident

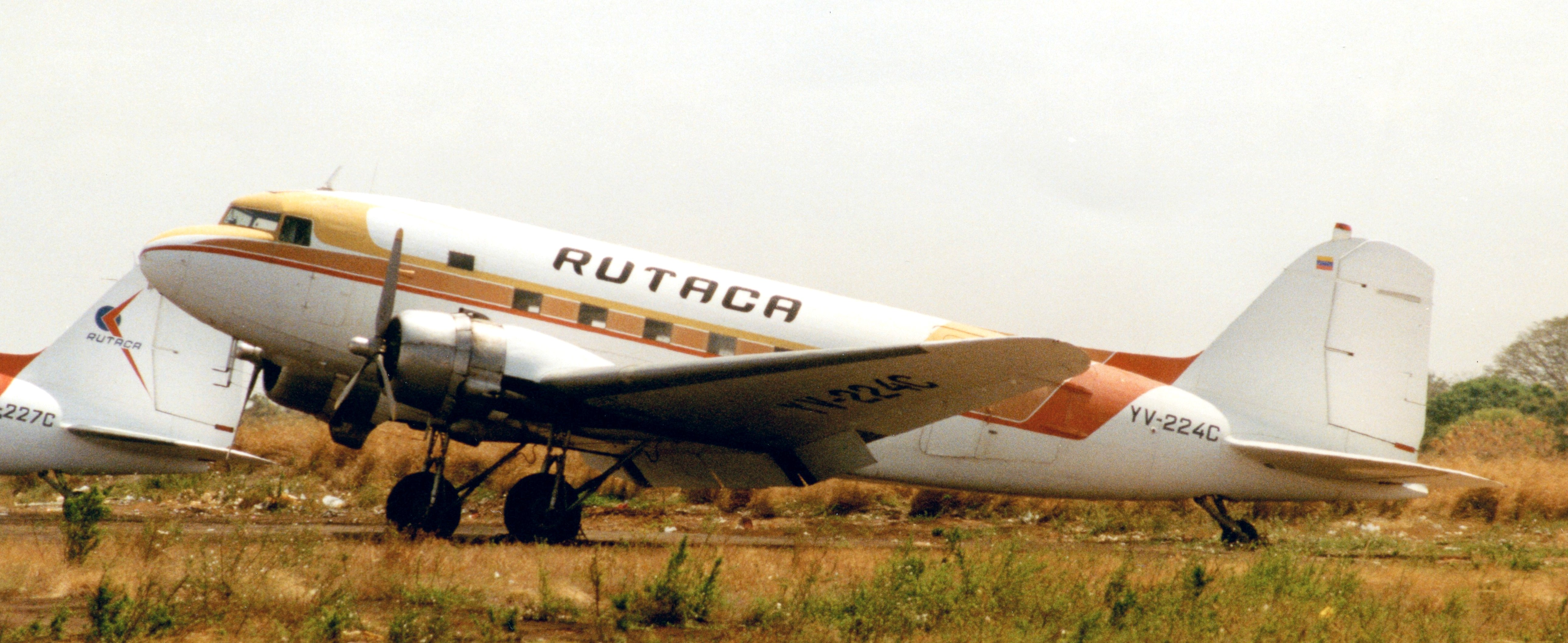
- YV-224C, the aircraft involved in the accident

Accident
- Date: 25 January 2001
- Summary: Engine failure leading to loss of control
- Site: Abobo shantytown, Ciudad Bolívar, Venezuela
- Total fatalities: 25
- Total injuries: 3

Aircraft
- Aircraft type: Douglas C-47A
- Operator: RUTACA Airlines
- Registration: YV-224C
- Flight origin: Canaima Airport, Canaima, Venezuela
- Stopover: Tomás de Heres Airport, Ciudad Bolívar, Venezuela
- Destination: Santiago Mariño Caribbean International Airport, Porlamar, Isla Margarita, Venezuela
- Passengers: 20?
- Crew: 4?
- Fatalities: 24?
- Injuries: 0
- Survivors: 0

Ground casualties
- Ground fatalities: 1
- Ground injuries: 3

RUTACA Airlines Flight 225 (5R225/RUC225) was a domestic tourist passenger flight, operated by RUTACA Airlines from Canaima Airport to Santiago Mariño Caribbean International Airport that crashed during a refueling stop in Tomás de Heres Airport in Ciudad Bolívar, Venezuela on 25 January 2001. The aircraft was carrying 24 passengers and crew members. The aircraft, a Douglas C-47A, crashed into a shantytown shortly after takeoff from Ciudad Bolívar, killing everyone on board. Eyewitnesses stated that an engine failure had occurred.

== Flight ==
The flight took off from Canaima Airport in Canaima to the Caribbean Island of Isla Margarita with a refueling stop in Ciudad Bolívar. The aircraft was carrying 20 passengers and 4 crew members, piloted by Captain Ángel López and co-piloted by Captain Walter Manríquez.

Shortly after takeoff from Tomás de Heres Airport, the aircraft suddenly lost altitude and the crew attempted to return to the airport. Witnesses recalled that one engine appeared to be on fire. The aircraft crashed into a large tree and exploded on impact with debris raining down on the shantytown of Abobo. One of the wings detached and crashed onto homes. All 20 passengers and 4 crew members were killed. Firefighters and rescue services were immediately deployed. At least 3 people were injured, identified as a mother and two of her children, whose all suffered 80% burns to their bodies. One person on the ground was killed.

== Aircraft ==
The aircraft was a Douglas C-47A manufactured in 1943, which was initially operated for the USAF. It was then sold to the Brazilian Air Force, was in service with the Air Force until 1975, when it was sold to Rico Linhas Aereas, re-registered as PT-KXR. In 1983 it was bought by RUTACA Airlines and was re-registered as YV-224C.

== Passengers and crew ==
The aircraft was carrying 20 passengers and 4 crew members. Most of the 20 passengers on board were European tourists, according to Venezuela's Air Rescue Service. The government released a list of nationalities of the victims on board. There were five Dutch, four Italians, two Hungarians, two Venezuelans and one Austrian. The list also confirmed three Americans and three Canadians on board. All four crew members were Venezuelans.

People on board by nationality
Country	Persons
Austria	1
Canada	3
Hungary	2
Italy	4
Netherlands	5
United States of America	3
Venezuela	6
Total	24

The pilot of the flight was identified as Captain Ángel López and the co-pilot was identified as Captain Walter Manríquez. The Engineer of Flight 225 was identified as José Olivares.

== Investigation ==
An air traffic controller at the airport claimed that the pilot of the aircraft had requested for a return to base, but he did not say why and did not announce an emergency. During its attempt, it crashed onto the shantytown. Locals stated that an engine of the plane was on fire, which raised a question on the condition of the engine. According to the brother of the pilot on board, the pilot had complained in recent weeks that he had made at least four emergency landings because of engine trouble with the aircraft. However, the President of RUTACA, Eugenio Molina, denied such claims, stating that the aircraft had a clean safety record since Rutaca first used it in 1977 and that there had been no recent forced landings.

The aircraft was not equipped with any flight recorders.

This incident marked the end of the C-47 era in Venezuela when the next day the INAC suspended DC-3 & C-47 operations in the country. They also ordered RUTACA Airlines to suspend its operations while the authorities performed a rigorous inspection of all its equipment and personnel, being delayed several weeks later. Near the crash site, a monument in honor of the victims, raised by order of the Government of the Bolivar State in 2005, was erected.

== See also ==
- Conviasa Flight 2350
