= Línea Aérea IAACA =

Venezuelan airline

IATA	ICAO	Call sign
KG	BNX	AIR BARINAS
- Founded: 1992
- Ceased operations: September 27, 2006
- Hubs: Barinas Airport
- Fleet size: 8
- Destinations: 13
- Headquarters: Barinas, Venezuela
- Key people: Arnaldo Bazzichelli (President)

LAI – Línea Aérea IAACA (legally Industria Aero Agrícola C.A.) was an airline based in Barinas, Venezuela.

== History ==
The airline was founded in 1992 as a cropdusting company. It later turned into an air taxi service. LAI became a regular airline in 1995.

The airline stopped operating on September 27, 2006, after financial problems. After the cessation, a group wanted to make an airline label to achieve and reach number one among passenger airlines, to connect the tourist destinations from and to Venezuela, with a modern fleet and high-tech equipment.

== Destinations ==
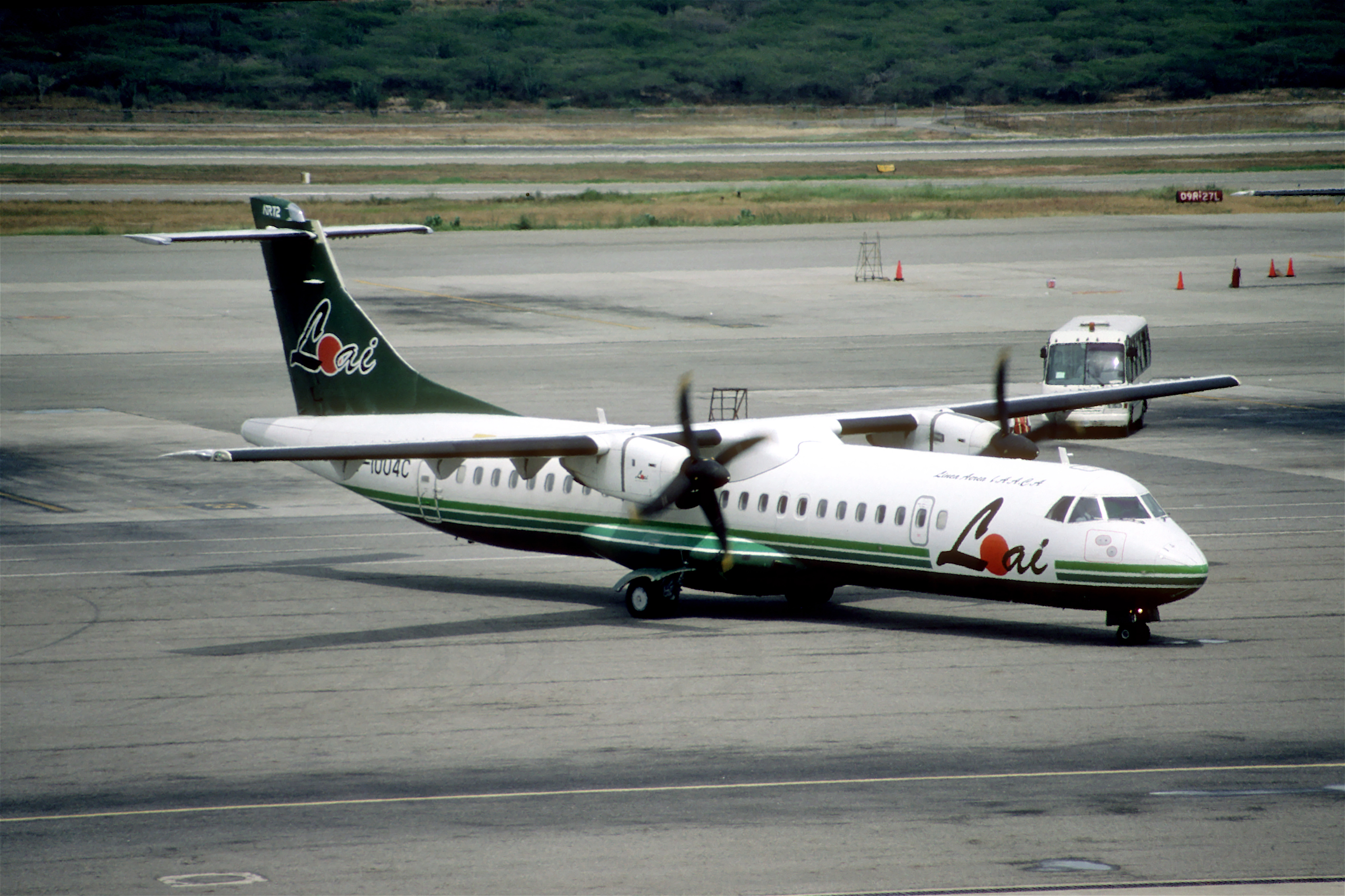
A LAI ATR 72-200 parked at Simón Bolívar International Airport in 2001

LAI operated to the following destinations:

- Venezuela
  - Acarigua (Oswaldo Guevara Mujica Airport)
  - Barcelona (General José Antonio Anzoátegui International Airport)
  - Barinas (Barinas Airport) Hub
  - Caracas (Simón Bolívar International Airport)
  - Carúpano (General José Francisco Bermúdez Airport)
  - Ciudad Bolívar (Tomás de Heres Airport)
  - Cumaná (Antonio José de Sucre Airport)
  - Guanare (Guanare Airport)
  - Güiria (Güiria Airport)
  - Maturín (José Tadeo Monagas International Airport)
  - Mérida (Alberto Carnevalli Airport)
  - Porlamar (Santiago Mariño Caribbean International Airport)
  - Valera (Antonio Nicolas Briceño Airport)

== Fleet ==
Linea Aerea IAACA included the following aircraft:

- 2 Beechcraft Model 18
- 2 ATR 42-300
- 1 ATR 42-320
- 3 ATR 72-200

== See also ==
- List of defunct airlines of Venezuela
