= List of airlines of Venezuela =

This is a list of airlines which have an air operator's certificate issued by the Civil Aviation Authority of Venezuela.

== Active ==
=== Scheduled airlines ===
| Airline | Image | IATA | ICAO | Callsign | Hub(s) | Founded | Notes |
|---|---|---|---|---|---|---|---|
| Aerocaribe | | CV | CVZ | CARIBE | Caracas | 2012 | |
| Aerolíneas Estelar | | ES | ETR | ESTELAR | Caracas | 2009 | |
| Aeropostal Alas de Venezuela | | CW | ALV | AEROPOSTAL | Caracas | 1929 | |
| Avior Airlines | | 9V | ROI | AVIOR | Barcelona (VE); Caracas | 1994 | |
| Conviasa | | V0 | VCV | CONVIASA | Caracas; Porlamar | 2004 | Flag carrier. |
| LASER Airlines | | QL | LER | LASER | Caracas; La Romana | 1993 | |
| RUTACA Airlines | | RU | RUC | RUTACA | Caracas | 1974 | |
| SASCA Airlines | | O3 | SSU | SASCA | Caracas; Porlamar | 1991 | |
| Turpial Airlines | | T9 | VTU | TURPIAL | Valencia (VE) | 2016 | |

=== Charter airlines ===
| Airline | Image | IATA | ICAO | Callsign | Hub(s) | Founded | Notes |
|---|---|---|---|---|---|---|---|
| Aeroparaguaná | | | | | Las Piedras | 2013 | Virtual airline. |
| Aerotecnica | | | DUG | ATSA | Caracas/Charallave | 1951 | Operations with smaller equipment. |
| Albatros Airlines | | G0 | GAL | ERRANTE | Maracay | 2007 | Temporarily suspended. |
| BlueStar Aviation | | | BSV | BLUESTARVEN | Los Roques | 2022 | |
| CIACA Airlines | | | CVX | CIACA | Ciudad Bolívar | 1999 | |
| Comeravia | | CW | NWT | COMERAVIA | Porlamar | 1965 | |
| Moraima Airlines | | | IMO | | Ciudad Bolívar | 2008 | |
| Servicios Aéreos Mineros | | | SRE | SERAMI | Ciudad Guayana | 1978 | |
| Sundance Air | | | SUV | DANCEAIR | Porlamar | 2002 | |
| Transmandu | | | TMD | TRANSMANDU | Ciudad Guayana | 1979 | |
| Venezolana | | WW | VNE | VENEZOLANA | Caracas; Maracaibo | 2001 | |

=== Cargo airlines ===
| Airline | Image | IATA | ICAO | Callsign | Hub(s) | Founded | Notes |
|---|---|---|---|---|---|---|---|
| Emtrasur Cargo | | | ESU | EMTRASUR | Maracay-El Libertador | 2020 | Cargo subsidiary of Conviasa. |
| Rainbow Air | | | TZR | RAIN-BEE | Porlamar | 2007 | |
| Solar Cargo | | 4S | OLC | SOLARCARGO | Valencia (VE) | 2001 | |
| Transcarga International Airways | | T7 | TIW | TIACA | Caracas | 1998 | In process of restarting |

== Defunct ==
| Airline | Image | IATA | ICAO | Callsign | Founded | Ceased operations | Notes |
|---|---|---|---|---|---|---|---|
| ACASA | | | | | 1956 | 1986 | |
| AeroAndinas | | | ARD | CORDILLERAS | 2013 | 2016 | |
| Aerobol | | | | | 1992 | 2006 | |
| Aero B Venezuela | | | | | 1977 | 1984 | |
| Aero Ejecutivos | | | VEJ | VENEJECUTIV | 1975 | 2008 | |
| AeroLatin | | | | | 1994 | 2000 | |
| Aerolineas Latinas | | 2L | LTN | LATINAS | 1989 | 1994 | Renamed to AeroLatin. |
| Aeronaves del Centro | | AG | AGA | | 1980 | 1987 | |
| Aerosucre Airlines | | | | AIR SUCRE | 2009 | 2010 | Never launched. |
| Aerovenca | | | AVC | | 1987 | 2000 | |
| Air Margarita | | PW | MAG | AGATA | 1992 | 1994 | |
| Air Venezuela | | 7Q | VZA | AIR VENEZUELA | 1995 | 2001 | |
| Aserca Airlines | | R7 | OCA | ASERCA | 1968 | 2018 | |
| Avensa | | VE | AVE | AVENSA | 1943 | 2004 | |
| Avior Regional | | 3R | RGR | AVIOR REGIONAL | 2015 | 2016 | Suspended indefinitely. |
| Costa Airlines | | | COT | MARA | 2012 | 2015 | Never launched. |
| General Air Cargo | | GC | GCQ | GENERAL CARGO | 1990 | 1996 | |
| Interamericana Carga | | J6 | IIA | INTERAMERICANA | 1982 | 1997 | |
| Kavok Airlines | | | KVA | CATATUMBO | 2005 | 2014 | |
| JD Valenciana de Aviación | | V5 | JDV | VALENCIANA | 1991 | 1994 | |
| LAI – Línea Aérea IAACA | | KG | BNX | AIR BARINAS | 1992 | 2006 | |
| LaMia | | | LMD | LAMIA | 2009 | 2014 | Operations were relocated to Bolivia, later ceased in 2016. |
| Latin Carga | | | LTC | | 1963 | 1980 | |
| LEBCA - Líneas Expresas Bolivar | | | | | 1949 | 1968 | |
| Linea Aérea Bolivariana | | | LBS | LABSA | 2001 | 2006 | |
| Línea Turística Aereotuy | | LD | TUY | AEREOTUY | 1982 | 2018 | |
| Midas Airlines | | | MIO | MICO | 1994 | 2001 | |
| Oriental de Aviación | | | | | 1995 | 1999 | |
| Perla Airlines | | DP | PLV | PERLA | 2006 | 2018 | |
| RANSA - Rutas Aéreas Nacionales | | | | | 1948 | 1966 | |
| Rentavion | | | RNT | RENTAVION | 1988 | 2000 | |
| Santa Barbara Airlines | | BJ;S3 | BBR | SANTA BARBARA | 1995 | 2008 | Renamed to SBA Airlines. |
| SBA Airlines | | S3 | BBR | SANTA BARBARA | 2008 | 2018 | |
| Servicios Aeronáuticos Varina | | FV | VRA | SAVAR | 1982 | 1984 | |
| Servivensa | | VC | SVV | SERVIVENSA | 1989 | 2003 | |
| SkyVen Cielos de Venezuela | | | VSK | SKYVEN | 1998 | 1998 | Never launched. |
| Sol America | | 6S | ESC | SOLAMERICA | 1980 | 2010 | |
| TACA de Venezuela | | | | | 1945 | 1957 | Taken over by Aeropostal. |
| Tranaca | | | THC | | 1992 | 2006 | |
| Transaven | | | VEN | TRANSAVEN AIRLINE | 1988 | 2010 | |
| Transcarga | | C7 | | | 1968 | 1979 | Formed by Viasa to take-over LEBCA. Merged back into Viasa. |
| Transporte Aereo Andino | | | EAA | TANDINO | 1999 | 2011 | |
| VenexCargo | | | VNX | | 1990 | 1996 | |
| Vensecar Internacional | | V4 | VEC | VECAR | 1996 | 2025 | |
| Viasa | | VA | VIA | VIASA | 1960 | 1997 | Liquidated. |
| Zuliana de Aviación | | OD | ULA | ZULIANA | 1985 | 1997 | |

== See also ==
- List of airlines of the Americas
- List of defunct airlines of the Americas
- List of Defunct airlines of Venezuela
