= Aero Ejecutivos =

Venezuelan airline

AeroEjecutivos C.A.

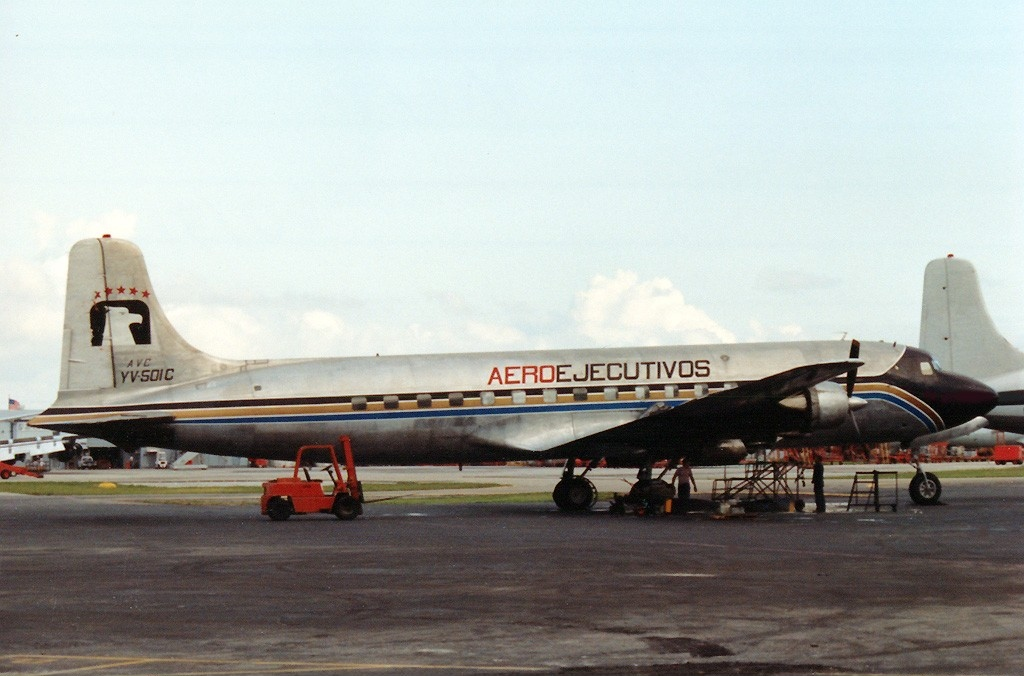
IATA	ICAO	Call sign
-	VEJ	VENEJECUTIV
- Founded: 1975
- Ceased operations: 2008
- Hubs: Óscar Machado Zuloaga International Airport
- Fleet size: 4
- Destinations: 4
- Headquarters: Maiquetia, Venezuela
- Website: www.aeroejecutivos.com.ve

AeroEjecutivos C.A. was a Venezuelan scheduled and charter regional airline headquartered in Maiquetia and based at Óscar Machado Zuloaga International Airport.

== Destinations ==
As of September 2006, the airline operated scheduled services to:

- Venezuela
  - Canaima (Canaima Airport)
  - Caracas (Óscar Machado Zuloaga International Airport) Hub
  - El Yavi (El Yavi Airport)
  - Los Roques (Los Roques Airport)

== Fleet ==
AeroEjecutivos was one of the few airlines in South America and the only one in Venezuela to fly classic aircraft in their normal scheduled flights.

- 1 Beechcraft Model 18
- 1 Convair CV-440
- 4 Douglas C-47 Skytrain
- 2 Douglas C-118A
- 4 Douglas DC-3A
- 1 Learjet 25C

== Accidents and incidents ==
- On December 25, 1985, a Douglas C-47D (registered YV-425C) ditched off following a double engine failure in flight, the crew was forced to ditch the aircraft that came to rest off Cumana. There were no casualties; the aircraft sank and was lost.
- On September 18, 1992, a Douglas C-118A (registered YV-502C) crashed into the Atlantic Ocean while flying from Willemstad to Miami. Weather along the route was poor with a heavy build up of thunderstorms. All 3 occupants on board were killed.

== See also ==
- List of defunct airlines of Venezuela
