= RUTACA Airlines =

Venezuelan airline

IATA	ICAO	Call sign
5R	RUC	RUTACA
- Founded: 26 March 1974; 52 years ago
- Hubs: Simón Bolívar International Airport
- Fleet size: 8
- Destinations: 15
- Headquarters: Ciudad Bolívar, Venezuela
- Key people: Carlos Silva (President)
- Founder: Evard Mares Bianchi
- Employees: +500 (2023)
- Website: www.flyrutaca.com

RUTACA Airlines (legally Rutas Aéreas C.A.) is an airline headquartered in Ciudad Bolívar, Venezuela with its home base at Tomás de Heres Airport and a hub at Simón Bolívar International Airport in Caracas.

== History ==
RUTACA Airlines was founded by Evard Mares Bianchi on March 26, 1974, and began operating non-scheduled cargo and passenger flights with small aircraft. It currently operates scheduled and charter services throughout the country.

The airline's operations suffered gravely during the 2017 Venezuelan constitutional crisis, including suspending flights between key routes.

== Destinations ==
former logo from 2014

As of November 2025, RUTACA Airlines serves the following destinations:

Country	City	Airport	Notes	Refs
Brasil	Boa Vista	Boa Vista International Airport		
Brasil	Manaus	Eduardo Gomes International Airport		
Curaçao	Willemstad	Curaçao International Airport		
Panama	Panama City	Tocumen International Airport		
Trinidad and Tobago	Port of Spain	Piarco International Airport		
Venezuela	Barcelona	General José Antonio Anzoátegui International Airport		
Venezuela	Barquisimeto	Jacinto Lara International Airport		
Venezuela	Caracas	Simón Bolívar International Airport	Hub	
Venezuela	Coro	José Leonardo Chirino Airport		
Venezuela	Ciudad Bolívar	Tomás de Heres Airport		
Venezuela	Cumaná	Antonio José de Sucre Airport		
Venezuela	Maracaibo	La Chinita International Airport		
Venezuela	Maturín	José Tadeo Monagas International Airport		
Venezuela	Porlamar	Santiago Mariño Caribbean International Airport		
Venezuela	Puerto Ordaz	Manuel Carlos Piar Guayana Airport		
Venezuela	San Antonio del Táchira	Juan Vicente Gómez International Airport		
Venezuela	Santo Domingo	Mayor Buenaventura Vivas Airport		
Venezuela	Valencia	Arturo Michelena International Airport		

== Accidents and incidents ==
- On June 5, 1987, a Britten-Norman BN-2 Islander (registration YV-230C) was disarmed in flight over the area of Upata, Bolívar state. All 10 occupants on board died.
- On January 25, 2001, RUTACA Airlines Flight 225, a Douglas DC-3 (registered YV-244C) crashed shortly after taking off from Ciudad Bolívar, killing all 20 passengers and four crew members.
- On October 16, 2008, a Boeing 737-200 (registered YV162T) landed on runway 28R at Simón Bolívar International Airport following a domestic flight from Puerto Ordaz. After touchdown, the airplane swerved to the left. The nose came to rest on the runway embankment.
- On February 15, 2009, a Cessna 208B Grand Caravan (registered YV1950) overran the runway at Guasdualito Airport following a domestic flight from Las Flecheras Airport. The airplane sustained damage to the propeller and the underside of the fuselage.
- On July 27, 2010, a Boeing 737-200 (registered YV169T) made an emergency landing at Ciudad Guayana international airport following a domestic flight from Ciudad Bolivar after problems in engine number one.

== See also ==
- List of airlines of Venezuela
