= SVCB =

SVCB might refer to:

- SVCB record, a record type in the Domain Name System
- Tomás de Heres Airport (ICAO code SVCB)
