= Sol de América =

Sol de América (Spanish, 'Sun of the Americas') may refer to:

- Club Sol de América, a Paraguayan sports club
- Club Sol de América (Asunción), a Paraguayan sports club
- Sol de América de Formosa, an Argentinian football club
- Sol América (El Sol de América C.A.), a former Venezualan airline
