= Aeropostal Alas de Venezuela =

Venezuelan airline

Aeropostal Alas de Venezuela C.A.

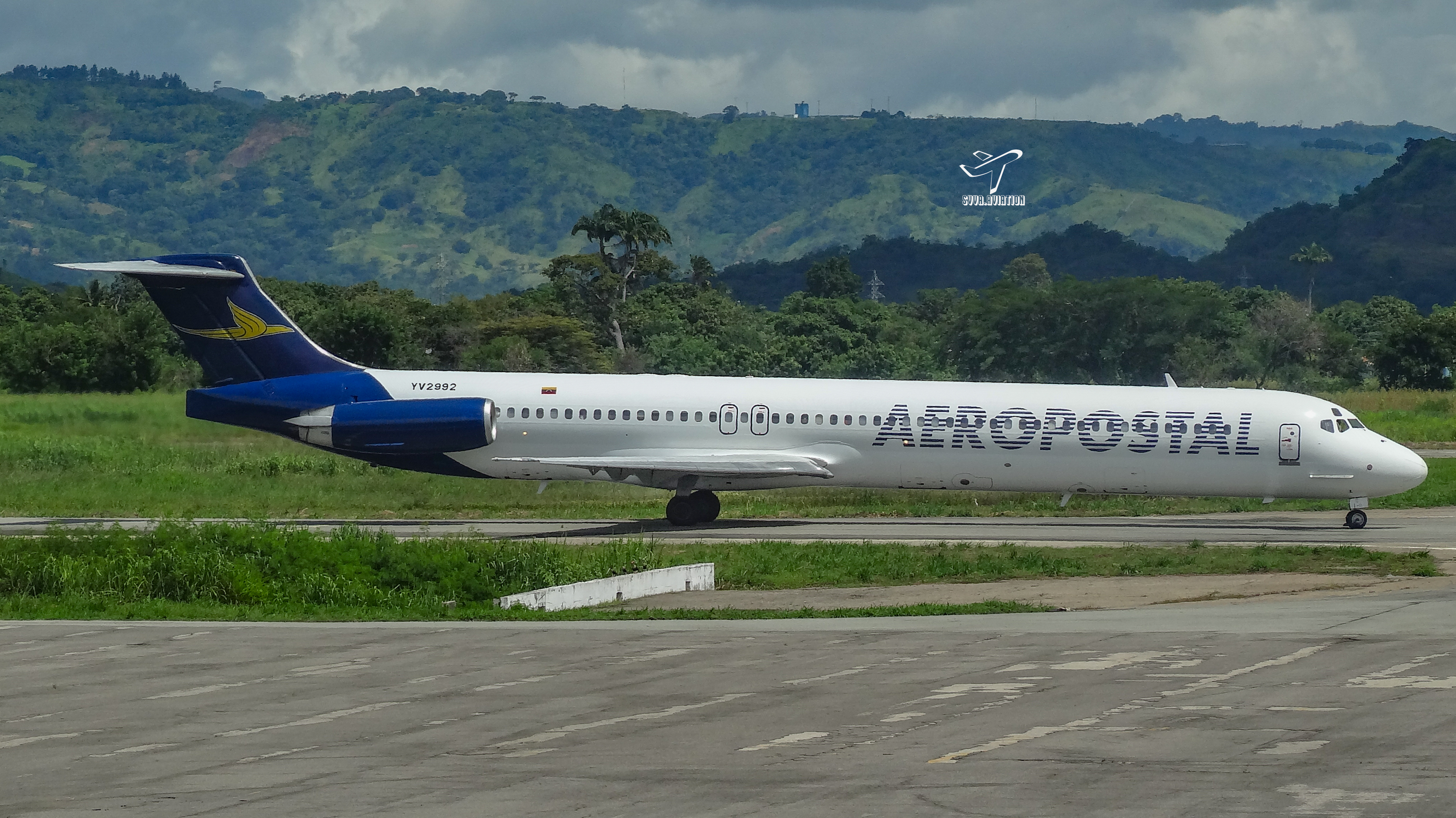
- Douglas DC 9-82
IATA	ICAO	Call sign
CW	ALV	AEROPOSTAL
- Founded: July 3, 1929
- Commenced operations: January 1, 1935
- Hubs: Simón Bolívar International Airport
- Frequent-flyer program: AeroPass
- Fleet size: 2
- Destinations: 3
- Parent company: Corporación Alas de Venezuela
- Headquarters: Caracas, Venezuela
- Key people: G/D Arturo Táriba Guillén (president & CEO)
- Employees: 423 (2025)
- Website: www.aeropostal.com

Aeropostal Alas de Venezuela C.A. is a state-owned airline of Venezuela based in Torre Polar Oeste in Caracas. It operates domestic services and international services in the Caribbean. Its main base is Simón Bolívar International Airport. The airline ceased operations on 24 September 2017, after 88 years of service due to its financial position. On 8 August 2018, the company announced that it would begin scheduled service again, first to Havana, Cuba, with three weekly flights.

== History ==
=== Early history ===
Venezuela was one of the first South American nations to resort to commercial aviation as an effective means of transportation. In 1929, the French company Aéropostale (known as Lignes Aériennes Latécoère until 1927), then under the leadership of its owner Marcel Bouilloux-Lafont, arrived in Venezuela. Aéropostale viewed Venezuela as the ideal bridge to link South America with the Caribbean islands of Guadeloupe and Martinique. This idea materialized on 3 July 1929. Three Latécoère 28's carried out the first flights of the new airline, although some Latécoère 26s were also used in those earlier routes. On 31 December 1933, the Venezuelan government purchased the airline after the French government inexplicably decided to stop subsidizing it.

=== Life as a government-owned company ===
Aeropostal 1950s Logo

Old Aeropostal Logo

Despite its new Venezuelan ownership, the airline continued to be run by French personnel under the direction of Robert Guérin until 1 January 1935, when its name was changed to LAV - Línea Aeropostal Venezolana and operations shifted to Venezuelan hands under the management of Commander Francisco Leonardi. At the start, the company was capitalized at 1,600,000 bolívares, but it was not until 21 May 1937, that the government of Venezuela secured full ownership of the airline. It did so through an injection of capital and by replacing the Latécoère 28's with several Fairchild 71's. The expansion program was further reinforced with the purchase of six Lockheed Model 10 Electras. In 1939, LAV's headquarters were moved from Maracay to Maiquetía because of its proximity to Caracas. That same year, Douglas DC-3s were introduced in order to transport larger cargo loads and passengers. By 1942, the fleet had grown considerably. LAV's first international flights began in July 1945, serving the city of Boa Vista in northern Brazil. It wasn't considered an international destination as it was close to Venezuela's border. LAV's second international route was to Aruba in January 1946. This was connected to KLM's international route structure.

After the war ended, LAV was re-equipped with newer aircraft, replacing its Electra and Lockheed Lodestar fleet, which was decimated by many accidents over the previous five years. Douglas DC-3s and Douglas DC-4s were introduced along with Martin 2-0-2 aircraft. In 1947, the airline introduced Lockheed Constellations to fly a new direct international route from Caracas to New York's Idlewild Airport. This new service started on 21 March 1947.

In 1951, LAV began service to Lima, Peru, and Bogotá, Colombia. LAV acquired the Bogotá route after they purchased 88% of TACA de Venezuela. Previously, TACA de Venezuela had a joint route agreement with the Colombian airline, LANSA. Until TACA de Venezuela was completely absorbed by LAV in 1958, the route to Bogotá was flown using TACA aircraft in TACA livery. In 1953, LAV opened a transatlantic service and began flying to Panama. The Constellation fleet was upgraded to L-1049G Super Constellations. An order for the first jet airliner, the De Havilland Comet 1, was placed, but with the Comet crashes of the 1950s, the airline never got their Comet jets. On 24 March 1956, LAV introduced its first turboprop, a Vickers Viscount 701, which was to replace the older piston-engined Douglas and Martin aircraft.

In the early 1960s, the Venezuelan government wanted to separate LAV's international and domestic routes, thus creating a new airline, Viasa, for international flights. A new livery was introduced for the new decade. The full airline title that had appeared on the Constellation fleet was simplified to a simple and bold AEROPOSTAL. The Constellations flew with a flying globe logo on the nose, which was also simplified, now appearing on the fin as a flying bird logo, a logo that would remain with the airline. Also in the early 1960s, the 'jet-prop' Avro 748 was introduced to replace the smaller piston twins that had made up LAV's fleet since 1938. Douglas DC-8 jets were introduced in 1961 to replace the Super Constellations.

During the 1960s and 1990s LAV continued to introduce new fleet types like first the Caravelle and then McDonnell Douglas DC-9 and the MD-80. During the late 1980s, Aeropostal substituted Viasa with a run from Caracas to Luis Muñoz Marín International Airport in San Juan, Puerto Rico, where the airline also sponsored WAPA-TV's weekly, youth-oriented Control Remoto television show.

=== Recent history ===
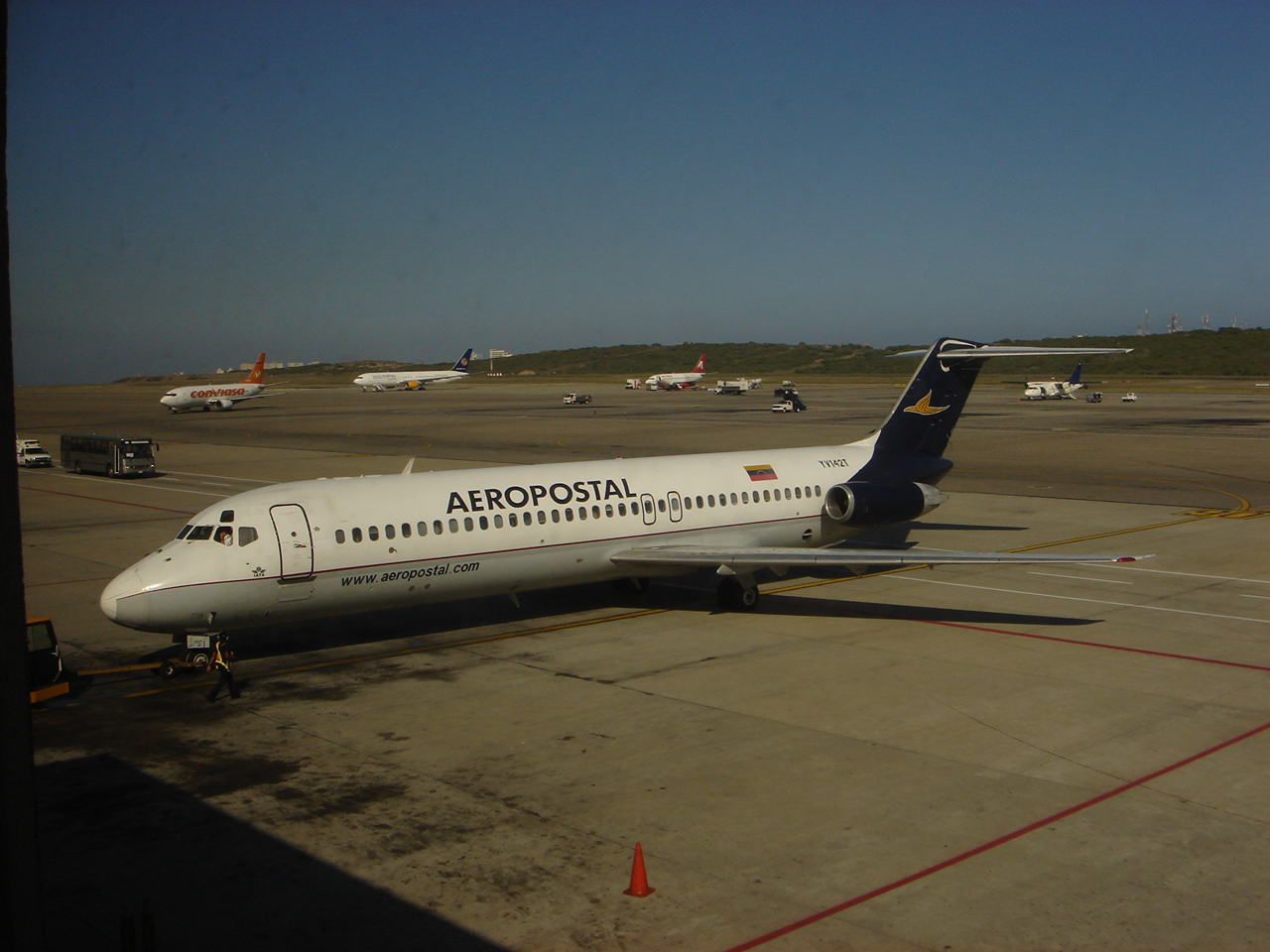
A McDonnell Douglas DC-9-30 at Simón Bolívar International Airport in 2006

In August 1994, commercial operations ceased, as part of a government effort to trim expenses. In 1996, Corporacion Alas de Venezuela (CAV), a private company owned by Nelson Ramiz, a Cuban-born US citizen, and his Venezuelan wife, Haydhelm Emilia Valesquez Morales, bought the assets from the liquidator at an auction in Caracas on 27 September 1997, in a transaction that led to litigation in New York and Caracas. The purchase was funded by an investment company Alas International Limited ("Alas"). Instead of delivering the purchased assets to Alas, as required by the funding agreement, CAV restarted airline operations on 7 January 1998, using the purchased assets without permission from Alas. Alas launched a series of lawsuits against Ramiz, Valesquez, CAV, and Aeropostal, and on 2 November 1998, the US Supreme Court of New York found in favor of Alas, a judgment later confirmed on appeal. The essence of the judgment was that neither Ramiz, Morales, CAV, nor the airline had any economic or legal interest in the various assets purchased in 1997, including the aircraft and the trade name "Aeropostal". As a result, CAV, the airline, and Ramiz entered into a settlement agreement on 29 February 2000, filed and entered at the New York Supreme Court with Index No. 601817/97 under which title of the aircraft transferred to the Alas owners but Alas allowed the airline to continue flying the aircraft in return for various payments. CAV and Aeropostal subsequently defaulted on the settlement and further litigation followed in the Supreme Court of the State of New York under case reference 652688/2012, as a result of which, CAV and Aeropostal owe the successors to Alas very significant damages.

In March 2007, Aeropostal had 2,319 employees.

Flights to the United States began in July 1998 and to Madrid in November 2001, although the latter have since ceased. In the late 1990s, Aeropostal introduced two leased Irish-registered Airbus A320-200s to fly alongside the fleet of DC-9, McDonnell Douglas MD-83, and Boeing 727-200 jets. At the end of 2007, Nelson Ramiz (then CEO) reduced the fleet of 22 to only 3, claiming that the currency controls imposed by the Venezuelan government prevented him from maintaining the fleet and that fare controls kept Aeropostal from making a profit. During that period, the Venezuelan Government planned to shut down the airline if major changes were not planned.

The National Institute of Civil Aviation temporarily grounded Aeropostal operations, leaving thousands of passengers stranded in the high-travel holiday season.

As of 2008, it was reported that the airline was sold to a group led by the Mahkled family from the state of Carabobo, Venezuela. The Venezuelan government later arrested the Makled family on money laundering and drug running charges, but this transaction has been challenged as ineffective, as neither Ramiz nor his wife had the power to transfer the shares, as these were pledged to Alas under the settlement agreement referred to above. In 2009, the Venezuelan government announced its intention to nationalise Aeropostal.

On 25 February 2011, Aeropostal's Special Managing Board officially announced the retirement of YV141T, the last DC-9-30 in its fleet. The final commercial flight was done on 10 March 2011. Although the -30s Series has been retired, the DC-9-50s would continue flying for Aeropostal, and according to LAV, there were no plans for their retirement in the next 3 years.

On 24 September 2017, Aerospostal ceased operations. The Board of Directors announced the retirement of the airline's operations due to financial and economic problems. On 8 August 2018, the company informed to continue flights again, along with the opening of a route to Havana from Caracas with three weekly frequencies.

== Destinations ==
As of November 2025, Aeropostal operated to the following destinations:

Country	City	Airport	Notes	Refs
Venezuela	Caracas	Simón Bolívar International Airport	Hub	
Venezuela	El Vigia	Juan Pablo Pérez Alfonzo Airport	Seasonal	
Venezuela	Porlamar	Santiago Mariño Caribbean International Airport		
Venezuela	Valencia	Arturo Michelena International Airport		

== LAV-Linea Aeropostal Venezolana photo gallery ==
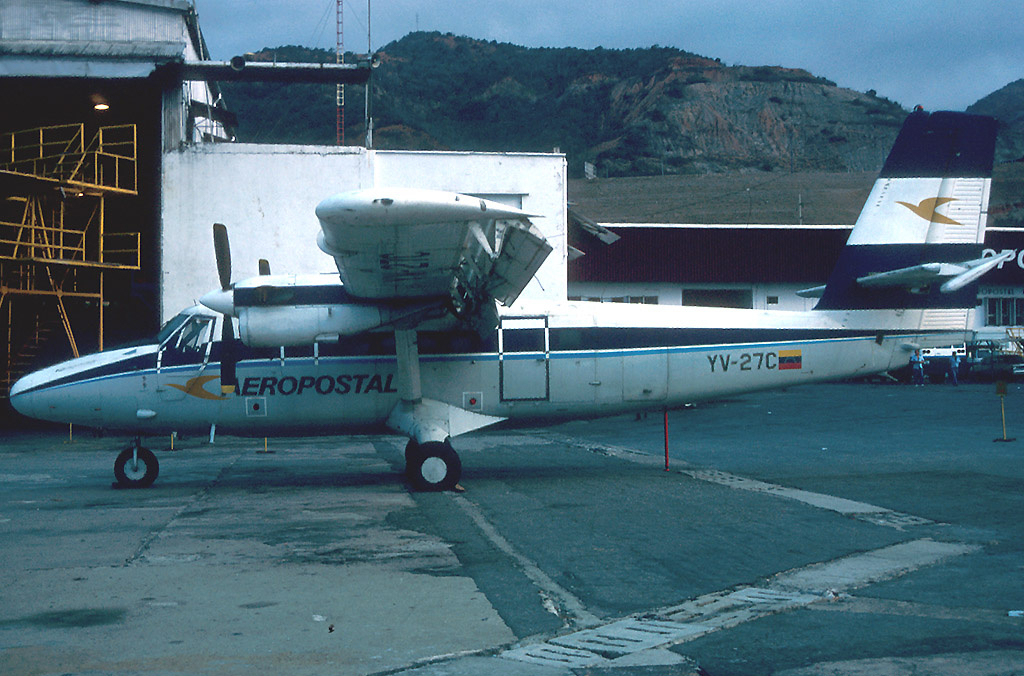
de Havilland Canada DHC-6 Twin Otter

== Accidents and incidents ==
Aeropostal has had a total of 24 accidents and incidents since 23 April 1937, with a total of 319 fatalities. The worst accident for Aeropostal (and the worst scheduled-airline accident in history until then) was on 20 June 1956, when 74 people were killed when a Lockheed Constellation, registration YV-C-AMS, crashed into the Atlantic Ocean off the coast of New York.

- On 27 November 1956, Linea Aeropostal Venezolana Flight 253, crashed while on approach to Caracas International Airport. All 25 passengers and crew on board were killed.
- On 25 January 1971, Vickers Viscount (registered YV-C-AMV) crashed into a mountain near Mérida. Thirteen of the 47 people on board were killed.
- On 1 November 1971, Vickers Viscount (registered YV-C-AMZ) crashed shortly after take-off from La Chinita International Airport, Maracaibo. All four people on board were killed.
- On 27 August 1972, Douglas C-47 (registered YV-C-AKE) suffered a failure of the port engine shortly after take-off from Canaima Airport on a domestic scheduled passenger flight to Tomás de Heres Airport, Ciudad Bolivar. The aircraft crashed whilst attempting to return to Canaima, killing all 34 people on board.
- On 14 August 1974, Vickers Viscount (registered YV-C-AMX) flew into La Gloria, Isla Margarita due to rains caused by Tropical Storm Alma, killing all 49 people on board.
- On 3 March 1978, a Hawker Siddeley HS 748 (registered YV-45C) crashed into the sea close to Punta Mulatos after an instrument problem. All 47 on board were killed.
- On 29 July 1984, Aeropostal Flight 252 from Caracas to Curaçao, two gunmen, one Haitian and one of Dominican nationality, hijacked the plane with 79 people on board. The hijackers demanded money, weapons, and a helicopter to remove five children from the aircraft, and also threatened to blow up the plane if stormed. The plane was stormed by Venezuelan commandos of the DISIP, both hijackers were killed, and all hostages were released, ending the 36-hour-long crisis.
- On 5 March 1991, Aeropostal Alas de Venezuela Flight 108 from Maracaibo to Santa Bárbara del Zulia crashed into a hillside after takeoff. All 45 on board were killed.
- On 6 March 2008, a McDonnell Douglas MD-82 (registered N905TA), which was carrying out flight VH501 from Miami to Caracas, was forced to land at the Arturo Michelena International Airport in Valencia due to the suspicion of a hydraulic leak on the right side of the aircraft.
- On 26 September 2011, a McDonnell Douglas DC-9-51 (registered YV136T) made a hard touchdown at Puerto Ordaz, causing both engines' (JT8D) pylons and support structures at the airframe to crack and distort, nearly separating the engines from the airframe. The airplane slowed safely, stopped on the runway, and was shut down. No injuries occurred; the aircraft received substantial damage. The passengers disembarked onto the runway.

== Inflight magazine ==
Pasajero ("Passenger") is Aeropostal's in-flight magazine published by Playalens, Inc., a Hispanic-owned publishing company in Miami. As of September 2019, it was published six times a year with a circulation of 20,000 copies distributed on all domestic and international Aeropostal flights.

== See also ==
- List of airlines of Venezuela
- List of airlines by foundation date
