= Miguel Urdaneta Fernández Airport =

Miguel Urdaneta Fernández Airport Santa Bárbara Del Zulia Airport
- IATA: STB; ICAO: SVSZ

Summary
- Airport type: Public
- Operator: IAAEZ
- Location: Santa Barbara del Zulia, Venezuela
- Elevation AMSL: 16 ft / 5 m
- Coordinates: 8°58′35″N 71°56′35″W

Map
- Location of the airport in Venezuela

Runways
Direction	Length		Surface
Direction	m	ft	Surface
01/19	2,700	8,858	Asphalt
- Source: WAD GCM Google Maps

Miguel Urdaneta Fernández Airport (IATA: STB, ICAO: SVSZ, FAA LID: Miguel Urdaneta Fernández Airport) is an airport serving Santa Bárbara del Zulia, a city in Zulia State, Venezuela. It is also known as Santa Bárbara del Zulia Airport. The airport is operated by the Instituto Autónomo de Aeropuertos del Estado Zulia (IAAEZ).

The Santa Bárbara Del Zulia non-directional beacon (Ident: STB) and VOR-DME (Ident: STB) are located on the field.

== Airlines and destinations ==
Airlines	Destinations
Aerolíneas Estelar	Caracas, Maracaibo

== See also ==
- Transport in Venezuela
- List of airports in Venezuela
