= Vensecar Internacional =

Venezuelan cargo airline

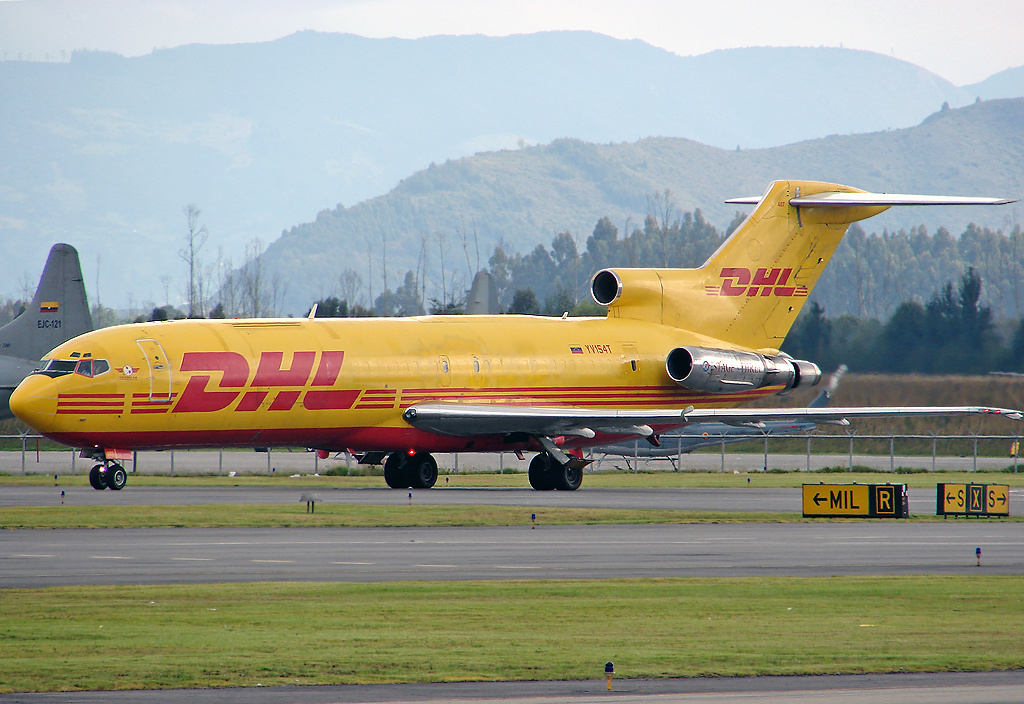
IATA	ICAO	Call sign
V4	VEC	VECAR
- Founded: January 31, 1996
- Ceased operations: June 11, 2025
- Hubs: Simón Bolívar International Airport
- Fleet size: 1
- Parent company: DHL (49%)
- Headquarters: Caracas, Venezuela
- Key people: Jose Henrique D'Apollo (owner)
- Website: www.vensecar.com

Vensecar Internacional C.A. was a cargo airline based in Caracas, Venezuela. It operated scheduled services around Central America and the Caribbean on behalf of DHL Aviation. On June 11, 2025, the airline ceased operations due to financial and operational difficulties.

== Fleet ==
Vensecar Internacional previously owned the following aircraft:

Aircraft	Total	Introduced	Retired	Notes
ATR 42-320F	4	2001	2025	
Beechcraft 65	1	1996	2001	
Boeing 727-100F	2	1997	2009	
Boeing 727-200F	4	2005	2016	
Boeing 737-400SF	2	2014	2019	
Dassault Falcon 20	2	Unknown	Unknown	
Learjet 24	1	Unknown	Unknown	

== See also ==
- List of airlines of Venezuela
