= San Carlos del Zulia =

- City
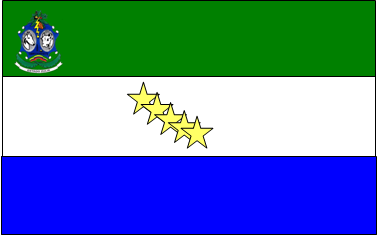
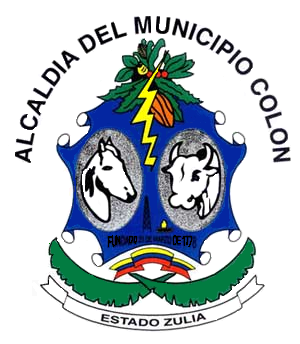
- Flag Coat of arms

- Location within Venezuela
- Coordinates: 9°00′N 71°56′W
- Country: Venezuela
- State: Zulia
- Municipality: Colón Municipality
- Founded: 14 March 1778
- Founded by: Nicolás José Antúnez Pacheco y de la Cruz
- Elevation: 6 m (20 ft)

Population (2011)
  - Urban: 56,500
- Time zone: UTC−4 (VST)
- Postal coded: 4044
- ISO 3166 code: VE-V
- Climate: BSh

San Carlos del Zulia is the capital of Colón Municipality, located in Zulia State, Venezuela. Founded on March 14, 1778, by Captain Nicolás José Antúnez Pacheco y de la Cruz y Velasco, alderman of the city of Maracaibo, accompanied by lieutenant Ramón Hernández de la Calle, in charge of the pacification of Motilón Indians populating the area.

== Description ==
After the ceremonies of foundation, the site was platted and occupied on March 27, of the same year when the first 13 plots of land were demarcated and distributed among some of the earliest settlers. Captain Antúnez Pacheco also appointed its first mayor, Rafael Echeverria, and the members of its first city council or Cabildo. The plans for the layout of the city had been sent to, and received approval from, the royal courts in Spain the preceding year. Work on its construction commenced with the appointment of the new council and the religious destinies of the city were trusted to the Capuchin Order.

San Carlos del Zulia grew to become an important livestock and food distribution center for the northern Andean region and Apure State. Its growth joined together a few neighboring populations like Santa Bárbara del Zulia, forming a single urban center which now includes various industries: from sawmills to meat packing. Modern-day San Carlos is a medium size city with a population of over 55,000 people. It is served by an airport, a thermal power station, and several educational and medical facilities. Natural sites in the area include: the Catatumbo, and Escalante rivers; the bogs of San Miguel de Agua Clara and Valderrama, and the Birimbay lagoon. The festival of Our Lady of Carmen takes every year place on July 16 and those of Santa Bárbara and San Carlos on November 4.
