= Mariño Municipality, Nueva Esparta =

Mariño Municipality Municipio Mariño
- Municipality
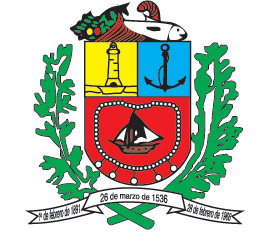
- Coat of arms

- Location in Nueva Esparta

- Location in Venezuela
- Coordinates: 10°57′18″N 63°51′37″W
- Country: Venezuela
- State: Nueva Esparta
- Municipal seat: Porlamar

Area
  - Total: 54.8 km^{2} (21.2 sq mi)

Population (2011)
  - Total: 97,667
  - Density: 1,780/km^{2} (4,620/sq mi)
- Time zone: UTC−4 (VET)
- Website: Official website

Mariño is a municipality of Isla Margarita in the state of Nueva Esparta, Venezuela. The capital is Porlamar.
