= 1978 Punta Mulatos Linea Aeropostal Venezolana HS-748 crash =

Aviation accident off the Venezuelan coast

1978 LAV HS 748 accident
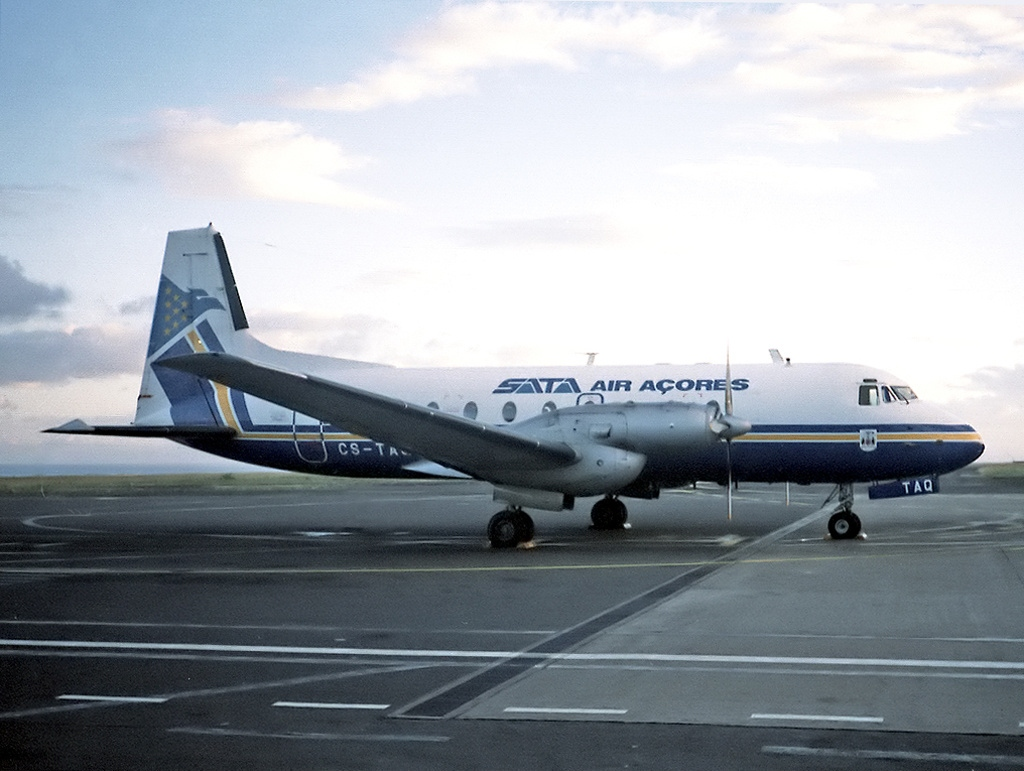
- An HS 748, similar to the aircraft involved

Accident
- Date: 3 March 1978
- Summary: Crashed after take-off with instrument problem
- Site: 5.2 km (3.3 miles) off the coast of Punta Mulatos, Venezuela); 10.652°N 66.92°W

Aircraft
- Aircraft type: Hawker Siddeley HS 748-283 Srs. 2A
- Operator: LAV (Línea Aeropostal Venezolana)
- Registration: YV-45C
- Flight origin: Caracas-Maiquetía Airport (CCS/SVMI), Caracas, Venezuela
- Destination: Cumaná Airport (CUM/SVCU), Cumaná. Venezuela
- Passengers: 43
- Crew: 4
- Fatalities: 47
- Survivors: 0

The 1978 LAV HS 748 accident occurred on 3 March 1978 when Hawker Siddeley HS 748 YV-45C, of LAV (Línea Aeropostal Venezolana), crashed into the sea close to Caracas-Maiquetía Airport, Venezuela. All 46 on board were killed.

== Accident ==
Two minutes after takeoff from Caracas-Maiquetía Airport, on a domestic flight to Cumaná Airport, the pilots declared an emergency and said they were returning to the airport due to problems with an attitude indicator. The aircraft crashed into the sea killing all 43 passengers and three crew. Due to the depth of the water it was not possible to recover major parts of the aircraft.
