= Aerolíneas Estelar =

Venezuelan airline

Aerolíneas Estelar C.A.

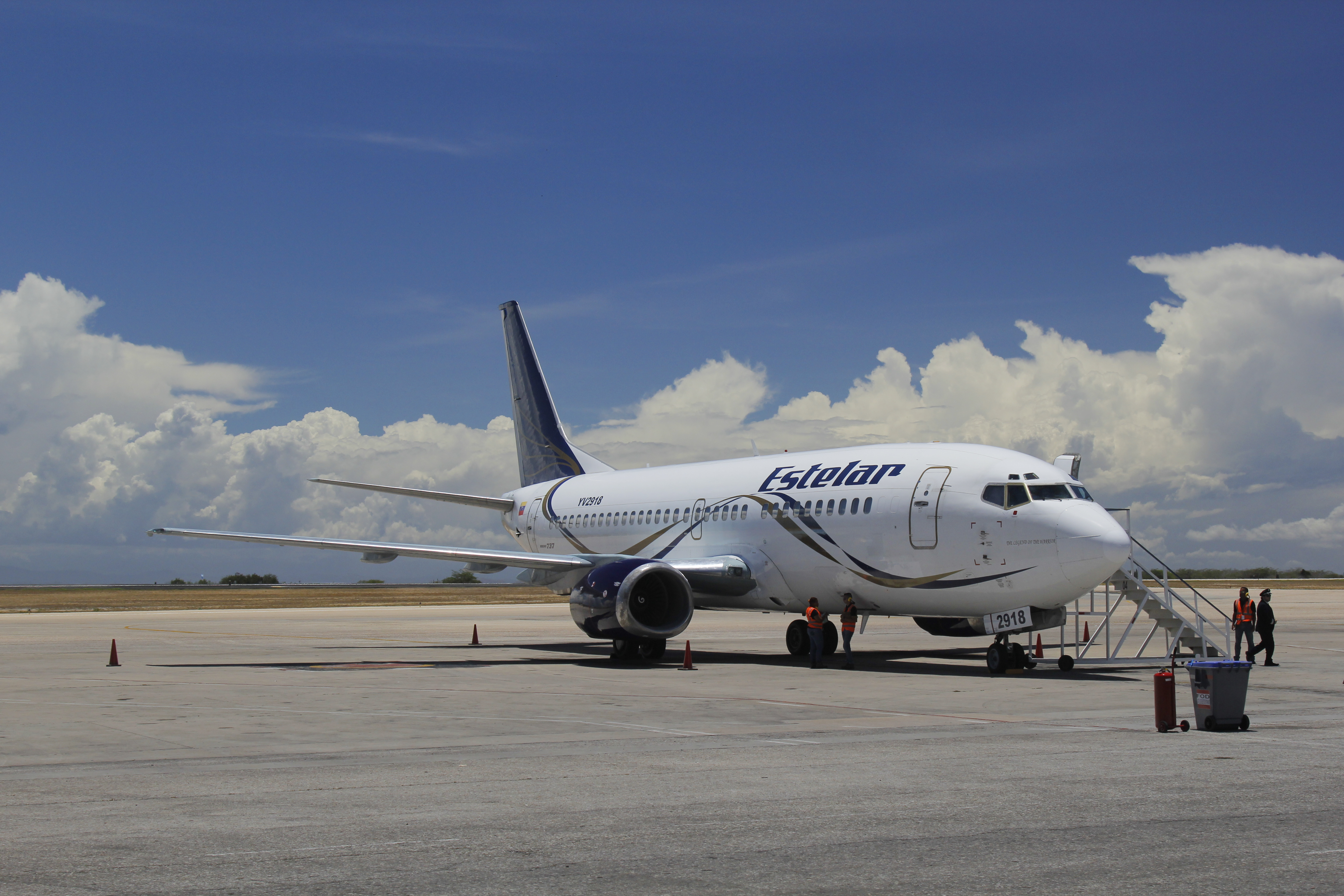
IATA	ICAO	Call sign
ES	ETR	ESTELAR
- Founded: 2009
- Hubs: Simón Bolívar International Airport
- Fleet size: 6
- Destinations: 10
- Headquarters: Caracas, Venezuela
- Key people: Boris Serrano (CEO)
- Website: flyestelar.com

Aerolíneas Estelar (formerly Estelar Latinoamérica C.A.) is a Venezuelan airline headquartered in Caracas operating out of Simón Bolívar International Airport.

== History ==
The airline was founded in 2009. Its first flights were to Porlamar and within months it commenced a route to and from Maracaibo. It was a charter flight company, until it managed to consolidate itself over the years.

On November 6, 2017, the Chilean airline Latin American Wings terminated the contract with Estelar for non-payment, which caused passengers on the Santiago route to be stranded for three days at the airport.

In December 2017, Estelar announced its first intercontinental route from Caracas to Madrid, Spain. Therefore, it expanded its narrow-body fleet with an Airbus A340-300 leased from Hi Fly Malta. The route to Madrid was operated with three weekly frequencies, replacing the old route operated by Conviasa. It also flew to Buenos Aires, with three frequencies a week. In July 2019, the airline leased an Airbus A380-800 from Hi Fly Malta because the leased A340 it had was under repairs, making Estelar the hemisphere's first airline to operate the aircraft type.

== Destinations ==
As of May 2025, Estelar serves the following domestic and international scheduled destinations:

Country	City	Airport	Notes	Refs
Panama	Panama City	Tocumen International Airport		
Spain	Madrid	Madrid–Barajas Airport	Operated by Iberojet	
Venezuela
Venezuela	Barinas	Barinas Airport		
Venezuela	Caracas	Simón Bolívar International Airport	Hub	
Venezuela	El Vigía	Juan Pablo Pérez Alfonzo Airport		
Venezuela	Maracaibo	La Chinita International Airport		
Venezuela	Maturín	José Tadeo Monagas International Airport		
Venezuela	Porlamar	Santiago Mariño Caribbean International Airport		
Venezuela	Puerto Ordaz	Manuel Carlos Piar Guayana Airport		
Venezuela	San Antonio del Táchira	Juan Vicente Gómez International Airport		
Venezuela	Santo Domingo	Mayor Buenaventura Vivas Airport		

=== Interline agreement ===
- Aeroregional

== Fleet ==
=== Current ===
As of November 2024, the Estelar fleet consists of the following aircraft:

Aerolíneas Estelar fleet
Aircraft	In service	Orders	Passengers			Notes
Aircraft	In service	Orders	C	Y	Total	Notes
Airbus A330-300	1	—	—	388	388	Leased from Iberojet
Airbus A350-900	1	—	32	400	432	Leased from Iberojet
Boeing 737-200	1	—	—	118	118	
Boeing 737-300	2	—	—	148	148	
Boeing 737-400	1	—	12	132	144	
Total	6	—				

=== Former ===
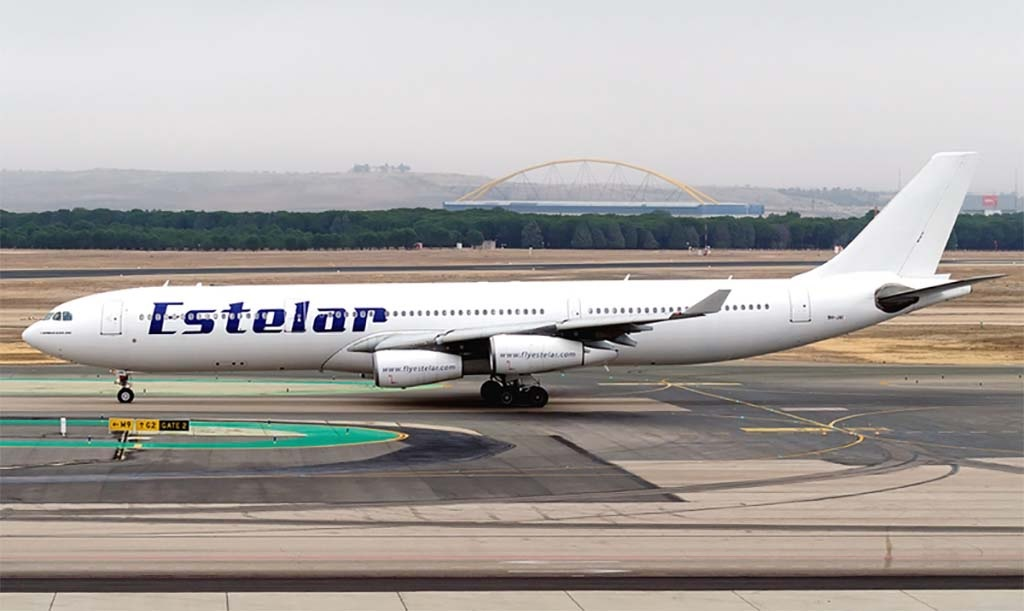
A former Estelar Airbus A340-300 taxiing at Madrid–Barajas Airport in 2019

Estelar had operated the following aircraft:

Aerolíneas Estelar former fleet
Aircraft	Total	Introduced	Retired	Notes
Airbus A340-300	1	2019	2020	Leased from Hi Fly Malta
Airbus A380-800	1	2019	2019	Leased from Hi Fly Malta

== Accidents and incidents ==
- On March 19, 2018, a Boeing 737-300 (registered YV2918) burst both tires on the right main gear after landing at Simón Bolívar International Airport. No one on board was injured and the aircraft was repaired.
- On March 18, 2020, a Boeing 737-300 (registered YV-642T) was flying from Buenos Aires to Caracas when it was diverted to Cacique Aramare Airport due to atmospheric pressure issues, according to the airline.

== See also ==
- List of airlines of Venezuela
