= Aeropostal Flight 252 =

1984 aircraft hijacking

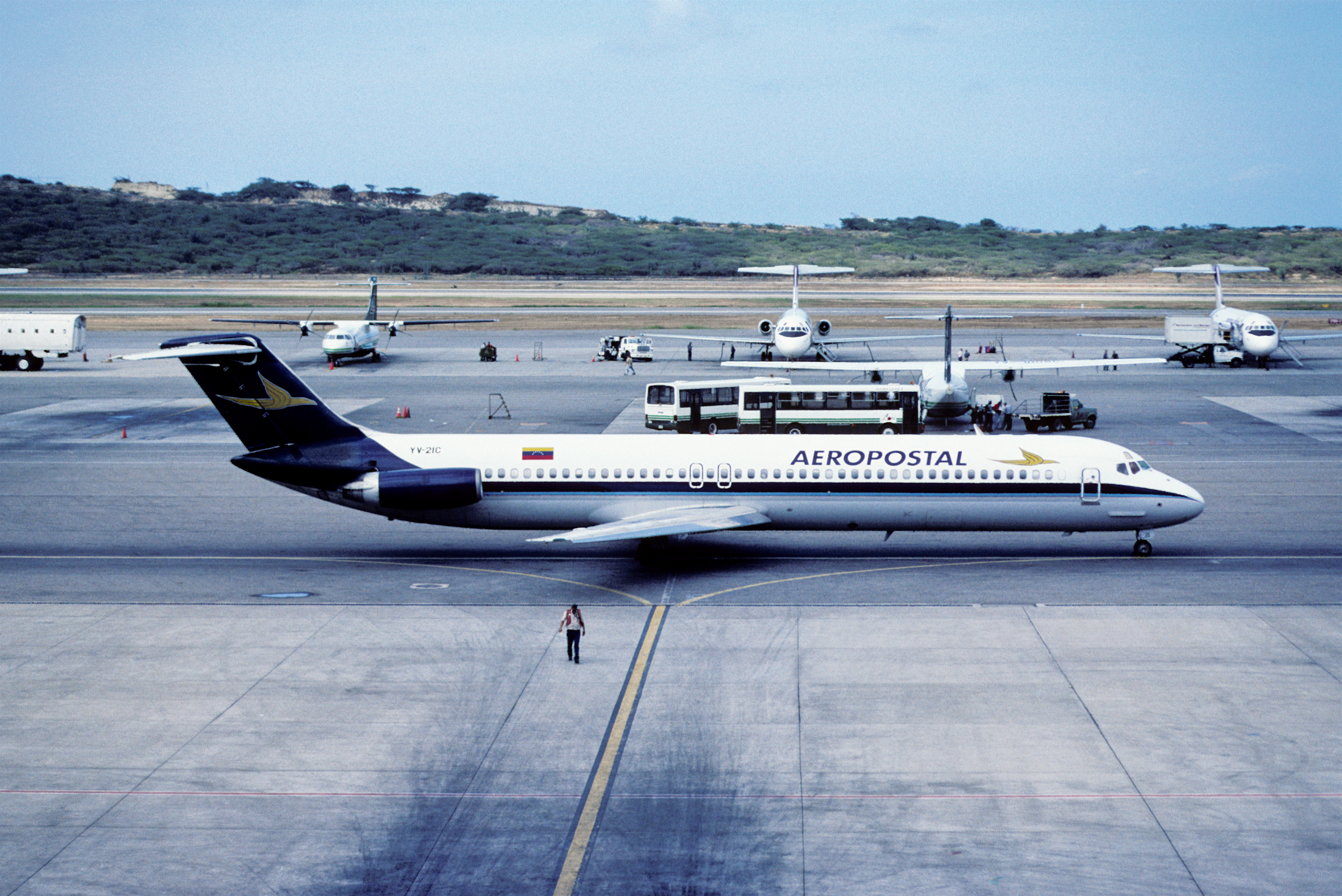
- The YV-21C, the aircraft involved in the incident in 2001.

Hijacking
- Date: 29 July 1984
- Summary: Hijacking
- Site: Caribbean Sea

Aircraft
- Aircraft type: McDonnell Douglas DC-9-51
- Aircraft name: El Zuliano
- Operator: Aeropostal Alas de Venezuela
- IATA flight No.: CW252
- ICAO flight No.: ALV252
- Call sign: AEROPOSTAL 252
- Registration: YV-21C
- Flight origin: Simón Bolívar International Airport, Caracas, Venezuela
- Destination: Curaçao
- Occupants: 89
- Fatalities: 2 (hijackers)
- Survivors: 87

Aeropostal Flight 252 was an Aeropostal flight from Caracas to Curaçao that was hijacked on July 29, 1984 by two men who held 87 people hostage for 38 hours, flying around Trinidad and Tobago, Aruba, and Curaçao. Although a pregnant flight attendant suffered a miscarriage during the hijacking due to the stress of the events, on July 31, a rescue operation by the DISIP commando unit, then-Commissioner General Henry López Sisco, with support from the U.S. Delta Force, stormed the plane and was successful, resulting in the release of all hostages and the deaths of both hijackers.

== Aircraft ==
The hijacked aircraft, a McDonnell Douglas DC-9-51, was delivered to Aeropostal on November 12, 1976, with registration number YV-21C. In 2005, the aircraft's registration number was changed to YV1121, and it continued to operate until 2006.

== Hijacking ==
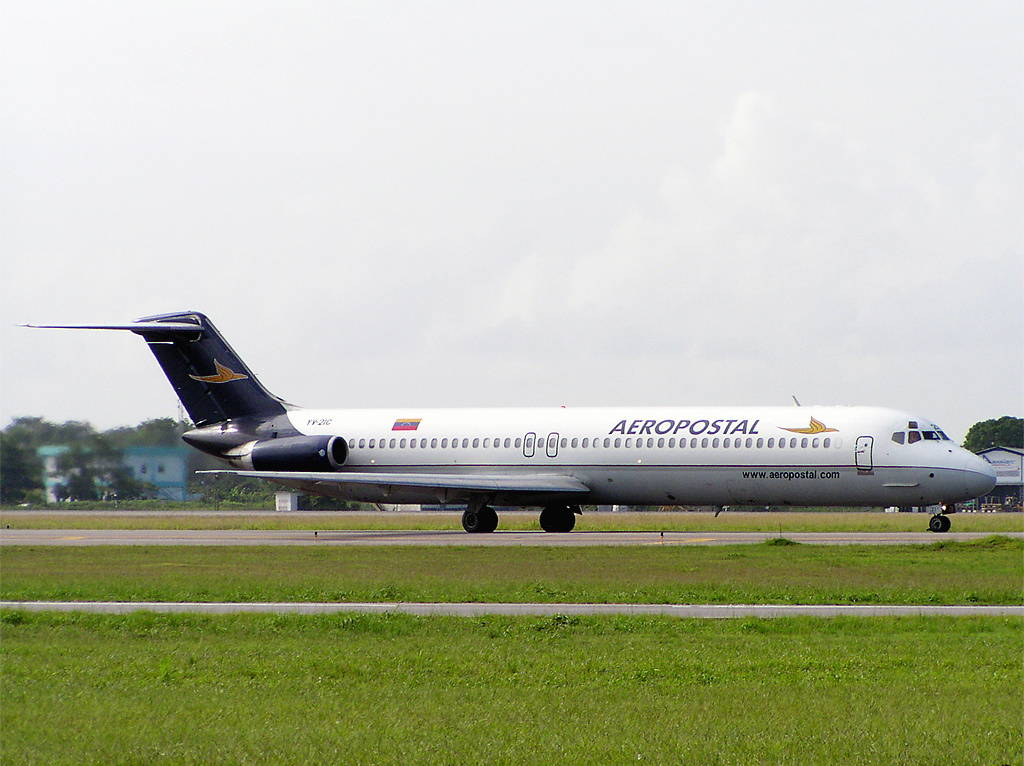
The aircraft involved in the hijacking in August 2003, nearly 20 years after the incident.

On 29 July 1984, Aeropostal Flight 252, named El Zuliano, departed from Simón Bolívar International Airport at 1:34 p.m., on a scheduled 30-minute flight.

During the flight, two hijackers, Dominique Hilertant and Segundo Félix Castillo, of Haitian and Dominican nationality respectively, took control of the aircraft and initially intended to land on Margarita Island in Nueva Esparta state; however, they later forced the crew to divert to Trinidad and Tobago. The hijackers issued several demands, including between two and five million US dollars, a helicopter, and later weapons.

The Trinidadian government refused to engage in negotiations with the hijackers, and after several hours the aircraft flew to Aruba, where the prime minister intervened and established telephone contact with Hilertant, though without success. The aircraft later departed for Curaçao. Negotiations lasted for hours, with both the hijackers and hostages gradually running out of water and food. After nearly 38 hours, the hijackers released six hostages, including Argentine Federico Ramón Puertas, who negotiated individually and agreed to deliver six million dollars in exchange for his pregnant wife, who remained on board the aircraft. The Venezuelan police team, led by then–commissioner general Henry López Sisco, had made little progress in negotiations and contacted Hilertant’s wife, Denys Martínez, who agreed to speak with the hijackers in an attempt to end the situation. Martínez asked her husband to release flight attendant Vilma Briceño, who had lost a pregnancy due to the stress of the situation, or to come out of the aircraft and speak with her directly; the hijackers ultimately chose to release the flight attendant.

== Motives ==
The captain of the hijacked aircraft, Arturo Reina, explained in an interview with Radio Caracas Televisión (RCTV) years later that the hijackers never confirmed what they were seeking. Although available recordings of negotiations between police forces and the hijackers do not indicate political motives, the men demanded weapons and money at the start of the discussions. The Spanish newspaper El País suggested the theory that the hijacking of the Aeropostal aircraft may have been intended to obtain funds and weapons for the Haitian opposition against dictator Jean-Claude Duvalier and linked Dominique Hilertant to political activism in Haiti, noting that: “In January 1983 (Hilertant) made statements in Santo Domingo in which he promised to fight against the Haitian regime. He then stated that he had recruited Dominican mercenaries.” One of those recruits was reportedly his accomplice Segundo Félix Castillo. The Spanish newspaper La Vanguardia also confirmed links between the hijackers and alleged plans to overthrow the dictator.

The hijackers met in a prison in the Dominican Republic and had shared the same boarding house in El Silencio, in Caracas, for several months. Hilertant was a former captain in the Haitian army who worked as a night porter at a hotel in Caracas and had been arrested in December 1982 for arms smuggling from the Dominican Republic in connection with a conspiracy against Duvalier. Segundo held multiple jobs, working as a welder in several countries.

== Rescue ==
Specialists from civilian and military units from the United States, originating from Fort Bragg, the base of the special operations unit Delta Force, arrived in Curaçao.

Henry López Sisco, commissioner general of the DISIP, met with the group on at least five occasions. Each side had prepared plans, but the final decision was taken by the prime minister of the Netherlands Antilles. The hijackers threatened to blow up the aircraft if they did not receive the money and helicopter they had demanded. Two hours before the assault, a technician from the regional airline Air ALM secretly boarded the aircraft, deflated the nose wheel, and removed several fuses in order to prevent the aircraft from taking off. Denys Martínez spoke by telephone with her husband Hilertant and asked him to abandon the threat of blowing up the aircraft. Finally, at 1:50 a.m., a twelve-man Venezuelan commission carried out a coordinated operation with airport authorities, switching off the airport lights, approaching the aircraft from different directions, and firing at its wheels. According to passengers, Dominique Hilertant noticed that an assault had begun and started pouring gasoline inside the aircraft. The commandos stormed the plane using stun grenades and killed Segundo Félix; Hilertant attempted to ignite the aircraft as they entered but was shot by the agents. All three doors of the aircraft were opened almost simultaneously and the hostages were released. Several passengers were taken to St. Elizabeth Hospital for treatment of exhaustion and minor injuries. The Aeropostal flight later returned to Caracas and brought all passengers back the following day, although it had to fly at low altitude due to multiple bullet holes in the fuselage.

After the events, several Haitian migrants were arrested in Zulia but were released hours later. The pregnant wife of Hilertant was deported to Colombia.

== See also ==
- Garuda Indonesia Flight 206
