= Sol América =

Venezuelan airline

IATA	ICAO	Call sign
6S	ESC	SOLAMERICA
- Founded: September 12, 1980
- Ceased operations: February 2010
- Operating bases: Josefa Camejo International Airport; Simón Bolívar International Airport
- Fleet size: 1
- Destinations: 7
- Headquarters: Caracas, Venezuela
- Key people: Ramón Yépez Boulton
- Website: www.solamerica.com.ve

El Sol de América C.A. (operating as Sol América Airways) was a Venezuelan airline that operated domestic charter services, headquartered in Caracas.

== History ==
Sol America was established on September 12, 1980, as a small air taxi based in Ciudad Bolívar, with two Cessna aircraft. By 2001, it changed management to target tourists and began operating commuter and charter flights to Los Roques and the Caribbean.

In July 2008, it passed into the hands of a new administration with a view to converting Sol América into an airline with scheduled and non-scheduled flights for passengers and national and international cargo, as well as offering charter operations, all this with the incorporation of a Boeing 737-200. In order to offer a better product and operate medium-range routes such as Cancún, Cuba, Dominican Republic, Colombia, among others. In October 2008, Sol America ceased its commercial operations for unknown reasons and retired its fleet.

On April 8, 2009, it began regular operations between Caracas and Maracaibo to reduce the deficit on this route, Venezuela's highest-demand route after Porlamar. It intended to expand in Latin America and, in 2011, become the largest airline in Venezuela. However, by February 2010, the airline was reportedly acquired by RUTACA Airlines.

== Destinations ==
Sol América operated services to destinations including:

Aruba

- Oranjestad (Queen Beatrix International Airport)

Curaçao

- Willemstad (Curaçao International Airport)

Venezuela

- Caracas (Simón Bolívar International Airport) Base
- Las Piedras (Josefa Camejo International Airport) Base
- Los Roques (Los Roques Airport)
- Maracaibo (La Chinita International Airport)
- Valencia (Arturo Michelena International Airport)

== Fleet ==
Sol América consisted of the following aircraft (as of April 8, 2009):

- 1 Boeing 737-200

Sol América formerly operated the following aircraft:

- Beechcraft 65
- Beechcraft 1900C
- British Aerospace Jetstream 31
- Britten-Norman Trislander
- Cessna 206
- Cessna 310
- Dornier Do-28
- Douglas DC-3
- Let L-410 Turbolet
- Piper PA-32R

== See also ==
- List of airlines of Venezuela
