= Santo Domingo, Táchira =

Santo Domingo
- Town
- Location in Venezuela
- Coordinates: 7°34′07″N 72°00′56″W
- Country: Venezuela
- Time zone: UTC−4 (VET)
- Area code: 5032
- Climate: Am

Santo Domingo, alternatively known as Santo Domingo del Táchira, is a city in Venezuela, located in Táchira.

== Climate ==
Santo Domingo experiences a tropical rainforest climate (Köppen: Af). The city's climate is characterized by consistently warm temperatures throughout the year and abundant precipitation, particularly during the wet season, which lasts from April to November.

Climate data for Santo Domingo (1991–2020)
Month	Jan	Feb	Mar	Apr	May	Jun	Jul	Aug	Sep	Oct	Nov	Dec	Year
Record high °C (°F)	36.0 (96.8)	36.9 (98.4)	38.5 (101.3)	38.2 (100.8)	38.0 (100.4)	38.0 (100.4)	36.7 (98.1)	35.6 (96.1)	36.0 (96.8)	36.0 (96.8)	36.2 (97.2)	36.7 (98.1)	38.5 (101.3)
Mean daily maximum °C (°F)	30.5 (86.9)	31.1 (88.0)	31.5 (88.7)	30.8 (87.4)	30.1 (86.2)	29.5 (85.1)	29.1 (84.4)	29.7 (85.5)	30.5 (86.9)	30.4 (86.7)	29.9 (85.8)	30.1 (86.2)	30.3 (86.5)
Daily mean °C (°F)	23.7 (74.7)	24.4 (75.9)	24.9 (76.8)	24.8 (76.6)	24.4 (75.9)	23.9 (75.0)	23.5 (74.3)	23.8 (74.8)	24.2 (75.6)	24.3 (75.7)	24.0 (75.2)	23.8 (74.8)	24.1 (75.4)
Mean daily minimum °C (°F)	19.5 (67.1)	20.2 (68.4)	21.0 (69.8)	21.4 (70.5)	21.4 (70.5)	20.8 (69.4)	20.5 (68.9)	20.6 (69.1)	20.8 (69.4)	21.0 (69.8)	20.8 (69.4)	20.1 (68.2)	20.7 (69.3)
Record low °C (°F)	8.1 (46.6)	13.3 (55.9)	12.7 (54.9)	13.0 (55.4)	15.9 (60.6)	15.3 (59.5)	13.7 (56.7)	10.2 (50.4)	15.5 (59.9)	16.3 (61.3)	15.8 (60.4)	11.9 (53.4)	8.1 (46.6)
Average precipitation mm (inches)	71.0 (2.80)	63.7 (2.51)	91.8 (3.61)	189.1 (7.44)	266.4 (10.49)	317.1 (12.48)	300.7 (11.84)	239.7 (9.44)	229.7 (9.04)	277.2 (10.91)	218.8 (8.61)	105.9 (4.17)	2,371.1 (93.35)
Average precipitation days (≥ 1.0 mm)	7.9	8.2	9.8	15.3	19.5	21.3	21.8	19.6	16.6	18.0	15.6	9.5	183.1
Source: NOAA

== Transportation ==
Santo Domingo is served by Mayor Buenaventura Vivas Airport, which is features limited domestic service on two airlines, Conviasa and Aerolineas Estelar. It is located 13.3 km (22 minutes by car) away from the center of Santo Domingo.
