= Santa Bárbara del Zulia =

Santa Bárbara
- Santa Bárbara del Zulia
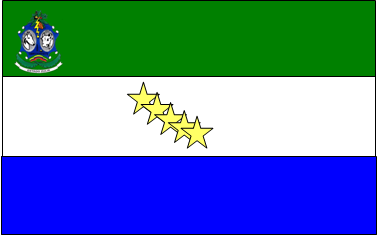
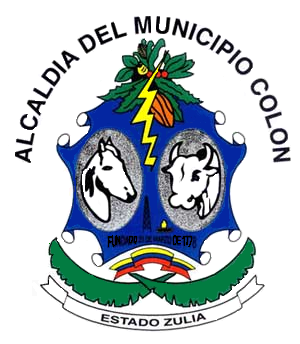
- Flag Coat of arms

- Location within Venezuela
- Coordinates: 9°00′0″N 71°57′0″W
- Country: Venezuela
- State: Zulia
- Municipality: Colón Municipality
- Founded: 1704
- Elevation: 7 m (23 ft)

Population
  - Total: 80,000 (estimate)
  - Demonym: Barbarense
- Time zone: UTC−4 (VET)
- Climate: Aw

Santa Bárbara del Zulia is a city in Zulia State in Venezuela. It is located to the south-west of Maracaibo Lake, in the Sur del Lago region of the state. It has a population of around 80,000. Santa Bárbara is connected by two bridges across the Escalante River with the city of San Carlos del Zulia, forming a twin city. The city was founded in 1780.

== Transport ==
Miguel Urdaneta Fernández Airport is located in the city.

== Education ==
Santa Bárbara del Zulia is home to the main campus of the Universidad Nacional Experimental Sur del Lago Jesús Maria Semprum (UNESUR - English: National Experimental University of Sur del Lago), founded in 2000.

== Climate ==
Climate data for Santa Bárbara del Zulia, Venezuela
Month	Jan	Feb	Mar	Apr	May	Jun	Jul	Aug	Sep	Oct	Nov	Dec	Year
Record high °C	32	32	34	39	38	37	39	36	35	33	32	32	39
Record low °C	20	19	20	25	26	24	27	23	22	20	20	19	19
Average precipitation mm	106	90	92	95	97	105	171	208	205	178	159	130	205
Record high °F	90	90	93	102	100	99	102	97	95	91	90	90	102
Record low °F	68	66	68	77	79	75	81	73	72	68	68	66	66
Average precipitation inches	4.2	3.5	3.6	3.7	3.8	4.1	6.7	8.2	8.1	7.0	6.3	5.1	8.1
Average precipitation days	5	3	7	8	5	9	10	12	12	11	9	6	97
Average relative humidity (%)	79	78	80	81	85	87	92	95	97	92	89	84	86.6
Mean monthly sunshine hours	181	179	185	186	199	170	167	157	159	167	170	178	2,098

== Notable people ==
- Governor and presidential candidate Manuel Rosales was born in the city on December 12, 1952.
- Gleiker Mendoza, a Venezuelan professional football player (born December 8, 2001)
