= Canaima Airport =

Canaima Airport Aeropuerto de Canaima
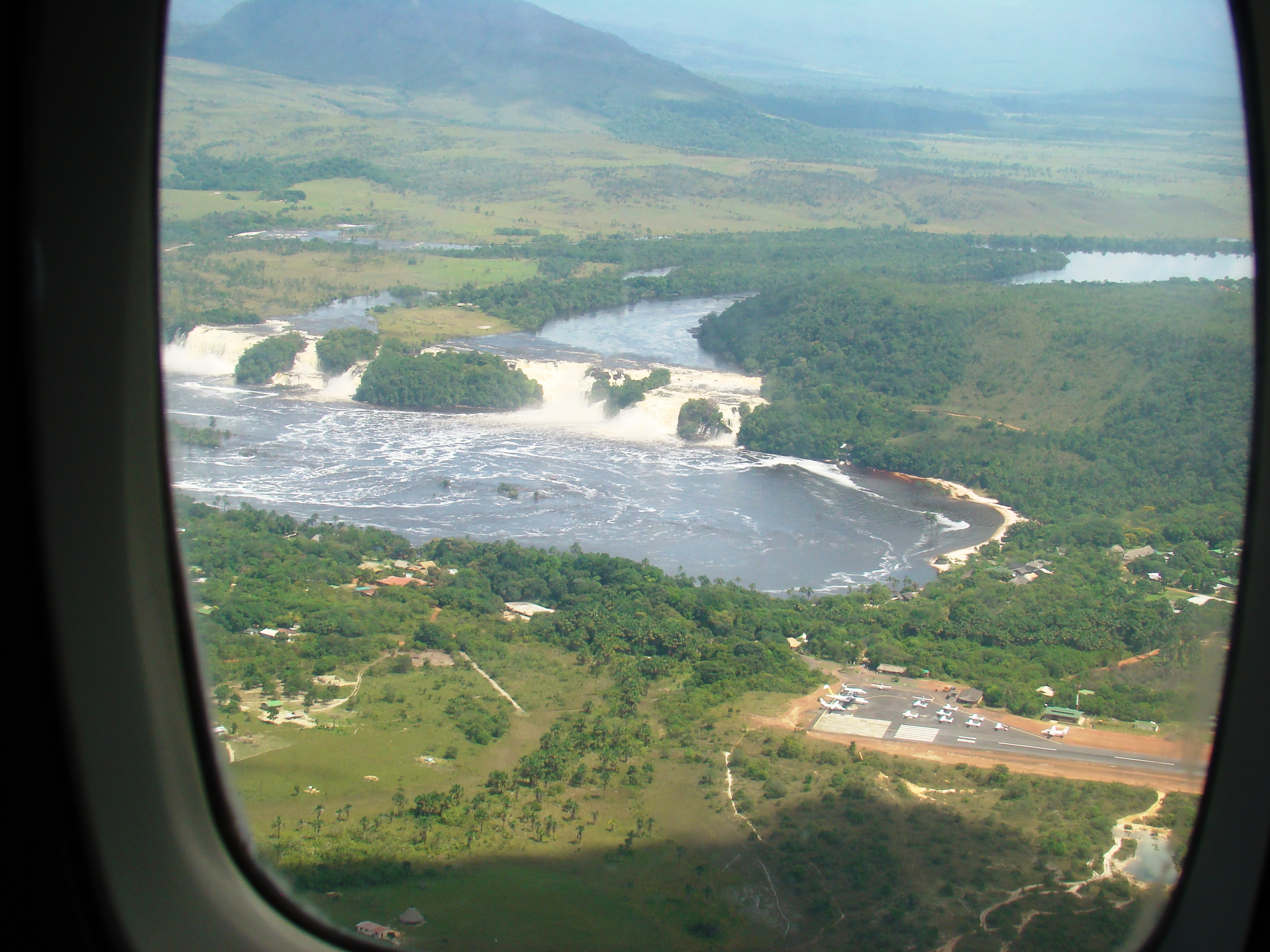
- IATA: CAJ; ICAO: SVCN

Summary
- Airport type: Public
- Serves: Canaima National Park
- Location: Canaima, Venezuela
- Elevation AMSL: 1,339 ft (408 m)
- Coordinates: 6°13′55″N 62°51′15″W

Map
- Location in Venezuela

Runways
Direction	Length		Surface
Direction	m	ft	Surface
18/36	2,155	7,070	Asphalt
- Source: WAD GCM Google Maps

Canaima Airport (Spanish: Aeropuerto de Canaima; IATA: CAJ, ICAO: SVCN) is an airport in Canaima, a town in Canaima National Park in the state of Bolívar in Venezuela. The airport and town are next to the Carrao Rapids on the Carrao River, and 46 kilometres (29 mi) downstream of Angel Falls.

The Canaima VOR-DME (Ident: CMA) is located 0.52 nautical miles (960 m) off the Runway 18 threshold.

== Airlines and destinations ==
Airlines	Destinations
Conviasa	Caracas, Ciudad Guayana, Santa Elena de Urairén

== Accidents and incidents ==
- On 27 August 1972, Douglas C-47 YV-C-AKE of LAV suffered a failure of the port engine shortly after take-off on a domestic scheduled passenger flight to Tomás de Heres Airport, Ciudad Bolívar. The aircraft crashed while attempting to return to Canaima, killing all 34 people on board.
- On 2 October 1998, Douglas DC-3C YV-611C of Servivensa crashed on approach to Canaima Airport. The aircraft had been on a local sightseeing flight to view the Angel Falls. One of the 25 people on board was killed.

== See also ==
- Transport in Venezuela
- List of airports in Venezuela
