= Óscar Machado Zuloaga International Airport =

Oscar Machado Zuloaga International Airport
- IATA: none; ICAO: SVCS

Summary
- Airport type: Public
- Serves: Caracas
- Elevation AMSL: 2,142 ft / 653 m
- Coordinates: 10°17′12″N 66°49′00″W
- Website: http://www.aeropuerto-caracas-omz.com/

Map
- Location of the airport in Venezuela

Runways
Direction	Length		Surface
Direction	m	ft	Surface
10/28	2,000	6,562	Asphalt
- Sources: GCM Google Maps

Oscar Machado Zuloaga International Airport (ICAO: SVCS) is a general aviation airport in the Miranda state of Venezuela, serving Caracas, the capital of Venezuela. The airport is named in honor of Oscar Machado Zuloaga, an engineer and civic developer.

The airport sits atop a ridge 20 kilometres (12 mi) south of Caracas, near the town of Charallave. Low mountain terrain lies to the north, between the airport and Caracas.

The airport has an ILS approach to Runway 10. The Charallave VOR-DME (Ident: TUY) is 0.6 nautical miles (1.1 km) northeast of the Runway 28 threshold.

== Facilities ==
Customs and Immigration are available. The airport has full services, fuel, maintenance, weather, aircraft/avionics repair shops, snack bar, pilots briefing room and two flight schools.

== See also ==
- Transport in Venezuela
- List of airports in Venezuela
