= Tomás de Heres Airport =

Airport in Venezuela

Tomás de Heres Airport Aeropuerto Nacional Tomas de Heres
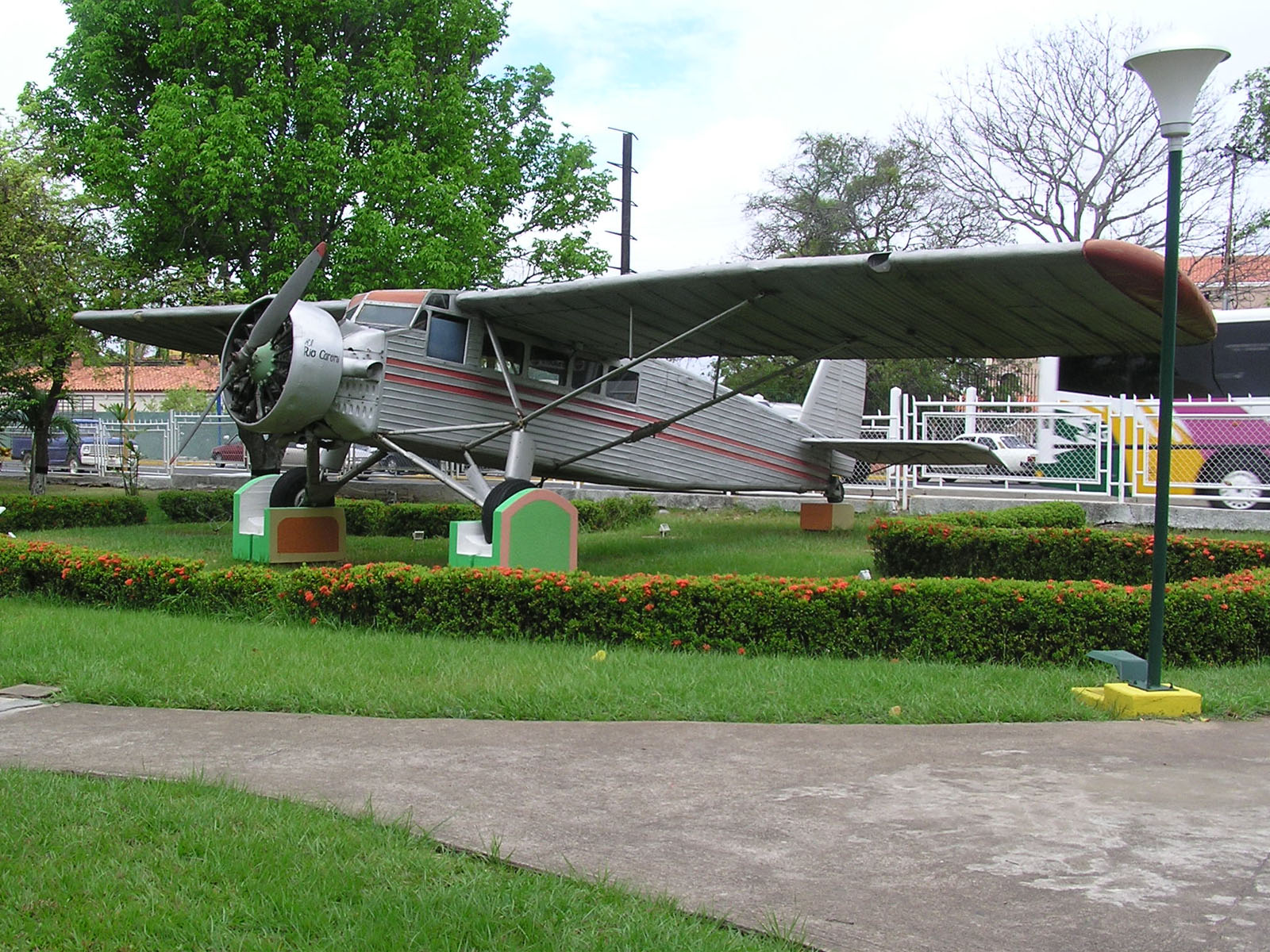
- Jimmy Angel's airplane
- IATA: CBL; ICAO: SVCB

Summary
- Airport type: Public
- Serves: Ciudad Bolívar, Venezuela
- Elevation AMSL: 197 ft (60 m)
- Coordinates: 8°07′20″N 63°32′10″W

Map
- Location in Venezuela

Runways
Direction	Length		Surface
Direction	m	ft	Surface
07/25	1,785	5,856	Asphalt
12/30			Closed
- Sources: GCM

Tomás de Heres Airport (Spanish: Aeropuerto Nacional Tomas de Heres, (IATA: CBL, ICAO: SVCB)) is an airport serving Ciudad Bolívar, the capital of the Bolívar state of Venezuela. It is named after Tomás de Heres, a hero of Latin American independence and governor of Venezuela's former Guayana Province.

The airport serves as a maintenance base for RUTACA Airlines.

== Airlines and destinations ==
Airlines	Destinations
RUTACA Airlines	Caracas
Transmandu	Charter: Santa Elena de Uairén, Porlamar

== Accidents and incidents ==
- On 25 January 2001, RUTACA Airlines Flight 225, operated by Douglas DC-3C YV-224-C crashed at Ciudad Bolívar killing all 24 on board plus one person on the ground. Another person on the ground was seriously injured. There were unconfirmed reports that a 25th person may have been on board the aircraft. The aircraft was on a non-scheduled domestic passenger flight from Tomás de Heres Airport to Del Caribe "Santiago Mariño" International Airport, Porlamar and had developed an engine problem shortly after take-off.

== See also ==
- Transport in Venezuela
- List of airports in Venezuela
