= Porlamar =

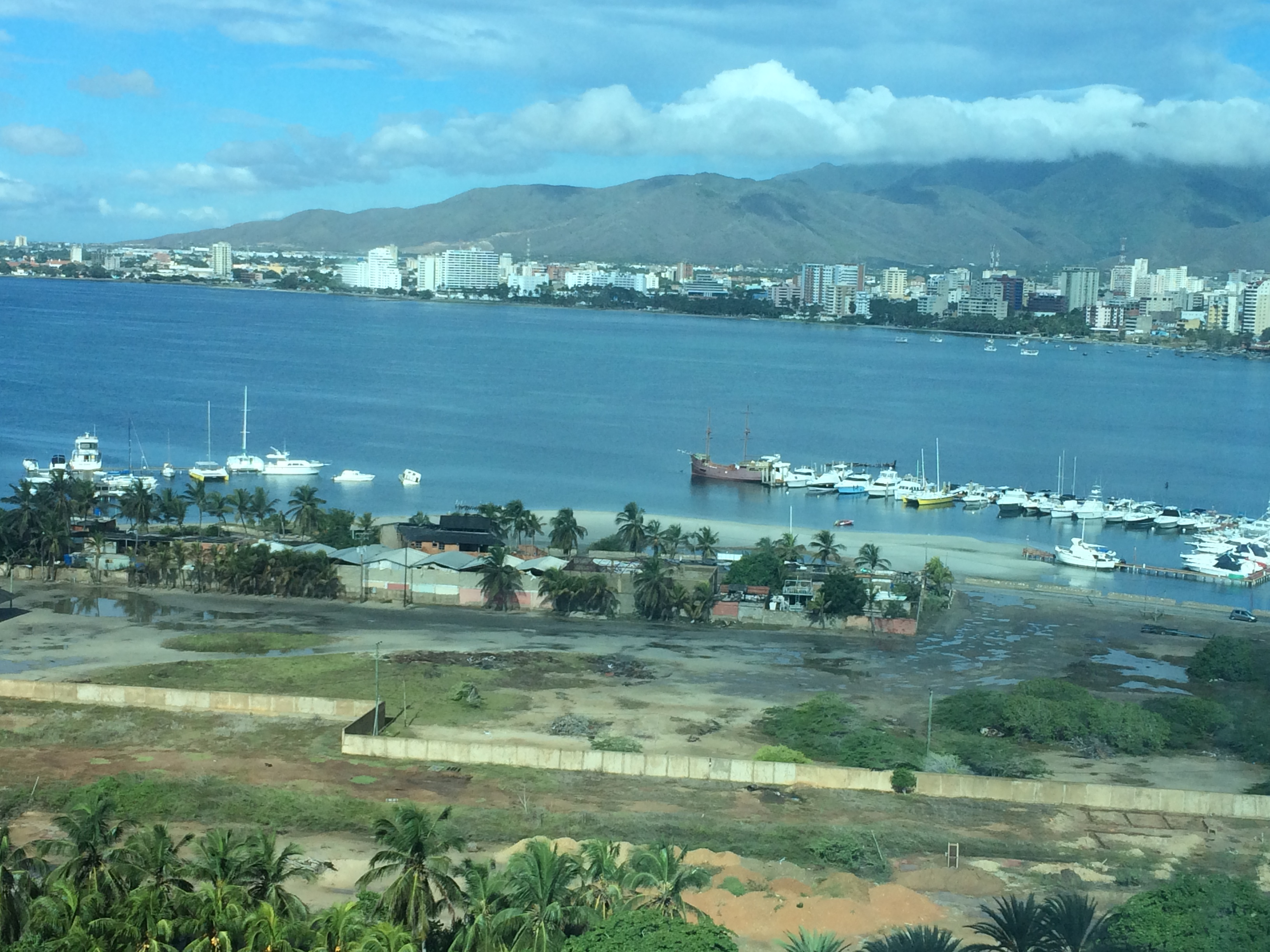
- Panoramic

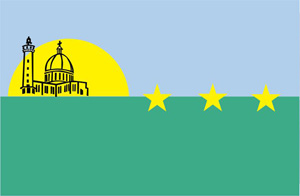
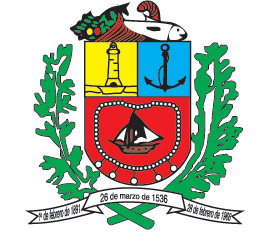
- Flag Coat of arms
- Nicknames: Villa del Espíritu Santo (English: House of the Holy Spirit) Pueblo de La Mar (English: Village by the Sea)
- Location within Venezuela
- Coordinates: 10°57′N 63°51′W
- Country: Venezuela
- State: Nueva Esparta
- Counties: Mariño
- Demonym: Porlamarense

Government
  - Mayor: Eneas González
- Elevation: 10 m (33 ft)

Population (2011)
  - Total: 144,830
- Postal coded: 6301
- Area code: 295
- Climate: BSh
- Website: Municipality of Mariño

Porlamar (Spanish pronunciation: [poɾlaˈmaɾ]) is the most populated city, major seaport and major center in the state of Nueva Esparta, Venezuela. It is situated on the southern coast of Margarita Island, one of three islands in the Caribbean Sea off the South American mainland which make up the state of Nueva Esparta, at a distance of 6 miles (10 km) from the state capital of La Asunción. Porlamar is the capital of Mariño, the most populous of the eleven municipalities into which the state of Nueva Esparta is divided.

== History ==
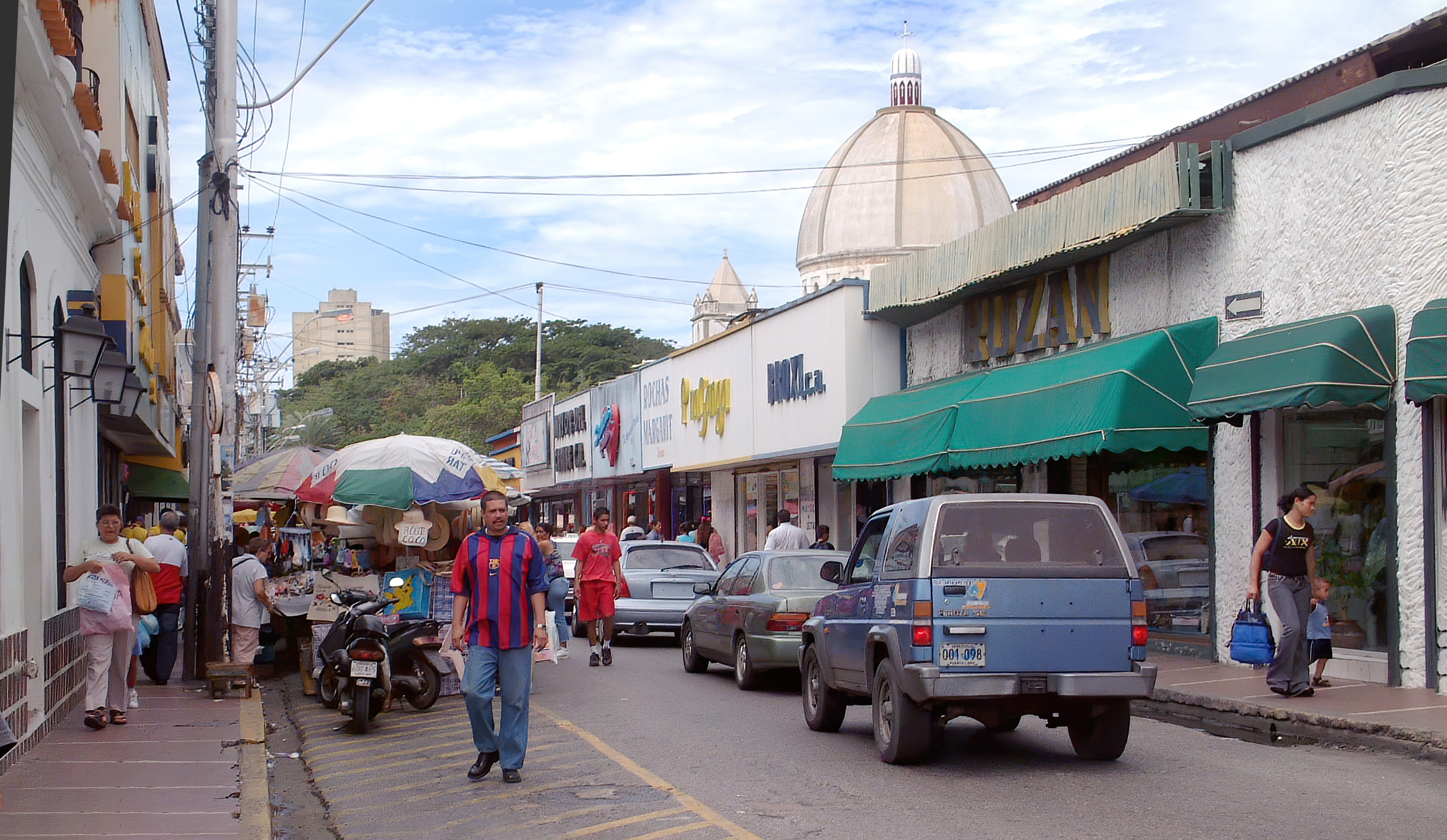
Downtown Porlamar.

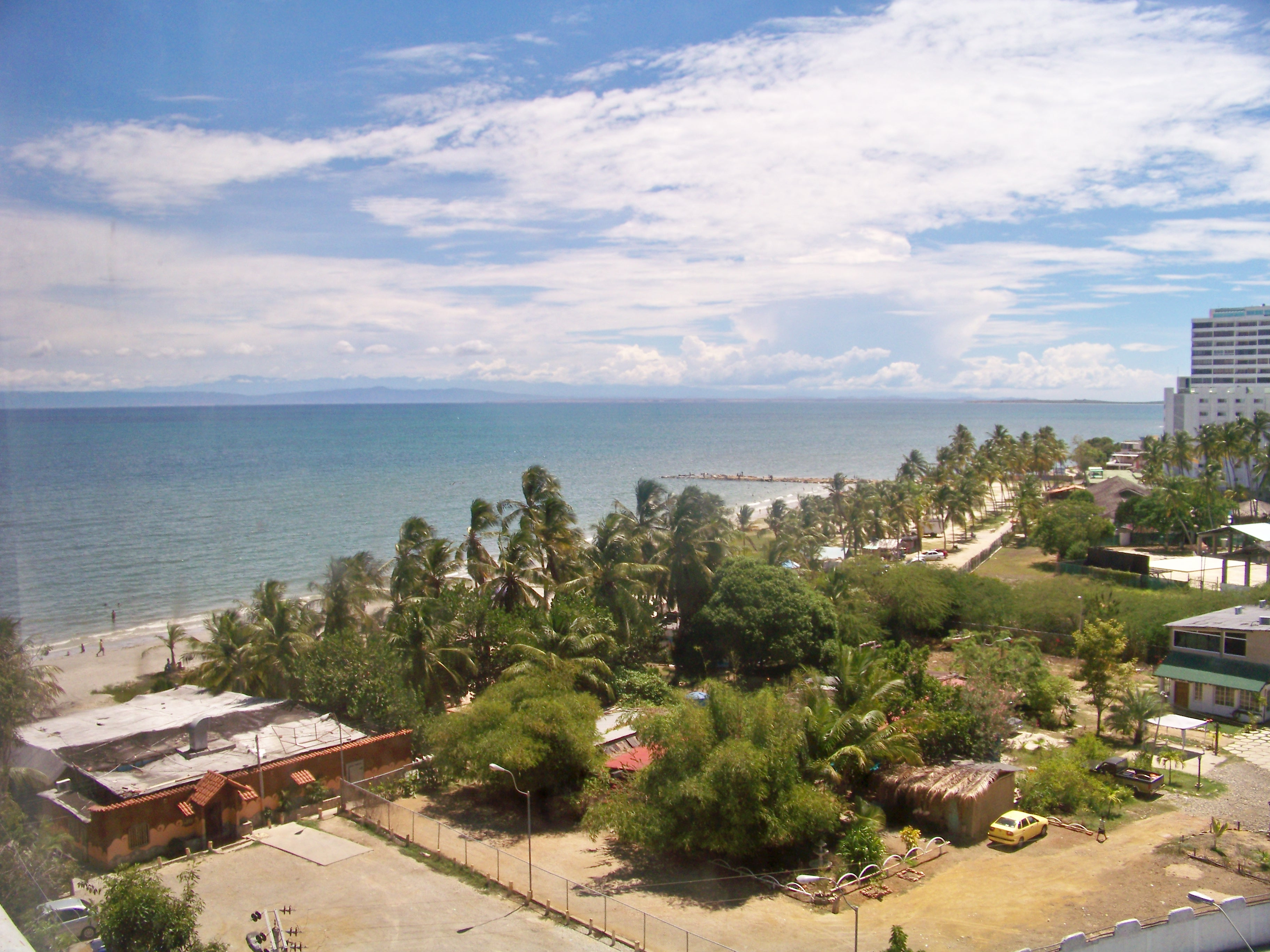
Caribbean Sea in Porlamar.

Christopher Columbus passed by the island on 14 August 1498. A large amount of pearls were discovered in the area in the 1500s and pearl hunting was conducted. Friar Francisco de Villacorta founded Porlamar on 26 March 1536. The city has gone by the names San Pedro Mártir, Villa del Espíritu Santo, and Pueblo de La Mar. Lope de Aguirre came to the island in 1561, and killed acting governor Sarmiento de Villandrando, seized the treasury in Porlamar, and burnt the harbour of Porlamar.

During World War I two extract factories for Tannin were constructed in Venezuela, one in Porlamar and the other in La Guaira.

== Population ==
The 1891 census reported a population of 5,693 for Porlamar. Porlamar accounts for one-third of the population of Margarita Island.

== Climate ==
Porlamar has a hot semi-arid climate (Köppen BSh) with hot day time temperatures and warm night time temperatures year round. Rainfall peaks from June to August and from November to February. Average sunshine hours are very consistent year round.

Climate data for Porlamar (1991–2020, extremes 1976–2020)
| Month | Jan | Feb | Mar | Apr | May | Jun | Jul | Aug | Sep | Oct | Nov | Dec | Year |
|---|---|---|---|---|---|---|---|---|---|---|---|---|---|
| Record high °C (°F) | 34.3 (93.7) | 34.7 (94.5) | 36.0 (96.8) | 36.9 (98.4) | 35.8 (96.4) | 35.2 (95.4) | 35.2 (95.4) | 36.0 (96.8) | 39.0 (102.2) | 36.0 (96.8) | 35.8 (96.4) | 35.3 (95.5) | 39.0 (102.2) |
| Mean daily maximum °C (°F) | 30.6 (87.1) | 31.1 (88.0) | 31.9 (89.4) | 32.9 (91.2) | 33.1 (91.6) | 32.3 (90.1) | 31.9 (89.4) | 32.6 (90.7) | 33.2 (91.8) | 32.9 (91.2) | 32.1 (89.8) | 30.9 (87.6) | 32.1 (89.8) |
| Daily mean °C (°F) | 25.9 (78.6) | 26.2 (79.2) | 26.9 (80.4) | 27.9 (82.2) | 28.4 (83.1) | 27.9 (82.2) | 27.7 (81.9) | 28.2 (82.8) | 28.7 (83.7) | 28.4 (83.1) | 27.7 (81.9) | 26.5 (79.7) | 27.5 (81.5) |
| Mean daily minimum °C (°F) | 23.0 (73.4) | 23.2 (73.8) | 23.8 (74.8) | 24.7 (76.5) | 25.3 (77.5) | 25.1 (77.2) | 24.9 (76.8) | 25.3 (77.5) | 25.7 (78.3) | 25.5 (77.9) | 24.8 (76.6) | 23.7 (74.7) | 24.6 (76.3) |
| Record low °C (°F) | 19.0 (66.2) | 19.3 (66.7) | 19.2 (66.6) | 20.3 (68.5) | 21.4 (70.5) | 21.8 (71.2) | 21.9 (71.4) | 21.2 (70.2) | 20.9 (69.6) | 21.9 (71.4) | 19.9 (67.8) | 18.8 (65.8) | 18.8 (65.8) |
| Average rainfall mm (inches) | 33.9 (1.33) | 19.8 (0.78) | 14.1 (0.56) | 10.5 (0.41) | 19.8 (0.78) | 58.9 (2.32) | 65.7 (2.59) | 77.7 (3.06) | 48.5 (1.91) | 58.8 (2.31) | 61.9 (2.44) | 57.2 (2.25) | 526.8 (20.74) |
| Average rainy days (≥ 1.0 mm) | 6.6 | 3.6 | 2.0 | 1.6 | 2.8 | 7.9 | 9.0 | 9.2 | 6.3 | 7.0 | 8.1 | 7.3 | 71.4 |
| Average relative humidity (%) | 87 | 87 | 85 | 84 | 86 | 87 | 87 | 85 | 84 | 85 | 86 | 87 | 86 |
| Mean monthly sunshine hours | 285.2 | 259.9 | 282.1 | 255.0 | 260.4 | 237.0 | 260.4 | 279.0 | 270.0 | 272.8 | 270.0 | 269.7 | 3,201.5 |
| Mean daily sunshine hours | 9.2 | 9.2 | 9.1 | 8.5 | 8.4 | 7.9 | 8.4 | 9.0 | 9.0 | 8.8 | 9.0 | 8.7 | 8.8 |
Source 1: NOAA
Source 2: Deutscher Wetterdienst (humidity and sun 1976–1990)

Climate data for Porlamar, Margarita Island
| Month | Jan | Feb | Mar | Apr | May | Jun | Jul | Aug | Sep | Oct | Nov | Dec | Year |
|---|---|---|---|---|---|---|---|---|---|---|---|---|---|
| Average sea temperature °C (°F) | 25.0 (77.0) | 24.0 (75.2) | 24.0 (75.2) | 25.0 (77.0) | 25.0 (77.0) | 26.0 (78.8) | 26.0 (78.8) | 27.0 (80.6) | 27.0 (80.6) | 27.0 (80.6) | 27.0 (80.6) | 26.0 (78.8) | 25.75 (78.35) |
| Mean daily daylight hours | 12.0 | 12.0 | 12.0 | 12.0 | 13.0 | 13.0 | 13.0 | 12.0 | 12.0 | 12.0 | 12.0 | 11.0 | 12.16 |
| Average Ultraviolet index | 10 | 11+ | 11+ | 11+ | 11+ | 11+ | 11+ | 11+ | 11+ | 11+ | 10 | 10 | 11 |
Source: Weather 2 Travel

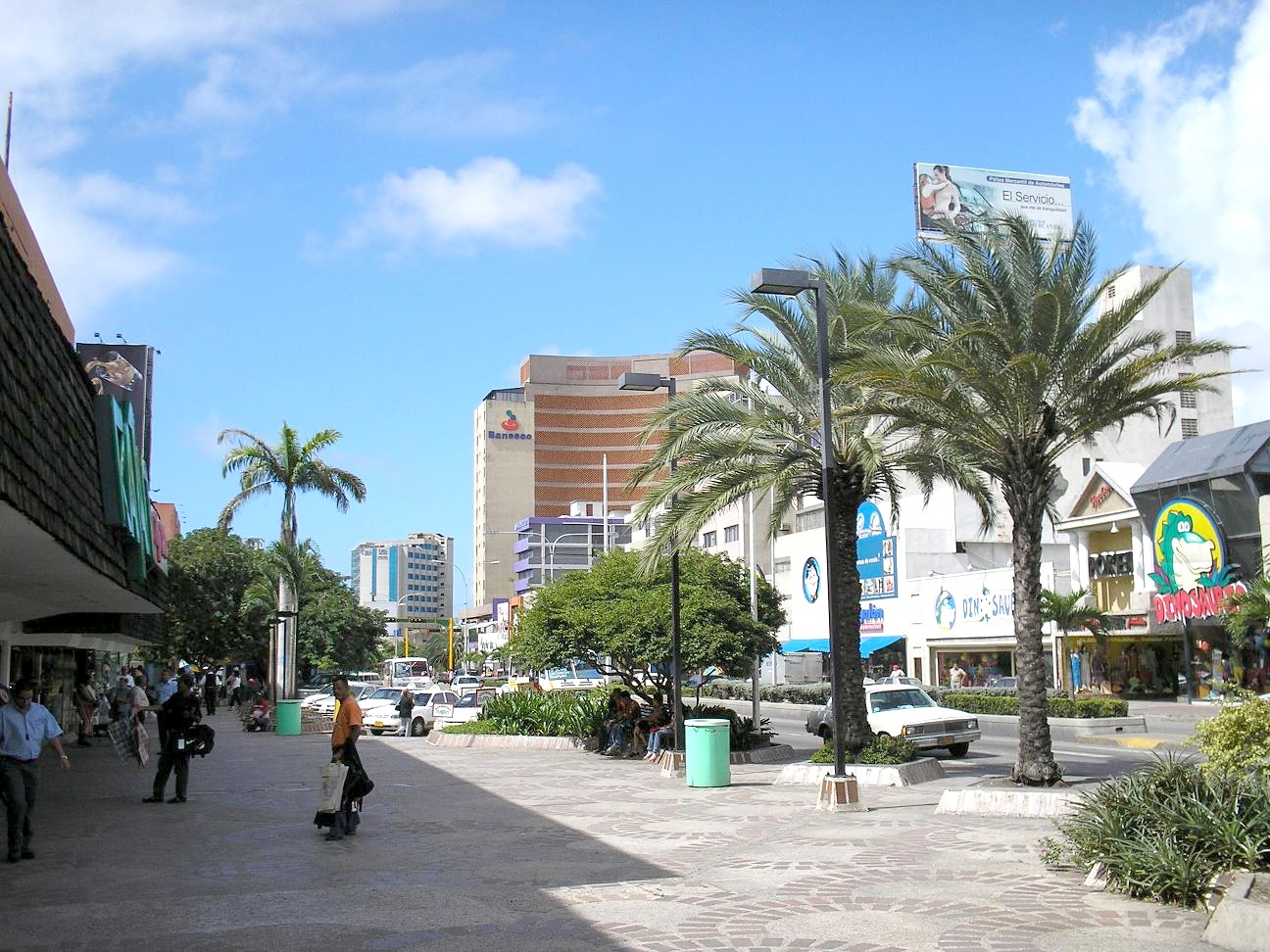
4 de Mayo Avenue.

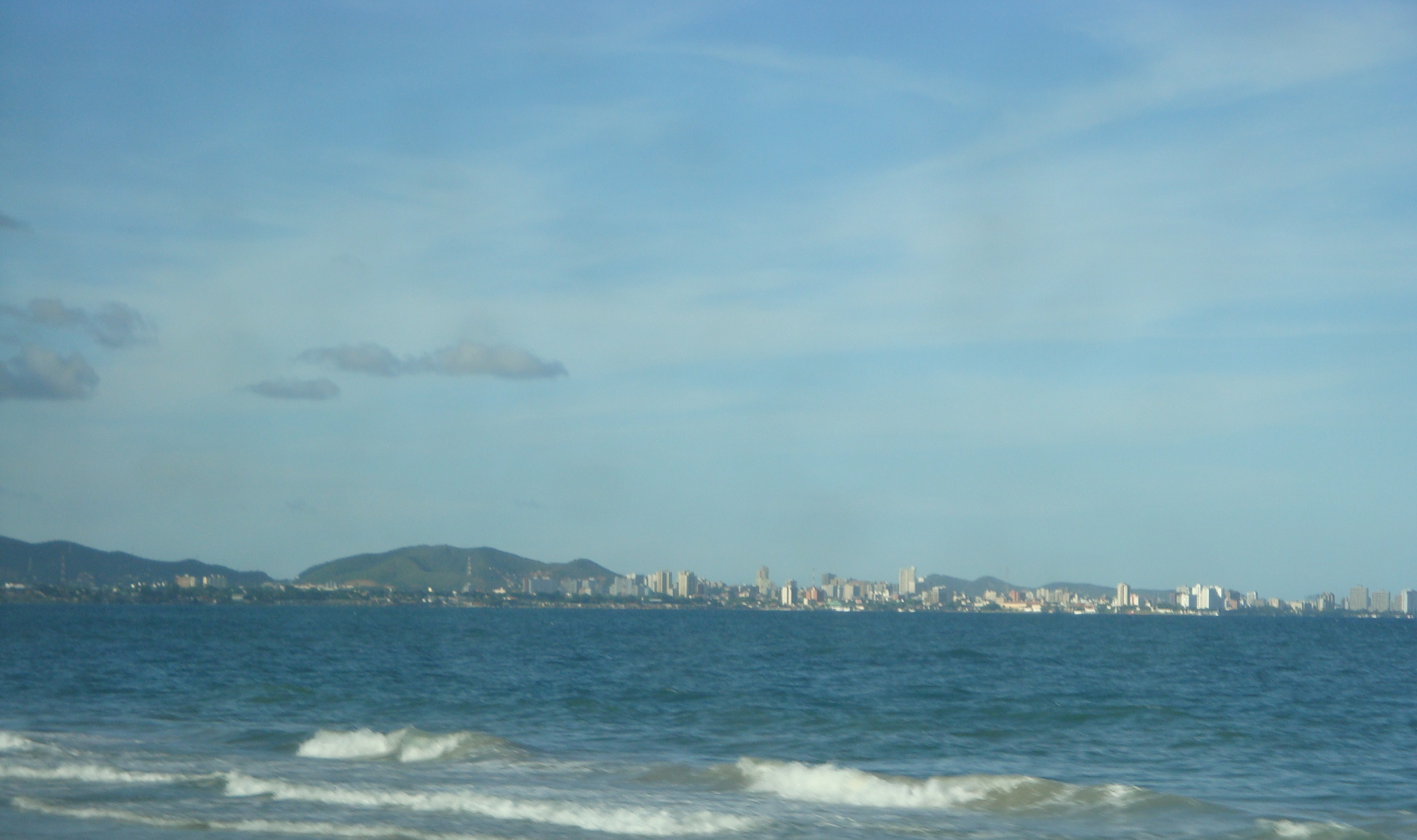
View of Porlamar from Pampatar (Margarita Island).

== Twin cities ==
- Cancún, Mexico
- Cartagena, Colombia
- (United States) Miami, USA

== Notable people ==
- Jihad Ayoub (born 1995), Lebanese footballer

== Works cited ==
=== Books ===
- Dalton, Leonard (1912). Venezuela. Charles Scribner's Sons.
- Kunz, George; Stevenson, Charles (1908). The Book of the Pearl: The History, Art, Science, and Industry of the Queen of Gems. Macmillan Inc.
- Minta, Stephen (1993). Aguirre: The Re-creation of a Sixteenth-Century Journey Across South America. Henry Holt and Company. ISBN 0805031030.

=== Journals ===
- "Sources of Supply of Divi-Divi". Journal of the Royal Society of Arts. 72 (3719). Royal Society of Arts: 254–255. 1924. doi:10.2307/41356486. JSTOR 41356486.

=== News ===
- "Porlamar se prepara con agenda cultural y protocolar para celebrar sus 488 años de Fundación". Diario Caribazo. 2024. Archived from the original on 6 July 2025.
- Isava, Carolina (26 March 2017). "Porlamar, ciudad turística, comercial e inmobiliaria de oriente". Analítica. Archived from the original on 6 July 2025.
- Misra, Leena (2 October 2016). "The Night is Long in Margarita". The Indian Express. Archived from the original on 4 October 2016.
