= San Tomé, Venezuela =

San Tomé
- Location within Venezuela
- Coordinates: 8°56′28″N 64°7′48″W
- Country: Venezuela
- State: Anzoátegui
- Municipality: Pedro María Freites Municipality

Area
  - Total: 8 km^{2} (3.1 sq mi)
- Elevation: 255 m (837 ft)

Population
  - Total: 4,237
- Time zone: UTC-4:00 (VET)
- Climate: Aw

San Tomé is an oil company town, or camp, located about 8 miles (13 km) northeast of the city of El Tigre, in the state of Anzoátegui in Venezuela. The town of San José de Guanipa, also called El Tigrito, lies between El Tigre and San Tomé. San Tomé lies about 60 miles (97 km) north of the Orinoco River, and about 90 miles (140 km) south of Puerto la Cruz and its oil refineries on the Caribbean Sea. San Tomé was originally an American planned community built in the 1930s by and for the Mene Grande Oil Company, a subsidiary of Gulf Oil Corporation. Ownership of San Tomé was assumed by Petróleos de Venezuela, Sociedad Anónima (PDVSA) after the oil industry was nationalized in 1975.

== Geography ==
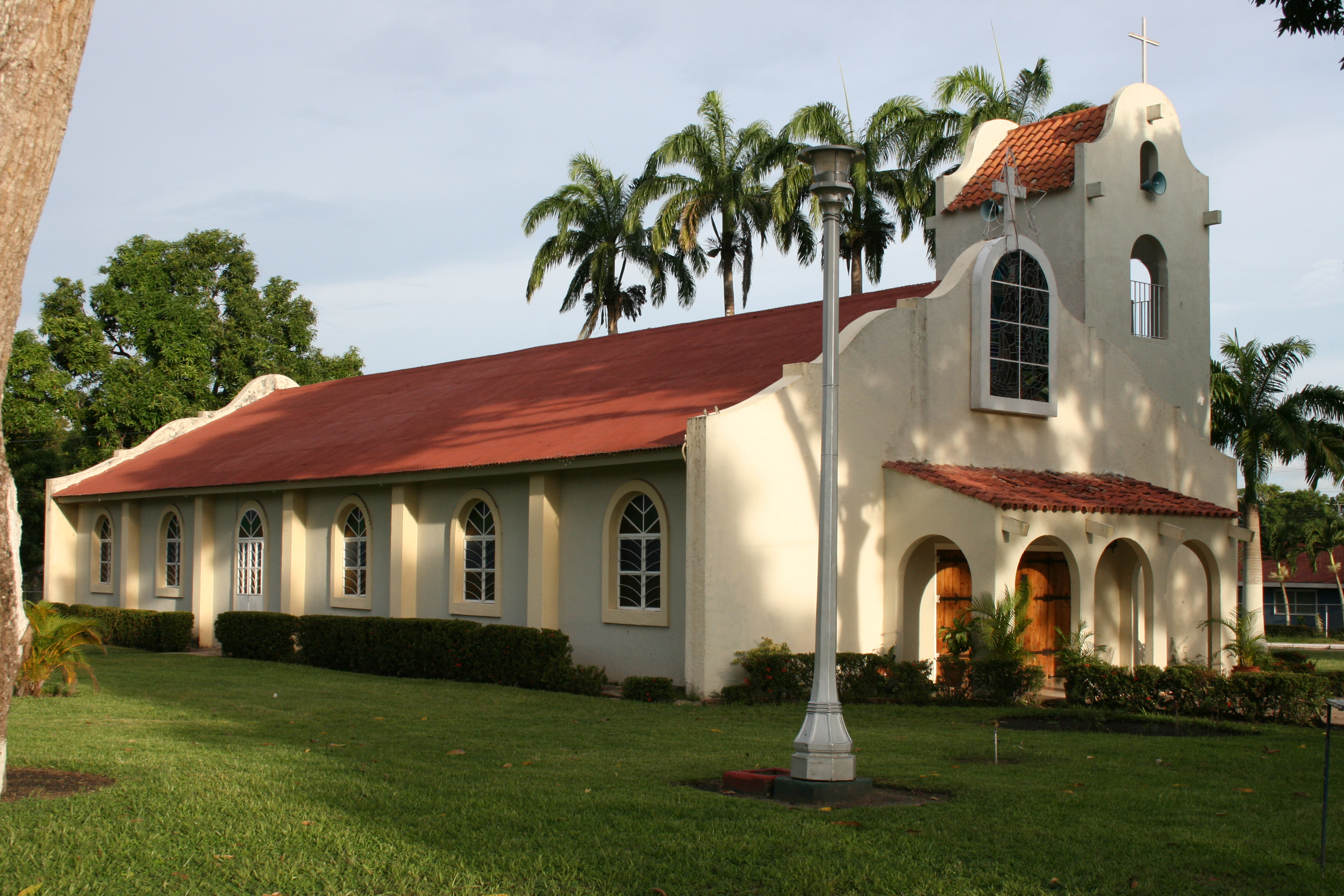
The San Tomé Church, a catholic church, is located in South Camp.

San Tomé is located within the eastern Venezuelan Llanos. It is therefore situated on a flat, open, nearly barren plain; the area is often referred to as the "Mesa de Guanipa" (Table of Guanipa). The elevation of San Tomé is about 835 feet (255 m). The climate is fairly steady year round with high temperatures about 88 °F (31 °C), low temperatures about 70 °F (21 °C), and steady trade winds of about 10 miles per hour (16 km/h) from the east-northeast. Summer is a rainy season with an average of 4 inches (100 mm) to 8 inches (200 mm) of rain per month.

The town of San Tomé is about 1 mile (1.6 km) by 3 miles (4.8 km) in extent, and it consists of two main areas. Campo Norte (North Camp) contains the regional headquarters of Petróleos de Venezuela, Sociedad Anónima (PDVSA), the country's state-owned oil and natural gas company. Homes for company staff are also in North Camp, which is also called Campo Meneven. Campo Sur (South Camp) is a recreational area and includes workers' residences.

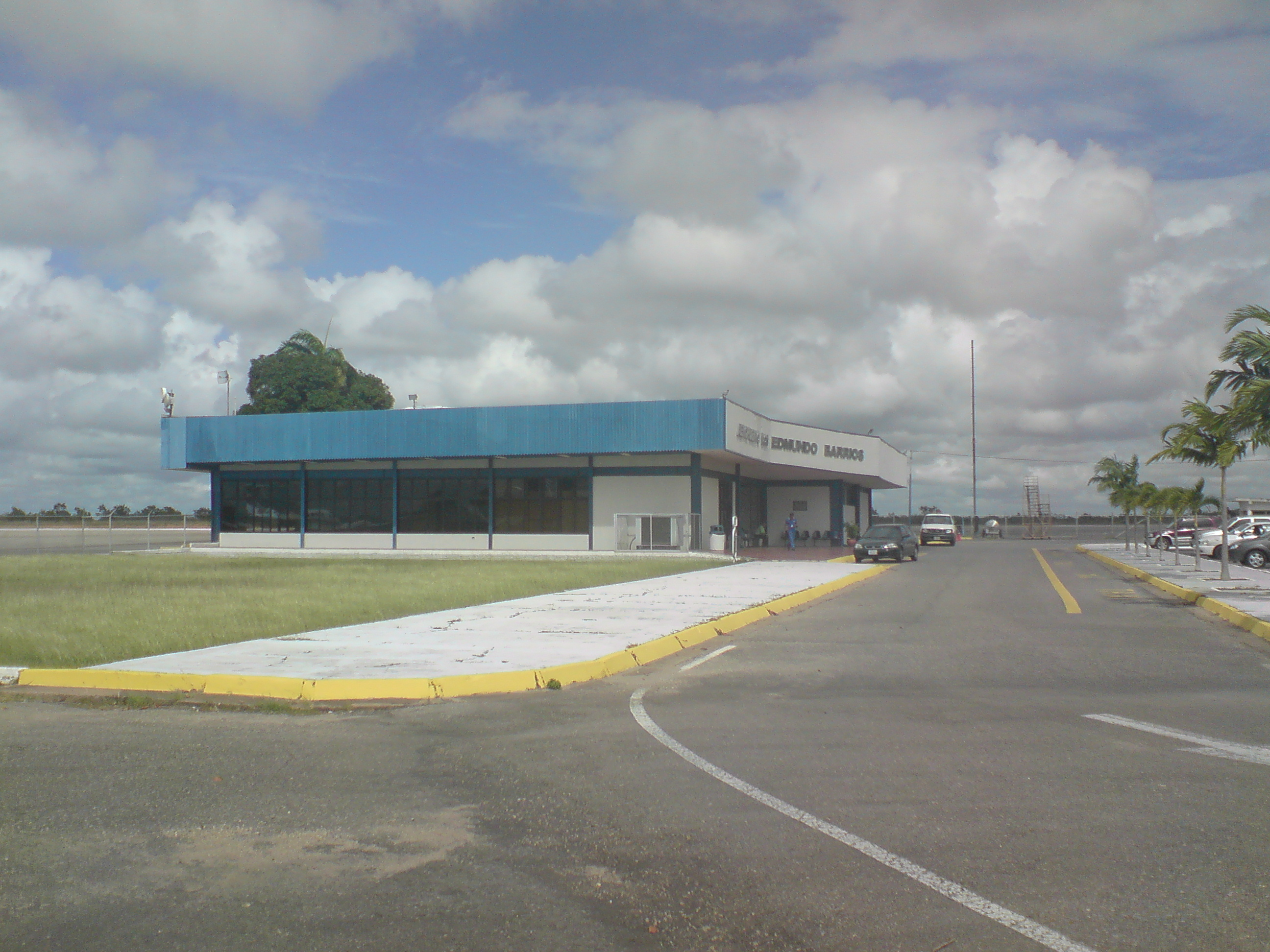
Terminal of San Tomé Don Edmundo Barrios national airport in 2009.

== Transport ==
San Tomé is served by two airports:

- San Tomé Airport (IATA: SOM, ICAO: SVST)
- El Tigre Airport (IATA: ELX)

San Tomé Airport, officially Don Edmundo Barrios Airport is just west of the camp. The airport connects the towns of El Tigre, El Tigrito, and San Tomé to the rest of the country.

The San Tomé-Puerto la Cruz highway connects the town with Puerto la Cruz on the coast. The largest city to the south is Ciudad Bolivar on the Orinoco River.

== Oil ==
The oil concessions for Gulf Oil Corporation in Anzoátegui State were obtained in 1925 from Addison H. McKay, a representative of Sun Oil Company. In 1927 South American Gulf Company, later known as Venezuelan Gulf Company, set up headquarters in Barcelona. It established its first operations in Soledad across the Orinoco River from Ciudad Bolivar. Equipment was shipped in by river. In the 1930s a large field of light crude oil was discovered near El Tigrito by the Mene Grande Oil Company (MGO), a subsidiary of Gulf. The oil discovery led to the founding of El Tigre in 1933. The Oficina No. 1 well, a wildcat well begun in 1933 and completed in 1937, established the highly productive Oficina Formation and caused El Tigre to become a boomtown. The name "Oficina" (Office) was derived from the telegraph office in El Tigrito, and the Greater Oficina Area comprises many oil fields over a large fraction of Anzoátegui State. MGO then transferred it headquarters to El Tigre. By 1938 it began construction of a new company town, San Tome. Operations from the region were consolidated there in 1940. A 65 bed hospital was built in 1941, followed by schools in 1942. This was followed by a Club in 1943, then a Commisary in 1947 and an electric plant in 1948.

Until the oil discovery, the area had been sparsely populated. By 1940 a road and an oil pipeline had been constructed to connect El Tigre with Puerto La Cruz. An oil terminal had also been built by Mene Grande at Puerto la Cruz. By 1946, 512 wells had been drilled, and the region had produced 127 million barrels of oil. This production occurred during World War II, when Venezuela was a major supplier of this critical commodity to the United States. At the price of oil in 1946, this quantity of oil had a value equivalent to $4.128×10^{9} in 2025.

The region just south of San Tomé to the Orinoco River is the "Orinoco Belt", a reserve of heavy crude oil. The oil reserve is the largest in the world. Standard Oil of Venezuela and Mene Grande had explored the area just north of the Orinoco in the 1930s, and had discovered this heavy oil reserve. Early on the oil reserve was recognized to be gigantic, but its oil was so viscous and heavy that it was not commercially viable to produce it until the 1980s. For 40 years the name for the reserve was the "Tar Belt".

Hollis Hedberg, an American geologist and petroleum scientist, was a primary contributor to Mene Grande's discoveries around El Tigre, where he lived from 1937 to 1939. After 1939 until 1946 he was based in San Tomé, where he was in charge of all geological operations in eastern Venezuela for Mene Grande. Hedberg later served as the chief geologist of Gulf Oil Company and was a professor of geology at Princeton University.

== Oil service camp ==
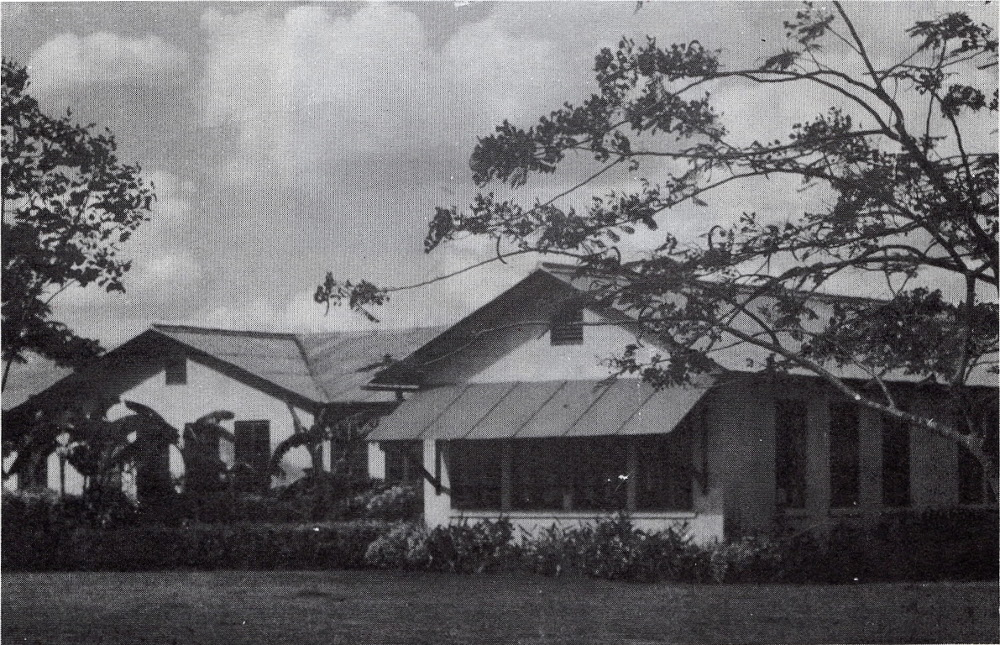
The staff school at San Tomé, Venezuela in 1968.

San Tomé was built as a service camp for Mene Grande in the late 1930s thru the 1950's on the model of a military base. E.E. "Gene" Brossard, the MGO District Manager for Eastern Venezuela, founded the town. The contractor Gustavo A. San Roman constructed it. Henri Pittier, a Swiss botanist, engineer, and teacher supplied some of the trees for the town. North Camp was designed for the American staff and offices of MGO, while South Camp was designed for Venezuelan workers. It had Bachelor Quarters, a Commissary, Mess Hall and Club facilities. Executives lived together on "Jefe Hill." A golf course Campo de Golf San Tomé is located just north of the town, and a school (Kindergarten thru Ninth grade) was built for employee children. For many years the principal landmark of the town was its red and white water tower.

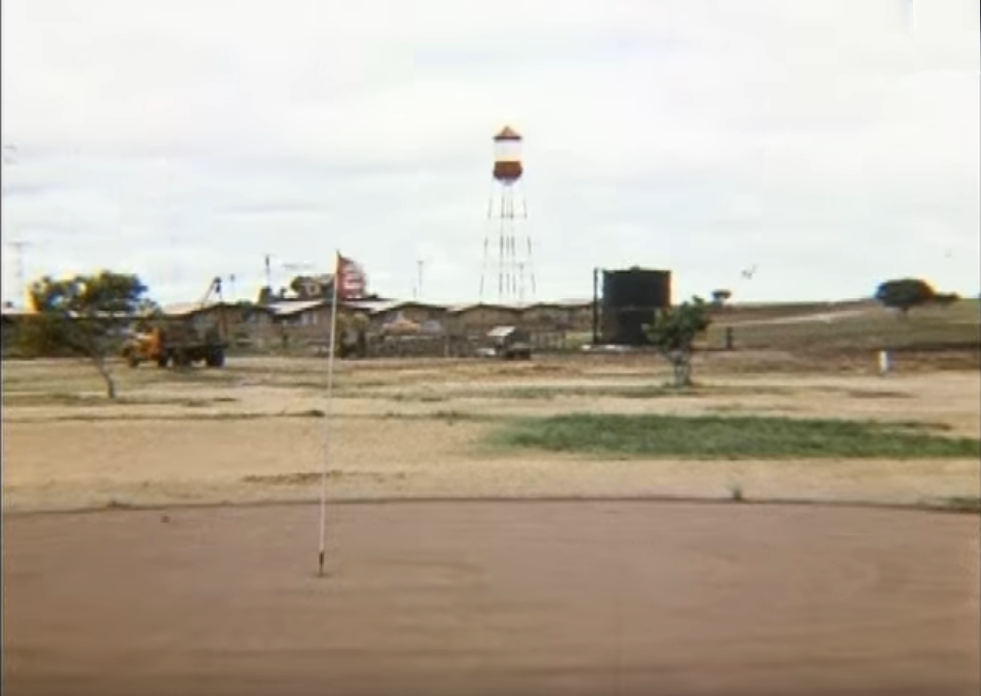
The San Tomé water tower during the 1950s. The flag in front is the number 2 hole of the camp golf course.

Gene Brossard's daughter, Emma Brossard, was a San Tomé resident, attending primary school there after 1940, then returning after college graduation in 1950 to work for MGO and raise her family. She wrote her undergraduate dissertation on The Mene Grande Oil Company of Venezuela. E. Brossard became a noted petroleum historian and industry expert, particularly on the Venezuelan oil industry. In 1946 there were 800 residents at San Tomé, while in 1955 about 300 Americans and others worked at San Tomé.

After Venezuela nationalized the oil industry in 1975, PDVSA assumed ownership of San Tomé. The town was a thriving business center because of PDVSA. When Hugo Chávez came to power in 1999, he started directing PDVSA and effectively turned it into a direct government arm whose profits would be injected into social spending. Emma Brossard commented in 2005, "Venezuelan oil fields had a depletion rate of 25 per cent annually [and] there had to be an investment of US$3.4 billion a year to keep up its production." "But since Chavez has become president there has been no investment." On 18 September 2006 Venezuela's President Hugo Chávez and Iran's President Mahmoud Ahmadinejad inaugurated a joint oil drilling operation with PDVSA and Iran's Petropars in San Tomé.

By 2018 the political and economic troubles facing Venezuela had engulfed the El Tigre-San Tomé region. Oil workers fled the state-owned oil company when their salaries could not keep up with hyperinflation, reducing families to starvation. Workers and criminals stripped vital oil industry equipment of anything of valuable, ranging from pickup trucks to the copper wire of critical oil production components. Oil facilities were neglected and unprotected, leading to diminishing oil production and environmental damage.

== Anzoátegui campus of UNEFA ==
The Anzoátegui campus of "La Universidad Nacional Experimental Politécnica de la Fuerza Armada Bolivariana" (The National Experimental Polytechnical University of the Bolivarian Armed Forces) (UNEFA) is located at San Tomé. The campus, one of 61 of the national system and which is located just south of South Camp, offers a free education in a variety of career options. Founded in 2002, UNEFA Anzoátegui has a student body of 1500 students.

== Notable people ==
- Emma Brossard (1928–2007), American professor of politics and government at the Louisiana State University
- Andrew Divoff (1955–), American actor and producer.
- Juan Chacín Guzmán, president of Petroleos de Venezuela
- Jaime Lusinchi, a medical doctor at the San Tomé hospital around 1949 and who became president of Venezuela (1984-1989).
- Mariem Velazco, a beauty queen crowned Miss International 2018 became the eighth Venezuelan to win the title.
- Edward B. Walker III, became the president and chief operating officer for Gulf Oil Corporation.

== See also ==
- Carabobo Field
- Anaco, Venezuela
- Chimire, Venezuela

== Bibliography ==
- H. D. Hedberg, L.C. Sass, H.J. Funkhouser (1947). Oil Fields of Greater Oficina Area Central Anzoategui, Venezuela. AAPG Bulletin. 31 (12): 2089–2169.
- E. B. Brossard (1993). Petroleum research and Venezuela's INTEVEP: The Clash of the Giants. PennWell Books/INTEVEP, 211 pp. ISBN 978-0-87814-399-3.
