= Chimire, Venezuela =

Cliff landscape in Anzoategui, Venezuela

Coordinates: 9.024912°N 64.271129°W

Chimire, Venezuela, often referred to as the Chimire cliffs (Spanish: Farallones de Chimire), is a semi-mountainous cliff landscape in Mesa de Guanipa, Anzoategui, Venezuela, located a few kilometres north of the city of El Tigre (The Tiger), in the municipality of Freites. Chimire is located about 10 miles (16 km) north of San Tomé on the road to Puerto La Cruz, Venezuela. The cliffs are a tourist destination.

The area has an abundance of natural resources and nutrient-rich soil. A large oil field, the Chimire Field, was discovered there in 1948. The area has good transport links and includes Cerro Negro de Kariñas, the location of the indigenous people in the Anzoategui State. An estimated 2,000 people live in the region. Both vegetation and wildlife are abundant. Cities, towns and places near Chimire include San Tomé, San José de Guanipa (El Tigrito), and El Tigre to the south and Anaco to the north.

== The Chimire Cliffs ==
These mountains consist of reddish, eroded, clay walls. Many tourists, geologists and other scientific researchers interested in the soil and geographical formations visit the area. The region is characterized by the inclines of the cracked walls and slopes, which range from 20% to 90%. Chimire covers around is about 2,000 acres (810 ha); the cliffs were formed by the erosive power of the constant rain in the area. Some cliff are 30 meters (98 ft) high. The formations are a sandy base of multiple shades of yellow and red, a single reddish color layer and other crushed sediment, forming distinct bands in vibrant shades. Wind and rain continue to sculpt the clay towers.

== Origin and geology ==
Alexander von Humboldt speculated that a sea platform covered the landmass of Venezuela to Paraguay during the lower and upper Cretaceous periods. The existence of shell in the area supports this theory. The geographer Paul Kamen Key Vila said a large river existed in north-central Venezuela during the Cretaceous periods. Chimire field consists of coarse sands, gravels and hard clay, varying from red to almost orange conglomerate, yellowish-white, reds and purples and also contains discontinuous lenses of fine sandy clay and silt lenses.

== Oil ==
The Socony-Vacuum Oil Company of Venezuela discovered the Chimire oil field in January, 1948. Initial exploration of the reserve indicated an ultimate oil production in excess of 150 million barrels.

== Sports ==
Chimire has hosted motocross since 2013. Fun Race 4x4, a rally for off-road vehicles, visits the area.
