= San Tomé Airport =

San Tomé Airport Aeropuerto Don Edmundo Barrios
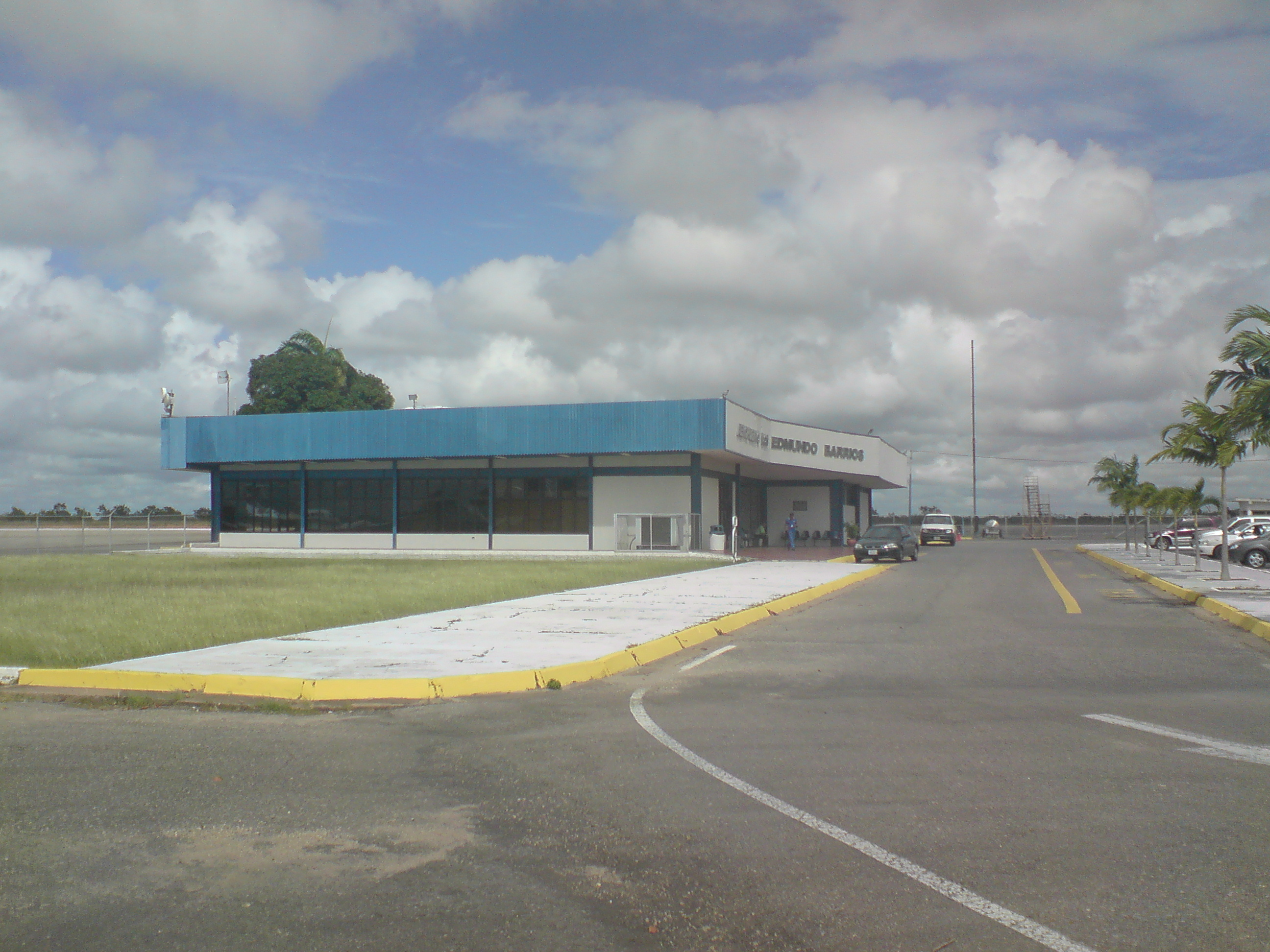
- IATA: SOM; ICAO: SVST

Summary
- Airport type: Public
- Serves: El Tigre, Venezuela
- Location: San Tomé
- Elevation AMSL: 866 ft (264 m)
- Coordinates: 8°56′45″N 64°09′00″W

Map
- Location of airport in Venezuela

Runways
Direction	Length		Surface
Direction	m	ft	Surface
08/26	1,920	6,299	Asphalt
- Sources: WAD GCM Google Maps

San Tomé Airport (IATA: SOM, ICAO: SVST) is an airport at the town of San Tomé, in the Venezuelan state of Anzoátegui. It is also known as Don Edmundo Barrios Airport (Spanish: Aeropuerto Don Edmundo Barrios) after journalist Edmundo Barrios, the founder of the weekly Antorcha. It also serves the cities of El Tigre and San José de Guanipa, located 9 kilometres (5.6 mi) southwest of San Tomé.

== Airlines and destinations ==
Airlines	Destinations
Conviasa	Barcelona (VE)

== See also ==
- Transport in Venezuela
- List of airports in Venezuela
- El Tigre Airport
