= El Tigre =

- City
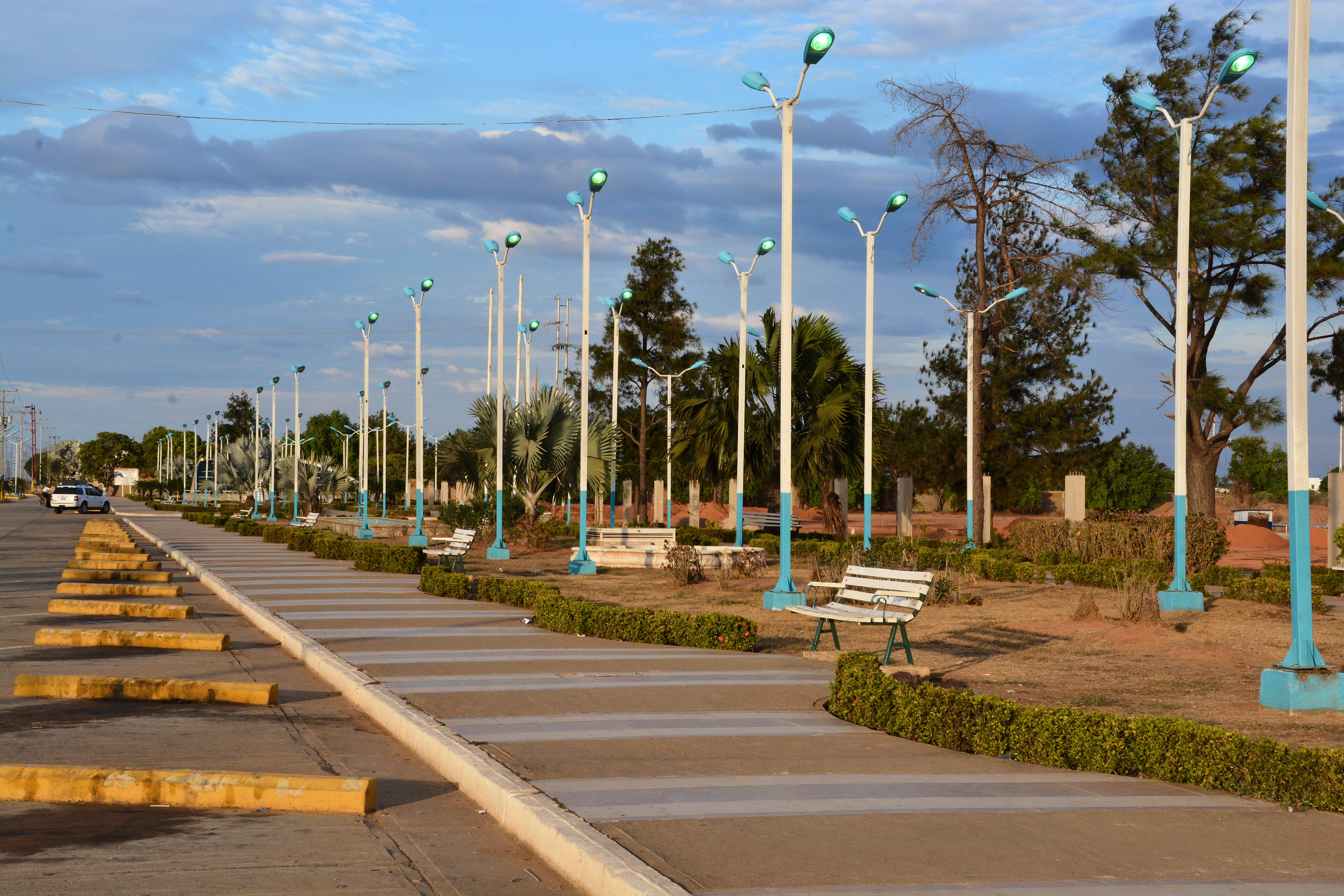
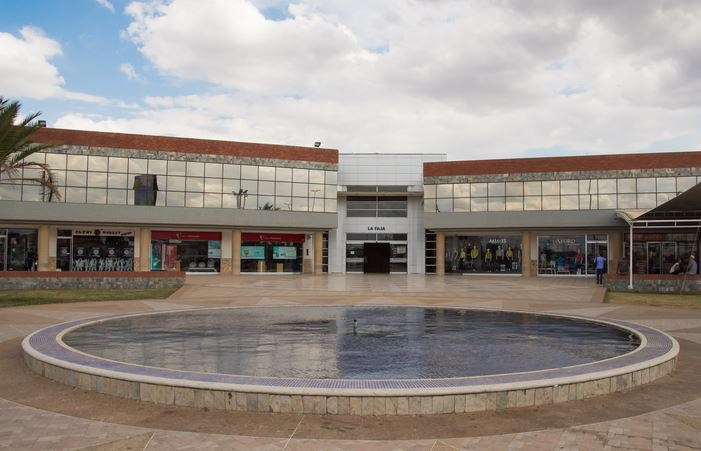
- Boulevard "Paseo La Virgen" and San Remo Mall

- Flag Coat of arms
- Nickname: "southern crossroads" (Español: "Encrucijada del Sur" )
- Location within Venezuela
- Coordinates: 08°53′10″N 64°15′40″W
- Country: Venezuela
- State: Anzoátegui
- Municipality: Simón Rodríguez
- Founded: February 23, 1933

Government
  - Mayor: Alberto Gago Betancourt (PSUV)

Area
  - Total: 35 km^{2} (14 sq mi)
- Elevation: 265 m (869 ft)

Population (2019)
  - Total: 215,800
  - Density: 6,200/km^{2} (16,000/sq mi)
  - Demonym: Tigrense
- Time zone: UTC−4 (VET)
- Postal code: 6050
- Area code: 0283
- Climate: Aw
- Website: www.eltigre.gob.ve
- The area and population figures are for the municipality

El Tigre is a city in Anzoategui, Venezuela. Located in what is called the "Guanipa Mesa", a river (Tigre) runs across the city. The average temperature is 79 °F, all year around, and the annual average rainfall is 1,200mm. One nearby tourist destination is the Chimire Cliffs.

El Tigre also is in full conurbation with the city of San Jose de Guanipa also known as El Tigrito, capital of the Guanipa Municipality whose population according to data from the CNE is 84,526 inhabitants. Both cities are basically one, whose population would be 291,472 inhabitants.

Since the appointment of Orinoco Belt as one of the largest reserves of oil in the world, El Tigre has gained attention as it is very near or on the edge of this oil belt in Anzoategui state. Thus, El Tigre currently shows an increase in the establishment of companies of services to the oil industry that is constantly growing and have also been presented construction projects for new shopping malls, business buildings or towers and other works for the activation of tourism.

== History ==
In the 1930s a large field of light crude oil was discovered near El Tigrito by the Mene Grande Oil Company (MGO), a subsidiary of Gulf Oil Corporation. The Oficina No. 1 well, a wildcat well begun in 1933 and completed in 1937, established the highly productive Oficina Formation. The oil discovery led to the founding of El Tigre on February 23, 1933 when Mene Grande established their offices in Campo Oficina. El Tigre quickly became a boomtown. The name "Oficina" (Office) was derived from the telegraph office in El Tigrito. Until the oil discovery, the area had been sparsely populated. By 1940 a road and an oil pipeline had been constructed to connect El Tigre with Puerto La Cruz. By 1946, 512 wells had been drilled, and the region had produced 127 million barrels of oil. The nearby oil company camp San Tomé was built near El Tigre as the main camp for Mene Grande.

== Demographics ==
The Simón Rodríguez Municipality, according to the 2011 Venezuelan census, has a population of 194,858 inhabitants (went up from 155,178 in 2000). This amounts to 12.4% of Anzoátegui's population.

== Geography ==
=== Limits ===
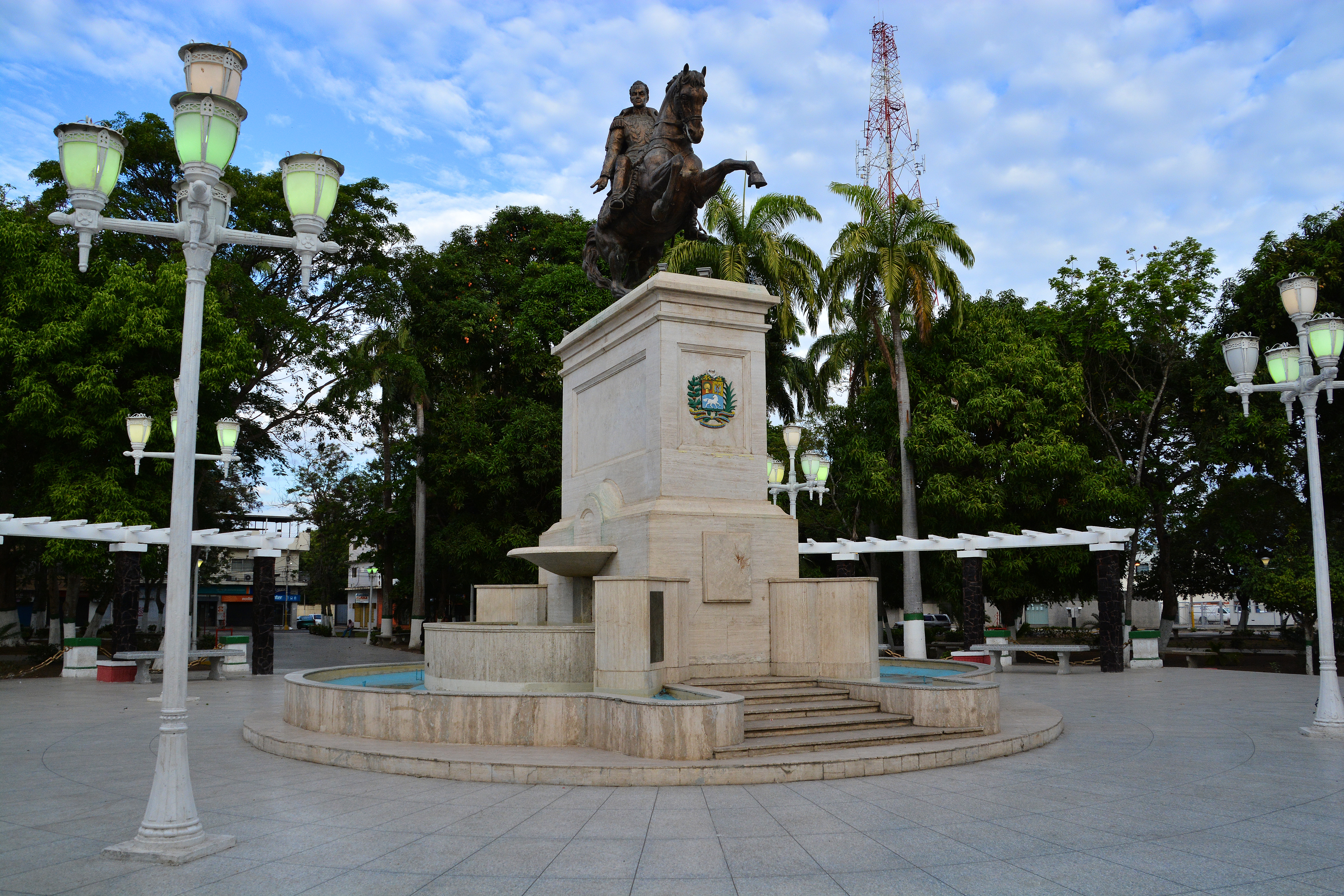
Bolívar Square in El Tigre.

About the territorial extension of the municipality in which the city is located, it is 702 km2 and delimited by the following territories:

Northeast: borders the municipalities Pedro Maria Freites and Guanipa. South: bordering the municipality Francisco de Miranda. East: borders the municipality Guanipa. West: bordering the municipality Francisco de Miranda. Southeast: municipalities bordering Guanipa and Independencia.

=== Climate ===
The climate is of savannah and temperatures ranging between 68 °F (20 degrees C) and 96.8 °F (37 degrees C), with an average of 80.6 °F (27 degrees C) approximately.

== Media ==
=== Radio ===
La Voz de EL Tigre it was the first radio station in amplitude modulated (AM) installed in the city, by Don Carlos Poleo, January 9, 1948.

- Radio Fe y Alegría 940 AM

With the development of the frequency modulation (FM) are many radio stations that have been installed, among the most representative.

- Mundo Radio 88.9 FM
- VenFM 98.9 FM
- Chimire 105.5 FM
- Radio Fe y Alegría 91.7 FM
- Orbita 97.3 FM
- Tigresa 100.1 FM
- Eclipse 90.1 FM
- Xtrema 99.7 FM
- Ídolos 96.9 FM
- Clásicos 90.9 FM
- Eco 92.1 FM
- Turpial 107.1 FM
- Fuego 89.5 FM
- Mariana Radio "La Catolica" 100.7

== Local economy ==
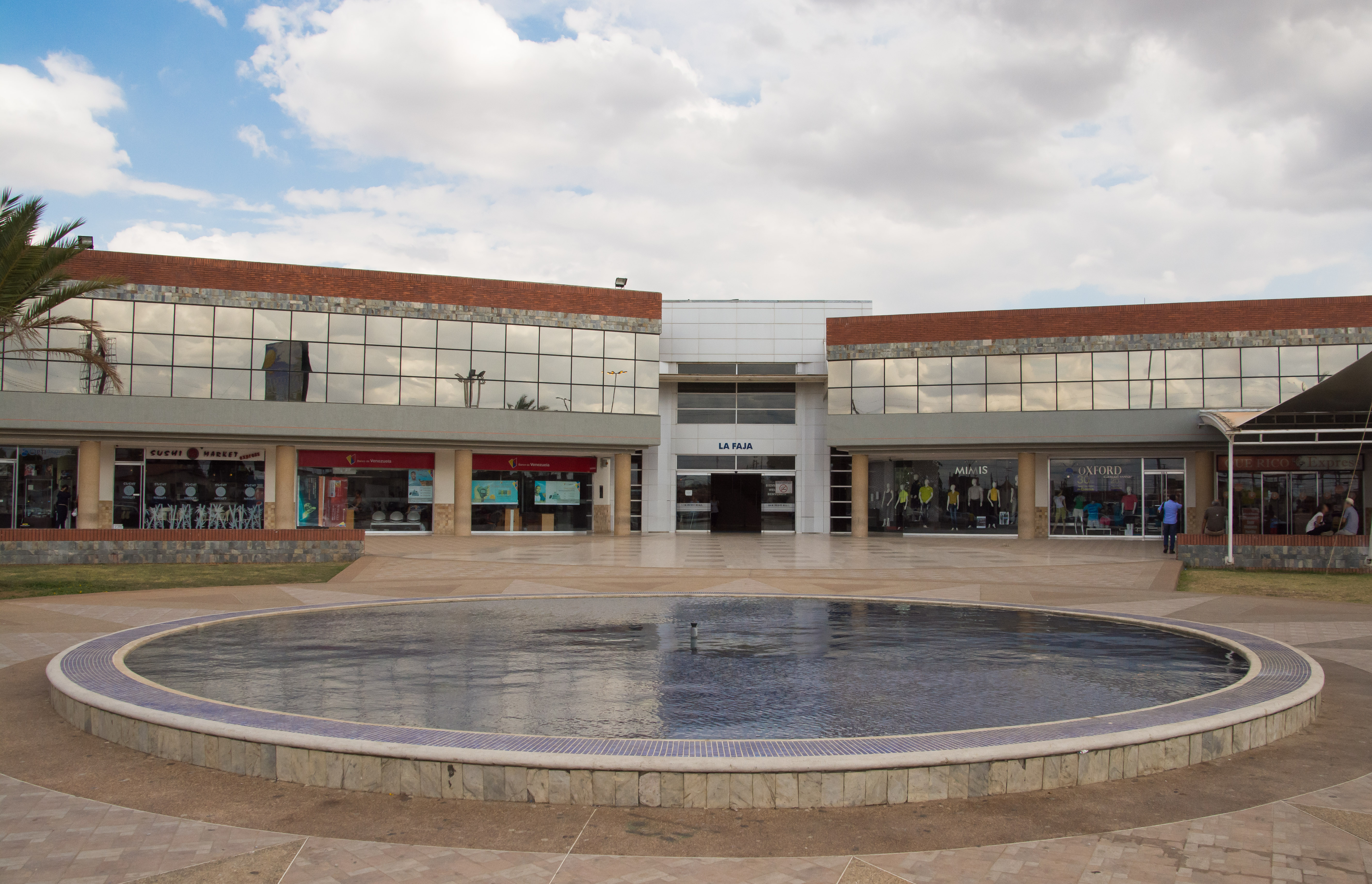
San Remo Mall.

=== Hotels ===
- Hotel Green Park
- Hotel Internacional Gran Hotel
- Hotel Mancora Suites & Hotel
- Hotel Santa Cruz
- Hotel Gemstone Inn
- Hotel Orinoco
- Hotel La Redoma
- Hotel Suites & Hotel
- Hotel Tamanaco
- Hotel La Carreta del Tigre
- Hotel Palma Real
- Hotel Luxor
- Hotel Cel (Centro Empresarial Longo)
- Hotel Erobuiling Express El Tigre
- Hotel La Fuente
- Hotel Las Tinajas
- Hotel Reina Margot
- Hotel Villa Dorada
- Hotel La Posada del Angel
- Hotel Bella Vista Suite
- Hotel Caribbean Beach
- Hotel Amadeus
- Hotel Don Pepe
- Hotel Arichuna

=== Malls ===
- San Remo Mall
- Unimall
- Marmoto´S
- Petrucci
- Plaza Medina
- Las Virtudes
- Alba
- Paseo los Pinos
- Galerias Agua Miel
- Harris
- Venezuela
- El Coloso
- Madrid
- Paris
- Pequeños Comerciantes
- Hana
- Díaz

== Main Streets and Avenues ==
- Ave. España (Troncal Km 16)
- Ave. Rotaria (Troncal Km 16)
- Ave. Peñalver
- Ave. Jesús Subero
- Ave. Carretera Negra
- Ave. Norte (Troncal Km 15)
- Ave. Francisco de Miranda
- Ave. 5
- Ave. Libertador
- Ave. Intercomunal
- St. Bolívar
- St. Miranda
- St. Brasil
- St. Anzoátegui
- St. Ayacucho

== Main Squares and Phials ==
- Plaza Bolívar
- Plaza El Libro
- Plaza Revenga
- Plaza La Patilla
- Plaza Augusto Ramirez
- Plaza José Antonio Anzoátegui
- Plaza de Estudiantes
- Plaza España.
- Redoma de Aguanca
- Redoma Cruz de los Choferes
- Bulevar José Gregorio Hernández
- El Paseo de La Virgen

== Government ==
El Tigre is the shire town of the Simón Rodríguez Municipality in Anzoátegui. The mayor of the Simón Rodríguez Municipality is Ernesto Raydan, elected in 2017 with 51.95% of the votes.

=== Main roads to other cities ===
- National Trunk Highway Km 15 (Saint Joseph, El Tigre, Pariaguán).
- National Trunk Highway Km 16 (Cantaura, El Tigre, Ciudad Bolivar).
- Regional Road (El Tigre – Atapirire)

== Notable people ==
- Ricardo Martins, footballer who plays for Deportivo Anzoátegui as a midfielder
- Jose Bonilla (boxer), former World Boxing Association (WBA) flyweight (112 lb) champion.
- José Catire Carpio, (December 19, 1940 – June 26, 2006), was a Venezuelan llanero singer.
- Jean Machi, major league baseball pitcher.
- José Tábata, outfielder for the Pittsburgh Pirates
- Luis Aponte (Boston Red Sox)
- Enzo Hernández Professional baseball player, shortstop, Padres de San Diego 71–77 y Dodgers de Los Ángeles 78

== Transportation ==
- El Tigre is served by San Tomé Airport (IATA: SOM, ICAO: SVST).
- Passenger Terminal Cleto Quijada
