= Emma Brossard =

American academic, political scientist

- Brossard in 1979.
- Born: October 1, 1928; Santurce, San Juan, Puerto Rico, U.S.
- Died: November 15, 2007 (aged 79); North Palm Beach, Florida
- Occupation: Oil industry analyst
- Children: 3

Academic background
- Education: University of Wisconsin at Madison (B.A.); Claremont Graduate University (M.A., Ph.D.)
- Thesis: Rómulo Betancourt: A Study in the Evolution of a Constitutional Statesman (1971)

Academic work
- Discipline: politics, government
- Institutions: Hillsdale College, Michigan; University of West Florida, Pensacola; Louisiana State University, Baton Rouge

Emma Beatriz Brossard (October 1, 1928 – November 15, 2007) was an American professor of politics and government at the Louisiana State University at Baton Rouge and noted expert on the Venezuelan oil industry. She authored four monographs on the Venezuelan oil industry and its history. She was known for her criticisms of the Hugo Chavez administration and its policies in governing the Venezuelan oil company Petróleos de Venezuela, Sociedad Anónima (PDVSA).

== Early life and education ==
Emma Beatriz Brossard y Jacobsen was born on October 1, 1928, in Santurce, San Juan, Puerto Rico. Her mother, Alice Thelma Jacobsen was of Danish and Venezuelan descent. Her father, Eugene Eduard "Gene" Brossard, was a lawyer and former Attorney General of the State of Wisconsin. Gene Brossard was the District Manager for Eastern Venezuela for the Mene Grande Oil Company, a subsidiary of Gulf Oil Corporation. A pilot, he mapped much of Venezuela from the air for oil exploration. Through her father, Emma Brossard had an early introduction to the Venezuelan oil industry. Indeed, she was raised in Venezuela, her great-great-grandfather started the first oil company in Venezuela in 1878, and when Gene Brossard founded Mene Grande's oil camp San Tomé, Venezuela in 1940, the family moved there.

Brossard received her Bachelor of Arts degree from University of Wisconsin at Madison in 1950, writing a dissertation on The Mene Grande Oil Company of Venezuela. After graduation, she worked for Mene Grande in San Tomé, Venezuela. On 21 November 1951, Brossard married law student, George I. Peterson at St. Raphael's Cathedral in Madison, Wisconsin. Brossard and Peterson had three sons, all born in Venezuela.

Brossard continued her education at Claremont Graduate University (CGU), earning an Education Certificate and a master's degree in government in 1968. Her master's thesis was titled The Military Government of Marcos Pérez Jiménez. She received her doctorate in political science from CGU in 1971, writing her dissertation on Rómulo Betancourt, a former president of Venezuela. Part of her research for her doctoral dissertation included an interview with Rómulo Betancourt in 1970, of which there is an audio recording.

== Academic career ==
From 1970 she served as chair of the political science department at St. Norbert College in De Pere, Wisconsin. In 1973, she was hired as the assistant to the president at Hillsdale College in Michigan and from 1973 to 1975 she taught there as well. From 1975 to 1982 she was visiting professor, and then associate professor of government, University of West Florida, Pensacola. From 1982 until the end of her academic career in 1991, she was associate professor of government, Louisiana State University at Baton Rouge and served as the director of the policy analysis and planning division of the Center for Energy Studies.

== Brossard Petroleum Consultants ==
With her expertise in the Venezuelan oil industry, Brossard formed the Houston-based Brossard Petroleum Consultants, a firm that advised the Venezuelan petroleum industry. Brossard's opinions on events in the oil industry, particularly those involving Venezuela, were often quoted in the media.

== Criticism of Chavez over oil industry ==
Brossard was an early critic of the oil policies of the president of Venezuela Hugo Chavez and its management of PDVSA. Often writing in Spanish, she argued that President Chavez was destroying the Venezuelan oil industry. Brossard stated in 2005, "Venezuelan oil fields had a depletion rate of 25 per cent annually [and] there had to be an investment of US$3.4 billion a year to keep up its production." "But since Chavez has become president there has been no investment." Brossard further commented that corruption was "phenomenal" in Venezuela, as Chavez and his government spent millions on themselves and thousands of businesses have been closed down.

== Death and legacy ==
Brossard died on November 15, 2007, in North Palm Beach, Florida and was buried in her family's cemetery plot at St. Jerome's Catholic Cemetery, in Columbus, Wisconsin. She was recognized as an "authority on the international oil trade."

== Books ==
- E.B. Brossard (1983). Petroleum--Politics and Power. PennWell Books, 254 pp. ISBN 978-0-87814-224-8.
- E.B. Brossard (1993). Petroleum research and Venezuela's INTEVEP: The Clash of the Giants. PennWell Books/INTEVEP, 211 pp. ISBN 978-0-87814-399-3.
- E.B. Brossard (1994). (in Spanish) Ruta Y Destino De La Investigacion Petrolera En Venezuela. INTEVEP, 314 pp. ISBN 978-9802596447.
- E.B. Brossard (2001). Power and Petroleum, Venezuela, Cuba and Colombia: A Troika? BookMasters, Inc., 254 pp. ISBN 978-0-96322-616-7
