= Anaco Airport =

Airport in Venezuela

Anaco Airport Aeropuerto de Anaco
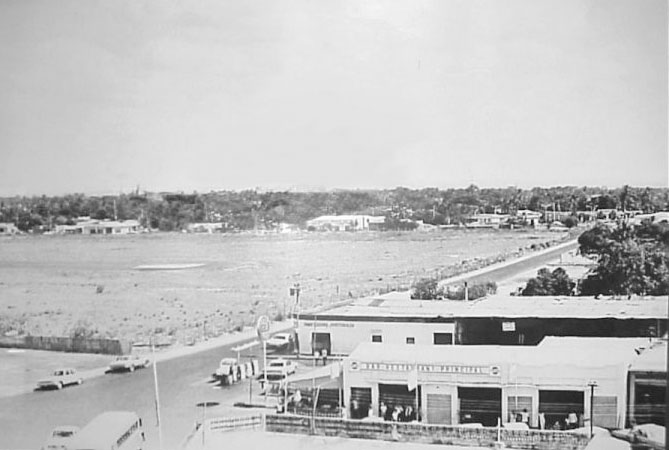
- IATA: AAO; ICAO: SVAN

Summary
- Airport type: Public
- Operator: Government
- Serves: Anaco, Venezuela
- Elevation AMSL: 721 ft (220 m)
- Coordinates: 9°25′49″N 64°28′15″W

Map
- Location of the airport in Venezuela

Runways
Direction	Length		Surface
Direction	m	ft	Surface
10/28	1,260	4,134	Asphalt
- Source: WAD GCM Google Maps

Anaco Airport (Spanish: Aeropuerto de Anaco) (IATA: AAO, ICAO: SVAN), is an airport serving Anaco, a city in the Anzoátegui state of Venezuela. The runway length includes a 59 metres (194 ft) displaced threshold on Runway 10.

== See also ==
- Transport in Venezuela
- List of airports in Venezuela
