= Carabobo Field =

Oil field in Venezuela

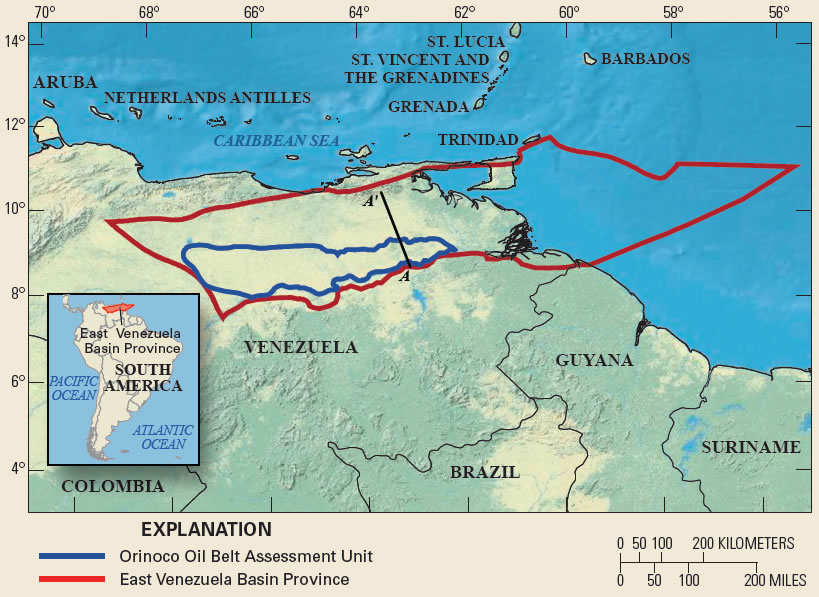
The location of the Orinoco Oil Belt (blue) with respect to the East Venezuela Basin (red)

Carabobo is an oil field located in Venezuela's Orinoco Belt. As one of the world's largest accumulations of recoverable oil, the recent discoveries in the Orinoco Belt have led to Venezuela holding the world's largest recoverable reserves in the world, surpassing Saudi Arabia in July 2010. The Carabobo oil field is majority owned by Venezuela's national oil company, Petroleos de Venezuela SA (PDVSA). Owning the majority of the Orinoco Belt, and its estimated 1.18 trillion barrels of oil in place, PDVSA is now the fourth largest oil company in the world. The field is well known for its extra Heavy crude oils, having an average specific gravity between 4 and 16 °API. The Orinoco Belt holds 90% of the world's extra heavy crude oils, estimated at 256 billion recoverable barrels. While production is in its early development, the Carabobo field is expected to produce 400,000 barrels of oil per day.

== History ==
Despite no surface indications of petroleum, exploration led to a discovery well drilled in 1936, 25 miles north-northwest of Ciudad Bolivar. Drilled to a depth of 3,855 feet, 7 °API gravity oil was discovered in the Miocene tar sands. Nine months later, oil was struck again, this time in the current Giant Temblador field, 93 miles east-northeast. Preliminary exploration ended in 1967, and in 1987, Venezuelan consultant Anibal Martinez determined that the belt extends 285 miles westwards from Puerto Ordaz. Four fields were proposed from the six main producing areas in the belt. Venezuelan President Hugo Chavez's administration named the four fields from west to east; Boyacá, Junin, Ayacucho, and Carabobo, with 36 licensing blocks.

In 2010, the Carabobo field was split into three joint venture projects; Carabobo-1, Carabobo-2, and Carabobo-3.

Due to the nature of extra heavy crudes, the oil produced from the Carabobo field has extremely high viscosities. Typical heavy crudes produced are around 10,000 cp, which is the viscosity of corn syrup. Recoveries in this area are naturally very low. As a result, emerging technologies have recently made recoveries high enough to produce the extra heavy crudes economically. Specifically, enhanced oil recovery methods have dramatically improved recoveries. Methods such as immiscible gas injection, polymer flooding, and in situ combustion, better known as fireflooding, have all seen limited success in the Carabobo field. However, steam injection and microbial enhanced oil recovery (MEOR) have seen the most success.

Microbial enhanced oil recovery, specifically, has received special attention. In 1999, Bognolo reported that biosurfactants not only reduced the viscosity of the Venezuelan heavy crude oils, but also increased their mobility in transport lines. Currently, the biodegradation of the heavy crudes has become an integral tertiary recovery method in the field, as it is a cost-efficient and eco-friendly way to drive the residual oil trapped in the reservoirs.

== Geology ==
Carabobo is one of the four fields in the Orinoco Oil Belt. Located on the southern border of the East Venezuela Basin, the Orinoco Oil Belt extends 375 miles along the Orinoco River in the eastern part of Venezuela. The East Venezuela Basin is a foreland basin south of a fold belt formed from the progressive collision of the Caribbean Plate and the passive margin of northern South America. Thrust faults associated with the fold belt resulted in the burial of Cretaceous and possibly older source rocks into the thermal window for oil.

The Orinoco oil belt has many unique features from a geological point of view. All of these unique features are related to the tectonic events that formed the field. This deposition includes the Querecual and San Antonio formations that would become source rocks for the Orinoco Oil Belt.

While the Guyana shield underwent erosion, the sediments were continually deposited in the East Venezuela Basin. This led to the burial of the Querecual and San Antonio formations, pushing them into the thermal window for oil.

=== Stratigraphy ===
Below is a figure of the stratigraphy of the Carabobo field. Three periods of deposition are prevalent, including the formation of the source rocks, reservoir rocks and seal. Faulting from the thrust belts are found throughout the field, and are known to trap oil. However, most of the oil can be found in the Miocene sandstones that are sealed by the Miocene mudstones and Guyana Shield.

The source rocks, the Querecual and San Antonio formations, were formed in the Upper Cretaceous, and were organically rich. After burial, these source rocks were pushed into the thermal window for oil, and began to migrate updip into the Miocene sandstones.

A stratigraphic pinch out of the Miocene Oficina formation sandstones against the Miocene Carapita mudstones created a trap for the oil of the Orinoco Belt to migrate updip from the deeper basin. A classic example of long distance migration, the oil from the Upper Cretaceous Querecual formation source rock travelled about 300 kilometers.

In the Carabobo field, the reservoir tar sands are characterized by several depositional sequences of Miocene sandstones and mudstones. The reservoirs consist of the Oficina, Freites, and Merecure formations. Faulting and shale dispersion is common in these formations, leading to severe heterogeneity. This heterogeneity in the reservoirs severely reduce recovery efficiency in the field. Reservoirs have an average thickness of 60 meters and range in depth from 150 to 1,400 meters.

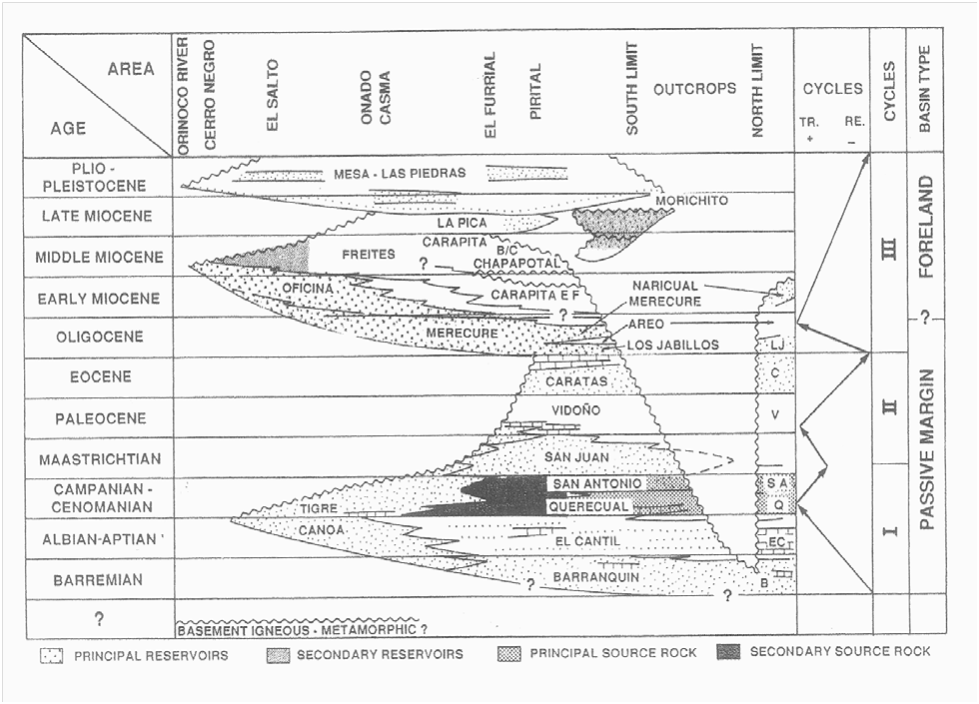
Figure 2 Stratigraphy of the Orinoco Oil Belt

=== Source rock ===
The main source rocks for the Carabobo field are the Upper Cretaceous Querecual formation and San Antonio formation.

=== Reservoir rock ===
The oil in the Carabobo field resides in the Oficina, Freites and Merecure sandstone formations. Formed in the Miocene era, these formations consist mostly of sands formed by the erosion of the uplifted Guyana Shield. The sands were carried along north flowing rivers of the time period and deposited on the southern margin of the East Venezuela Basin. Stratigraphically trapped, the reservoir contains extra heavy oil with an average gravity from 4 to 16 °API.

=== Trap and seal ===
The Oficina reservoir rocks are trapped by a stratigraphic pinch-out with the Guyana Shield. Faulting is prevalent in the field, and known to occasionally trap oil.

=== Fluid migration ===
The Querecual is believed to have matured during the Oligocene (~33.9 to 23 million years ago), proceeding from north to south. During the fluid migration, the oil produced from the Upper Cretaceous Querecual formation underwent a drastic change. The oil was eventually trapped in the Oficina formation by the Guyana Shield and Carapita mudstones, but had to travel about 300 kilometers. Due to the long distance migration, the lighter fractions of the oil evaporated. Microbial activity further aided the transition to extra heavy oil.

== Reserves ==
90% of the world's proven extra heavy oil reserves are located in Venezuela, mainly in the Orinoco Oil Belt. Extending over 55,000 square kilometers in area, with profitable reservoirs at least 50 meters thick, the Orinoco Oil Belt is considered the largest single hydrocarbon accumulation in the world, holding an estimated 1.18 trillion barrels of oil in place along with 135 trillion cubic feet of gas.

== Production ==
The Carabobo-1 project commenced production in December 2012, with its first well CGO-0005 producing 30,000 barrels of oil per day by 2013. It is expected to reach a peak production of 400,000 barrels of oil per day by 2018. The Carabobo-2 project is still in its early stage of development, yet to produce. The Carabobo-3 project has begun engineering for development, and expected to start producing 50,000 barrels of oil per day, with a peak production of 400,000 barrels of oil per day by 2020. Upgraders capable of processing 200,000 barrels of oil per day into a lighter synthetic oil are expected to be built by 2017 to convert the tar-like crude into an usable and exportable commodity.

Many challenges are presented with the production of the extra heavy crude oil located in the Miocene tar sands. For starters, the extra heavy crudes have an average specific gravity of 4 to 16 °API, along with dynamic viscosities of 10,000 centipoise. These viscosities are equivalent to that of corn syrup, explaining the low recovery rates throughout the field.

Stratigraphy is also a challenge to production, as the pinch out of the Miocene Ofacina formation is characterized by shale barriers caused by the juxtaposition of different mudstone and sandstone facies. Thus, many reservoirs in the field are less than 50 meters thick, which is deemed unrecoverable.

Enhanced oil recovery methods have been implemented in the Carabobo oil field to improve the low recovery factors. Along with microbial enhanced oil recovery, which involves using microorganisms as biosurfactants to reduce the viscosities of the extra heavy crudes, immiscible gas injection, polymer flooding, and in situ combustion, better known as fireflooding, have all been used to improve the recovery of oil in the field. The advancements in horizontal drilling techniques have led to the use of steam assisted gravity drainage in extra heavy oil reservoirs. Steam assisted gravity drainage (SAGD) involves drilling two holes, one above the oil and the other below. Steam is then injected into the upper hole, causing the steam to condense and heat the oil. The oil becomes less viscous, and drains into the hole below due to gravity. Using this method, recovery could be as high as 87%, which is a vast improvement over other methods in use for extraction of extra heavy crude oils.
