= Oswaldo Arcia =

Venezuelan baseball player (born 1991)

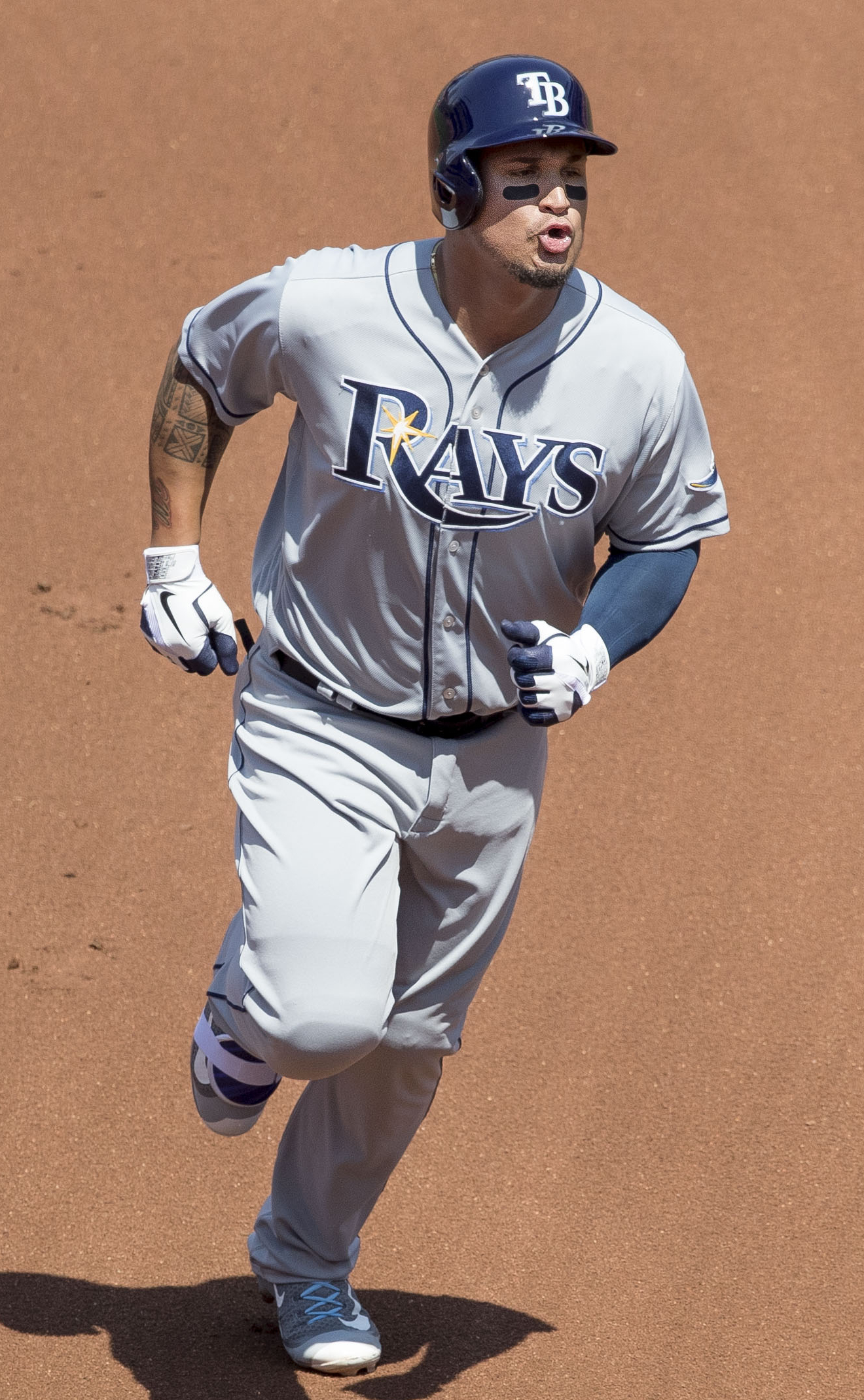
- Arcia with the Tampa Bay Rays

Free agent
- Outfielder
- Born: May 9, 1991 (age 35); Anaco, Venezuela
- Bats: Left Throws: Right

Professional debut
- MLB: April 15, 2013, for the Minnesota Twins
- NPB: March 30, 2018, for the Hokkaido Nippon-Ham Fighters

MLB statistics (through 2016 season)
- Batting average: .235
- Home runs: 44
- Runs batted in: 131

NPB statistics (through 2018 season)
- Batting average: .273
- Home runs: 9
- Runs batted in: 29
- Stats at Baseball Reference

Teams
- Minnesota Twins (2013–2016); Tampa Bay Rays (2016); Miami Marlins (2016); San Diego Padres (2016); Hokkaido Nippon-Ham Fighters (2018)

Oswaldo Celestino Arcia (born May 9, 1991) is a Venezuelan professional baseball outfielder who is a free agent. He has previously played in Major League Baseball (MLB) for the Minnesota Twins, Tampa Bay Rays, Miami Marlins, and San Diego Padres. He has also played in Nippon Professional Baseball (NPB) for the Hokkaido Nippon-Ham Fighters.

== Professional career ==
=== Minnesota Twins ===
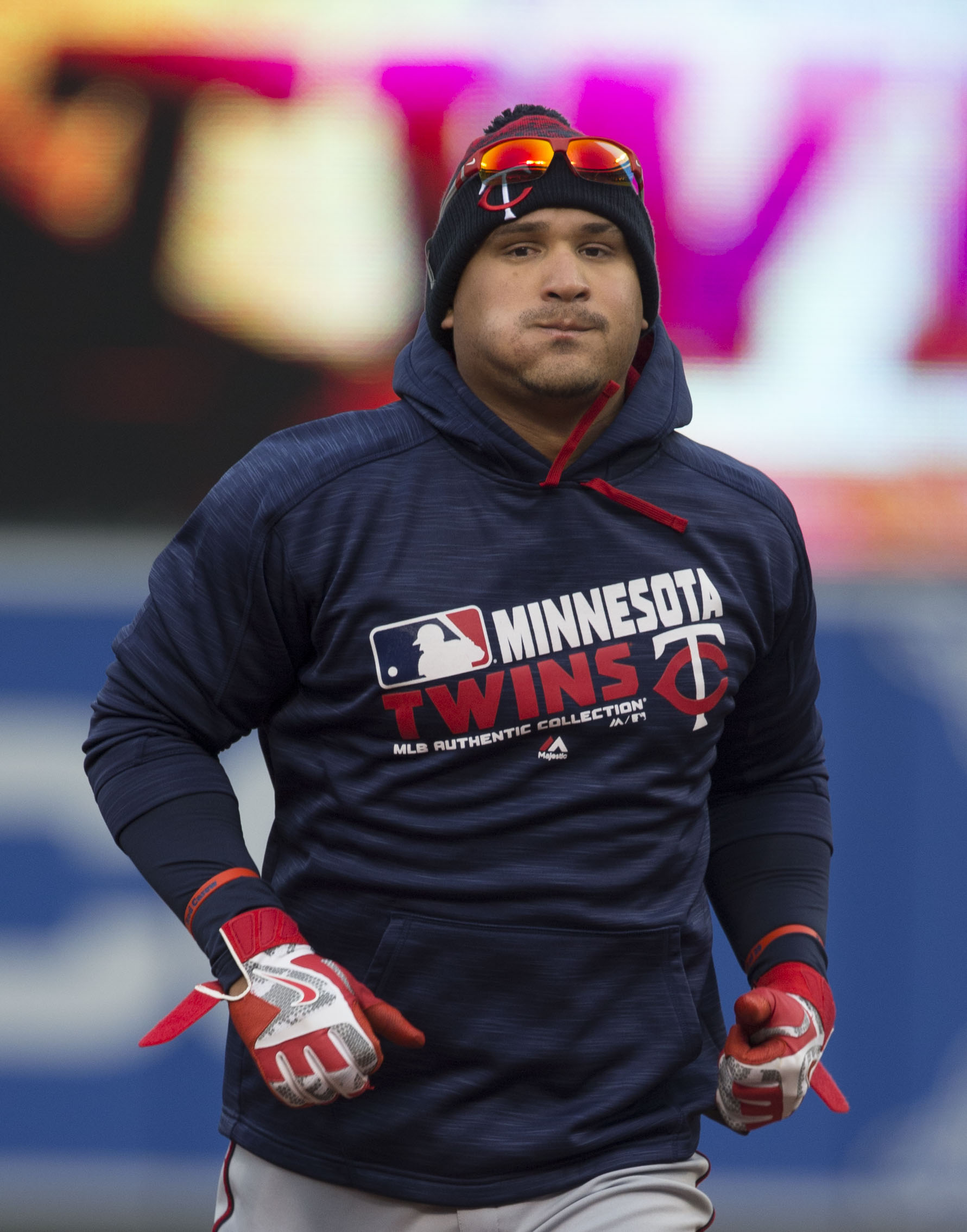
Arcia with the Minnesota Twins

Arcia signed with the Minnesota Twins as an amateur free agent in 2007. He was added to the team's 40-man roster on November 18, 2011, in order to remain protected from the Rule 5 draft.

Arcia was the Twins Minor League Hitter of the Year in 2012 after hitting .320/.388/.539 with 17 home runs and 98 runs batted in (RBI).

Arcia was called up to the major leagues for the first time on April 15, 2013. He went 1-for-3 in his major league debut. On April 23, Arcia hit his first career major league home run off José Fernández of the Miami Marlins. Arcia finished the season batting .251/.304/.430 with 14 home runs in 97 games. Arcia displayed poor plate discipline and showed a knack for swinging at the first pitch in an at bat. He struck out 117 times in 303 at bats and played left and right field for the Twins.

Arcia began the 2014 season as the starting right fielder for the Twins. He played in right before going on the DL with a wrist injury. He missed over a month due to the injury and was activated from the DL at the end of May. In 103 games, he slashed .231/.300/.452, slugging 20 home runs and amassing 57 RBIs. Arcia played in 19 games for the Twins in 2015. On June 3, he was demoted to Triple-A where he finished the year with the Rochester Red Wings. He batted .276/.338/.379 in 65 big league plate appearances, with two home runs and eight RBIs.

On June 16, 2016, Arcia was designated for assignment by the Twins to create room for Danny Santana, who was activated from the disabled list.

=== Tampa Bay Rays ===
On June 24, 2016, the Twins traded Arcia to the Tampa Bay Rays for a player to be named later. Arcia played 21 games for the Rays, before being designated for assignment on August 19.

=== Miami Marlins ===
On August 23, 2016, the Miami Marlins claimed Arcia off waivers and assigned him to their major league roster. After receiving two plate appearances with the Marlins across two games, they designated him for assignment on August 25, after acquiring Jeff Francoeur.

=== San Diego Padres ===
On August 27, 2016, Arcia was claimed off waivers by the San Diego Padres. In 14 games for San Diego, he hit .116/.156/.279 with two home runs and four RBI. On November 18, Arcia was designated for assignment after multiple prospects were added to the 40-man roster. He was released by the Padres organization on November 21.

=== Arizona Diamondbacks ===
On December 20, 2016, Arcia signed a minor league contract with the Arizona Diamondbacks. He spent the 2017 season with the Triple-A Reno Aces, playing in 93 games and hitting .326/.410/.639 with 24 home runs and 87 RBI. Arcia elected free agency following the season on November 6, 2017.

=== Hokkaido Nippon-Ham Fighters ===
Arcia signed a one-year, $1.16 million contract with the Hokkaido Nippon-Ham Fighters on December 15, 2017. He made 89 appearances for the Fighters in 2018, batting .222/.315/.405 with 14 home runs and 43 RBI.

=== Diablos Rojos del México ===
On February 15, 2019, Arcia signed with the Diablos Rojos del México of the Mexican League. In 14 appearances for México, Arcia slashed .265/.327/.592 with five home runs and 16 RBI.

=== Guerreros de Oaxaca ===
On May 3, 2019, Arcia was traded to the Guerreros de Oaxaca. In 45 appearances for the Guerreros, he batted .284/.437/.527 with eight home runs, 35 RBI, and three stolen bases. Arcia was released on July 24.

=== Olmecas de Tabasco ===
On July 27, 2019, Arcia signed with the Olmecas de Tabasco. In 14 games for Tabasco, he hit .170/.291/.234 with six RBI and two stolen bases. Arcia was released by the Olmecas on August 13.

On February 23, 2022, Arcia signed with the Cleburne Railroaders of the American Association. However, he did not appear in a game for the team in 2022.

=== Rieleros de Aguascalientes ===
On December 17, 2022, Arcia signed with the Toros de Tijuana of the Mexican League. However, prior to the start of the season on April 9, 2023, his rights were traded to the Rieleros de Aguascalientes. In 33 games, he batted .327/.511/.505 with 3 home runs and 12 RBIs. He was released on May 30

=== Mariachis de Guadalajara ===
On June 1, 2023, Arcia signed with the Mariachis de Guadalajara of the Mexican League. In 51 games for Guadalajara, he batted .337/.463/.622 with 11 home runs and 48 RBI.

=== Charros de Jalisco ===
On April 4, 2024, Arcia signed with the Charros de Jalisco of the Mexican League. In 81 games for Jalisco, Arcia batted .286/.414/.514 with 13 home runs, 48 RBI, and four stolen bases.

=== Saraperos de Saltillo ===
On July 22, 2024, Arcia was traded to the Saraperos de Saltillo of the Mexican League. In four games for Saltillo, he went 3-for-10 (.300) with one home run and two RBI.

Arcia made 11 appearances for Saltillo in 2025, hitting .180/.289/.256 with two RBI and one stolen base. He was released by the Saraperos on May 2, 2025.

=== Toros de Tijuana ===
On May 11, 2025, Arcia signed with the Toros de Tijuana of the Mexican League. In 42 appearances for Tijuana, he slashed .182/.353/.446 with nine home runs and 24 RBI. Arcia was released by the Toros on July 11.

=== Caliente de Durango ===
On July 11, 2025, Arcia signed with the Caliente de Durango of the Mexican League. In 19 games he hit .200/.360/.383 with 3 home runs and 13 RBIs. He became a free agent following the season.

== Personal life ==
His younger brother, Orlando Arcia, is a shortstop, who played most of his 2025 MLB games for the Colorado Rockies and most recently, on Jan. 3, 2026, signed a minor league contract with one of Oswaldo's former teams the Minnesota Twins, who he's been playing in Spring Training for.

== See also ==
- List of Major League Baseball players from Venezuela
