= Anaco Municipality =

Anaco Municipality Municipio Anaco
- Municipality
- Flag Coat of arms

- Location in Anzoátegui

- Location in Venezuela
- Coordinates: 9°21′13″N 64°29′33″W
- Country: Venezuela
- State: Anzoátegui
- Municipal seat: Anaco

Government
  - Mayor: Jesús Ríos Castellano (PSUV)

Area
  - Total: 812.8 km^{2} (313.8 sq mi)

Population (2011)
  - Total: 122,634
  - Density: 150.9/km^{2} (390.8/sq mi)
- Time zone: UTC−4 (VET)
- Area code(s): 0282

The Anaco Municipality is one of the 21 municipalities (municipios) that makes up the eastern Venezuelan state of Anzoátegui and, according to the 2011 census by the National Institute of Statistics of Venezuela, the municipality has a population of 122,634. The town of Anaco is the shire town of the Anaco Municipality.

== Economy ==
Anaco is an industrial town/municipality, connected to the natural gas and petroleum industries.

== Demographics ==
The Anaco Municipality, according to a 2007 population estimate by the National Institute of Statistics of Venezuela, has a population of 124,431 (up from 106,720 in 2000). This amounts to 8.4% of the state's population. The municipality's population density is 156.52 inhabitants per square kilometre (405.4/sq mi).

== Government ==
The mayor of the Anaco Municipality is Francisco Solorzano, elected on 23 November 2008 with 60% of the vote. He replaced Jacinto Romero Luna shortly after the elections. The municipality is divided into two parishes; Capital Anaco and San Joaquín.

== See also ==
- Anaco
- Anzoátegui
- Municipalities of Venezuela
