= El Tigre Airport =

- IATA: ELX; ICAO: none

Summary
- Airport type: Public
- Serves: El Tigre, Venezuela
- Elevation AMSL: 255 m / 837 ft
- Coordinates: 8°50′00″N 64°12′35″W

Map
- Location of airport in Venezuela

Runways
Direction	Length		Surface
Direction	m	ft	Surface
08/26	1,130	3,707	Asphalt
- Sources: GCM STV

El Tigre Airport (IATA: ELX) is an airport serving El Tigre, a town in the state of Anzoátegui in Venezuela. The airport is 6 kilometres (3.7 mi) south of the town.

Destinations

- Barcelona (Venezuela)
- Maiquetía

== See also ==
- Transport in Venezuela
- List of airports in Venezuela
- San Tomé Airport
