= Guanipa Municipality =

Guanipa Municipality Municipio Guanipa
- Municipality
- Flag Coat of arms

- Location in Anzoátegui

- Location in Venezuela
- Coordinates: 8°45′37″N 63°54′05″W
- Country: Venezuela
- State: Anzoátegui
- Municipal seat: San José de Guanipa

Government
  - Mayor: Pedro Martinez López (PSUV)

Area
  - Total: 1,118.8 km^{2} (432.0 sq mi)

Population (2018)
  - Total: 85.300
  - Density: 0.076242/km^{2} (0.19747/sq mi)
- Time zone: UTC−4 (VET)
- Area code(s): 0283

The Guanipa Municipality is one of the 21 municipalities (municipios) that makes up the eastern Venezuelan state of Anzoátegui. The town of San José de Guanipa (El Tigrito) is the shire town of the Guanipa Municipality.

== Demographics ==
The Guanipa Municipality, according to a 2007 population estimate by the National Institute of Statistics of Venezuela, has a population of 76,914 (up from 67,289 in 2000). This amounts to 5.2% of the state's population. The municipality's population density is 97.11 inhabitants per square kilometre (251.5/sq mi).

== Government ==
The mayor of the San José de Guanipa Municipality is Pedro Martínez, elected on November 23, 2008, with 62% of the vote. He replaced Freddy Tomás Arriojas Boada shortly after the elections. The municipality is divided into one parish; Capital San José de Guanipa.

== See also ==
- San José de Guanipa (El Tigrito)
- Anzoátegui
- Municipalities of Venezuela
