= Hollis Dow Hedberg =

American academic (1903–1988)

Hollis Dow Hedberg El Doctor Hedberg
- Born: Hollis Dow Hedberg; September 29, 1903; Falun, Kansas
- Died: August 14, 1988 (aged 84)
- Spouse: Frances Murray
- Children: Five, four sons and one daughter
- Awards: Wollaston Medal (1975); Penrose Medal (1980)

Hollis Dow Hedberg (May 29, 1903 – August 14, 1988; nickname: "El Doctor Hedberg") was an American geologist specializing in petroleum exploration. His contribution to stratigraphic classification of rocks and procedures is a monumental work which received universal acceptance. The firm he worked for, the Gulf Oil Corporation in Venezuela, trusted his findings and explored what had until then been uncharted territory. As a result, they reaped huge benefits from their petroleum findings. Hedberg taught at Princeton University from 1959 until his retirement in 1971. He was awarded the Mary Clark Thompson Medal by the National Academy of Sciences in 1973. In 1975 he was awarded the Wollaston Medal by the Geological Society of London. Hedberg won the Sidney Powers Memorial Award in 1963.

== Early life ==
Hollis Dow Hedberg was born on 29 May 1903 in Falun, Kansas. He belonged to a small Swedish community and his parents lived on the second floor of the house. At that time Kansas experienced the worst flood in its history. His father, Carl August Hedberg, born in Sweden came to the US as one of four children. His mother, Zada Mary Dow, was of Scottish-English descent. He had an older brother, James, and a younger sister, Carol.

His initial years were difficult; he worked in the fields. He learned how to whistle as a boy at age 8. Overtime, he developed a skill for whistling, which became one of his hobbies and traits later on in life, while ploughing fields with horses. He came from a musical family: his father played violin, his mother the piano, his brother James the viola, and he played cello. They were fond of reading books to one another.

== Education ==
Hedberg joined the Falun elementary school in 1909 and attended Falun Rural High School from 1916 to 1920. After graduating from high school, in 1920 he was admitted to the University of Kansas in Lawrence. Initially he was interested in journalism but later decided to study geology. His college study was interrupted when his father died in 1921 forcing him to return home to run the farm. He resumed his studies in 1922 and in 1925 completed his BA degree in geology with a distinction as a Phi Beta Kappa key. He joined Cornell University in Ithaca, New York in 1925 and in 1926 was awarded an MS in geology. In 1924 and 1925, he enjoyed a summer internship as a field assistant for the Kansas State Geological Survey. In 1926, he contributed a technical paper on "The Effect of Gravitational Compaction on the Structure of Sedimentary Rocks" based on his investigations at the University of Kansas. He put forward a theory that porosity in shales was an index of pressure metamorphism liable to indicate the presence of oil, years before the approach was documented in the literature. He was awarded a Ph.D. from Stanford University in 1937.

== Career ==
His first employment in 1926 was as a petrographer with the Maracaibo laboratory. He worked in this capacity for Lago Petroleum Corporation, a Venezuelan subsidiary of Standard Oil. In June 1926, he travelled to Maracaibo, his first business trip outside the United States. He wrote letters to his mother every other day as he was very close to his family. Fond of travel, he went on tours almost every week. When in the Misoa River area, on the eastern part of Lake Maracaibo, he almost lost his life in a flash flood in the Ryan River during an intense rainstorm. Based on his field investigations during this period he propounded the theory that correlation and dating of rocks could be undertaken without the help of fossils which he documented in a paper titled "Some Aspects of Sedimentary Petrography in Relation to Stratigraphy in the Bolivar Coast Fields of the Maracaibo Basin, Venezuela" (1928)".

The end result of Dr. Hedberg's work was the most comprehensive regional interpretation of the eastern Venezuela basin ever done: a masterpiece which still serves as the standard reference for eastern Venezuela.

— (Juan Chacin, President and CEO (retired) of PDVSA

As he was not enthused by the work he was doing, he terminated his contract with Lago Petroleum and returned to New York in March 1928. He then decided to join the geological laboratory of the Venezuelan Gulf Oil Company in Maracaibo as a stratigrapher. But his ship was diverted to Port Arthur and in the confusion he returned to New York on a train and took another ship. On board he met Frances Murray, whom he later married. In 1928, he became head of the geological laboratory.

In spite of frequent health problems, he undertook extensive field trips and published papers propounding many new theories on the stratigraphy of geological sections in different regions of Venezuela. A particular find described in a paper titled "Cretaceous Limestones as Petroleum Source Rock in Northwestern Venezuela" (1931) was of the La Luna Formation of Cenomanian/Turonian Age, concluding that Luna Formation was a major source of the petroleum embedded in tertiary sediments in the Lake Maracaibo area. He also established a network of measured stratigraphic sections of the Rio Querecual in eastern Venezuela.

One of Hedberg's endearing qualities in Venezuela was helping local Indians. One of them, Innocensio, a worker who was helping him in his field work in Perija Mountains was eager to learn to read and write, practicing under a tree at night. He appointed him as assistant in the laboratory at Maracaibo where Innocensio eventually turned out to be one of Gulf Oil's best technicians.

There was a brief interlude when Frances Murray visited Venezuela. Hedberg dated her, took a holiday in New York and after a brief engagement in September 1932, married her that November. She joined him later in Venezuela in 1933.

In 1934, he took a brief break from his work to complete his doctorate from Stanford University, Palo Alto after undertaking geological research in 1934-35 and publishing his first paper on stratigraphic nomenclature, a forerunner of his monumental work in the field. He was awarded his doctorate in June 1937, in absentia. In his professional career, he was promoted in December 1939 as Assistant Chief Geologist and posted to Gulf's San Tomé camp in eastern Venezuela. In August 1946, he became Chief Geologist of the Gulf Oil's foreign exploration unit for foreign projects (excluding Venezuela), working from New York. He became Chief Geologist for worldwide operations in September 1952 and moved to Oakmont in Pittsburg. In 1957 he was appointed the Vice President of all Gulf Oil explorations, a position he retained until 1964. He then became exploration advisor to the executive until 1968. He retired from Gulf Oil Corporation in 1968.

Hedberg made significant contributions in the field of geology of the oceans. Hedberg chaired the Project Mohole committee from 1962-1963. Project Mohole was an ambitious attempt to drill through the Earth's crust into the Mohorovičić discontinuity, and it was one of the first attempts at deep ocean drilling. In 1967, on his suggestion, Gulf Oil Exploration launched "R/V Gulfrex", an exploration ship which operated across the globe until 1975 covering some 160,000 miles. The R/V Gulfrex was replaced in 1974 by the "R/V Hollis Hedberg", named after Hedberg. The R/V Hedberg covered 200,000 miles before being decommissioned in 1985.

His approach was that the "other side of the basin", the Deep Shore should be explored for petroleum. This led to his commitment to defend the offshore limits and urged the United States to protect its offshore petroleum resources. He proposed a "multi-company/government academic institutions consortium to evaluate the offshore potential". During the Reagan administration, he prepared a well-researched paper "National-International Jurisdictional Boundary on the Ocean Floor". In the third United Nations Law of the Sea Conference, he opposed the move to limit the jurisdiction of a country to an arbitrary 200 nautical miles limit as it would cause 250,000 square mile jurisdictional loss of territory to the US for deep water exploration. Though the UN Law of the Sea Convention was adopted, President Ronald Reagan refused to sign it and he walked out of the Third Convention. Credit for this is attributed to Hedberg.

Between 1959 and 1972, Hedberg worked as a professor in the Princeton University and lectured graduate students on "Stratigraphic Systems".

== Honors ==
Hedberg received many honors and awards, becoming the first foreign recipient of the Medalla de Honor de la Instruccion Publica, which was awarded by the Venezuelan Government in 1941. Upon his retirement from Princeton, he was honored in 1972 by a conference on petroleum and global tectonics. His awards list is long and impressive and includes Sidney Powers Medal and the University of Kansas Distinguished Service Award in 1963 and the Geological Society of America's Penrose Medal in 1980. The Penrose Medal is the most prestigious award for a geologist in the United States.

== Personal life ==
Hedberg married Frances Murray and they had five children: they had four sons: Ronald, James, William, and Franklin Augustin, and one daughter: Mary. He and Frances Murray had a happy married life of 56 years. His wife who helped him in his work contributed to a well knit family. Three of his children also hold Phd degrees.

Hedberg was a keen athlete and continued his interest of gardening in his vegetable garden in his holiday home in Cape Cod. Occasionally he played the accordion and also took part in square dancing with his wife. He died on 14 August 1988. ISEM had proudly housed the Hollis D. Hedberg Library. The Institute for the Study of Earth and Man at Southern Methodist University maintains the Hollis D. Hedberg Library, a collection of Hedberg's 18th to 20th century travel and geology books on Venezuela and Latin America.
