= Orinoco Belt =

Territory and oilfield in Venezuela

Orinoco Petroleum Belt
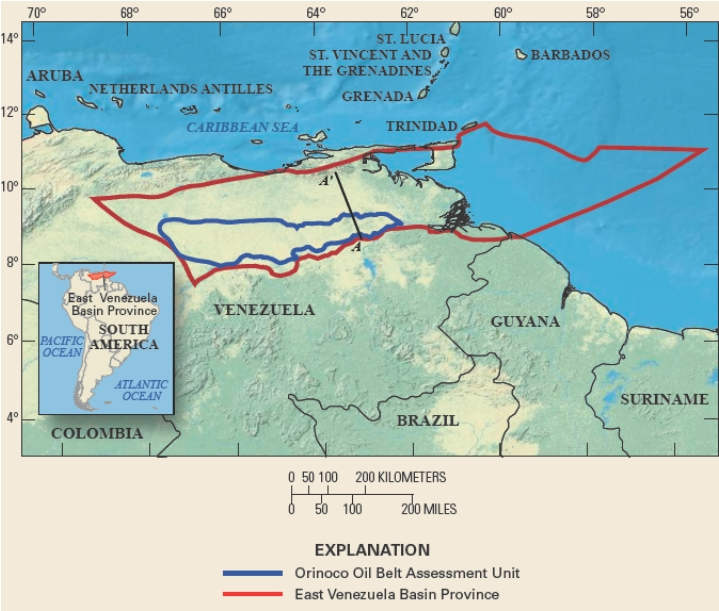
- Orinoco oil belt assessment unit, USGS
- Country: Venezuela
- Location: Guárico, Anzoátegui, Monagas, Delta Amacuro
- Offshore/onshore: Onshore
- Operator: Petróleos de Venezuela S.A.
- Partners: Petróleos de Venezuela S.A., Chevron Corporation, Repsol YPF, Mitsubishi Corporation, Inpex, Suelopetrol CA, Eni, PetroVietnam, Petronas, Petropar, ONGC, Indian Oil Corporation, Oil India, CNPC, Rosneft, Gazprom Neft, Lukoil, TNK-BP, Surgutneftegaz

Field history
- Start of production: 2013 (expected)

Production
- Estimated oil in place: 1,300,000 million barrels (~1.8×10^{11} t)

The Orinoco Belt is a territory in the southern strip of the eastern Orinoco River basin in Venezuela which overlies the world's largest deposits of petroleum. Its local Spanish name is Faja Petrolífera del Orinoco (Orinoco Petroleum Belt). The Orinoco Belt is located in Guárico and south of the Anzoátegui, Monagas, and Delta Amacuro states, and it follows the line of the river. It is approximately 600 kilometres (370 mi) from east to west, and 70 kilometres (43 mi) from north to south, with an area about 55,314 square kilometres (21,357 sq mi).

== Oil reserves ==
The Orinoco Belt consists of large deposits of extra heavy crude oil. Venezuela's heavy oil deposits of about 1,200 billion barrels (1.9×10^{11} m^{3}), found primarily in the Orinoco Petroleum Belt, are estimated to approximately equal the world's reserves of lighter oil. Petróleos de Venezuela S.A. has estimated that the producible reserves of the Orinoco Belt are up to 235 billion barrels (3.74×10^{10} m^{3}) which would make it the largest petroleum reserve in the world, slightly ahead of the similar unconventional oil source in the Canadian Athabasca oil sands, as well as above Saudi Arabia. In 2009, the US Geological Survey increased the estimated reserves to 513 billion barrels (8.16×10^{10} m^{3}) of oil which is "technically recoverable (producible using currently available technology and industry practices)." No estimate of how much of the oil is economically recoverable was made.

The Orinoco Belt is currently divided into four exploration and production areas. These are: Boyacá (formerly Machete), Junín (formerly Zuata), Ayacucho (formerly Hamaca), and Carabobo (formerly Cerro Negro). The current exploration area is about 11,593 square kilometres (4,476 sq mi).

== Development ==
On January 7, 1936, Standard Oil of New Jersey, with the drilling of the well "La Canoa-1" located near the community of La Canoa, Anzoategui state, began the exploitation of the Orinoco Oil Belt. That well was active for 44 days, producing approximately 1,000 net barrels of crude oil per day. The exploitation activities were then abandoned due to the difficulty in extracting the extra-heavy hydrocarbons. In 1938, the first well discovering hydrocarbons was drilled with the name "Zuata 1".

=== Oil Sowing Plan 2005–2030 ===
Source:The data in this section are taken directly from the official PDVSA web page.

Venezuela power policy guidelines until 2030 are drawn up in the "Oil Sowing Plan" ("Plan Siembra Petrolera"), which includes six development projects and consists of two stages: one executed from 2005 to 2012, and another developed from 2012 to 2030. For the first period of plan, an overall investment of around US$56 billion was estimated between 2005 and 2012. 70% of that amount was to be financed by Venezuela — state operator — and the rest by the private sector.

Oil Sowing Plan 2005–2012 included six fundamental axes:

1. Magna Reserve Project: Destined toward the quantifying and certifying of oil reserves in the Orinoco Oil Belt. In a presentation given by PDVSA (held by Director Ignacio Layrisse) at the VII LAPEC conference in Buenos Aires, March 2001, the proven Venezuelan reserves were given as 76 billion barrels (1.21×10^{10} m^{3}). Of this amount 52 billion barrels (8.3×10^{9} m^{3}) were heavy or extra heavy oil, including 37 billion reserves of extra heavy in the Orinoco Belt (1 in Machete, 15 in Zuata, 6 in Hamaca and 15 in Cerro Negro). This indicates that Venezuela's reserves, according to PDVSA, in 2001 were 39 billion barrels (6.2×10^{9} m^{3}) excluding the Orinoco Belt.
2. Orinoco Project: In charge of developing the Orinoco Belt. Twenty-seven blocks have been selected for development under this project with the cooperation of selected companies. Because of the strategic location of this hydrocarbon reservoir, it is considered of vital importance in reducing levels of overcrowding in some parts of the country and providing local employment. Services and housing will be developed to guarantee adequate oil exploitation.
3. Delta-Caribbean Project: Gas will be incorporated to the country energy supply. This project pursues offshore gas development in the Deltana Platform off the coast of eastern Venezuela. Further developments are located in the Paraguaná Peninsula, to the north-west of the country.
4. Refinement: To increase refinement capacity in Venezuela is one of PDVSA's strategic goals. Oil Sowing Plan undertakes the creation of new refineries: Cabruta (with capacity for 400,000 extra-heavy crude barrels per day), Batalla de Santa Ines (50,000 barrels (7,900 m^{3})) and Caripito (50,000 barrels per day (7,900 m^{3}/d) destined to asphalt production). With these three new refineries and the improvement of the existing ones, PDVSA's processing capacity on Venezuelan soil will be increased to 700,000 barrels per day (110,000 m^{3}/d).
5. Infrastructure: More filling centers and pipelines will be set up to guarantee fuel supplies to the whole nation. The agreement for the construction of the Transguajiro gas pipeline between Venezuela and Colombia has been signed in 2005.
6. Integration: According to Hugo Chávez's aims, oil is to be used as a geopolitical resource helping the integration of the peoples of Latin America and the Caribbean. Venezuela thus created Petrocaribe and signed the Petrosur agreement. A refinery was also to be built close to Petrobras in Brazil.

=== Production blocks ===
Production blocks will be developed by PDVSA in cooperation with foreign partners. In all partnership PDVSA owns 60%.

==== Junin ====
Junín block 1 was discovered in 2009 and developed by PDVSA. The oil field is operated and owned by PDVSA. The total proven reserves of the Junín-1 oil field are around 2 billion barrels (320,000,000 m^{3}), and production is centered on 200,000 barrels per day (32,000 m^{3}/d).

Junin block 2 is under development in cooperation with Petrovietnam. SNC-Lavalin was awarded the engineering contract on March 10, 2010. It is expected to produce 200 thousand barrels per day (32×10^{3} m^{3}/d) by 2011. The development will include also a heavy crude upgrader; however, its commissioning date is not specified.

Junín Block 3 was discovered in 2009 and developed by PDVSA. The oil field is operated and owned by PDVSA. The total proven reserves of the Junín-3 oil field are around 4.26 billion barrels (677,000,000 m^{3}), and production is centered on 200,000 barrels per day (32,000 m^{3}/d).

Junin block 4 is developed in cooperation with CNPC (40%). It is expected to produce 400 thousand barrels per day (64×10^{3} m^{3}/d); however, the commissioning date is not announced.

Junin block 5 is developed in cooperation with Eni (40%). It is expected to produce 75 thousand barrels per day (11.9×10^{3} m^{3}/d) by 2013 with late production of 240 thousand barrels per day (38×10^{3} m^{3}/d). The development will include an oil refinery for production of motor fuels. Junin block 6 is developed in cooperation with a consortium of Russian oil companies, including Rosneft, Gazprom Neft, Lukoil, TNK-BP and Surgutneftegaz. It is expected to produce 450 thousand barrels per day (72×10^{3} m^{3}/d); however, the commissioning date is not announced.

Junín block 7 was discovered in 2009 and developed by PDVSA. The oil field is operated and owned by PDVSA. The total proven reserves of the Junín-7 oil field are around 31 billion barrels (4.9×10^{9} m^{3}), and production is centered on 200,000 barrels per day (32,000 m^{3}/d).

Junín block 8 was discovered in 2009 and developed by PDVSA. The oil field is operated and owned by PDVSA. The total proven reserves of the Junín-8 oil field are around 40 billion barrels (6.4×10^{9} m^{3}). The same year, PDVSA and Sinopec signed an agreement to collaborate on the development of the block, whose future production was estimated to be 200,000 barrels per day (32,000 m^{3}/d).

The Junín block 10 was discovered in 2009 and developed by PDVSA. The oil field is operated and owned by PDVSA. The total proven reserves of the Junín-10 oil field are around 10.5 billion barrels (1.67×10^{9} m^{3}), and production is centered on 220,000 barrels per day (35,000 m^{3}/d).

==== Carabobo ====
Carabobo 1 is developed in cooperation with Repsol YPF (11%), Petronas (11%), ONGC (11%), Indian Oil Corporation (3.5%), and Oil India (3.5%). It consists of Carabobo block 1 North and block 1 Central. The expected production output will be 400 thousand barrels per day (64×10^{3} m^{3}/d) by 2013. The upgrader is expected to be ready by 2017.

Carabobo 3 is developed in cooperation with Chevron Corporation (34%), Suelopetrol (1%) pct, and Mitsubishi Corporation and Inpex (5%). It consists of Carabobo block 2 South, block 3, and block 5. The expected production output will be 400 thousand barrels per day (64×10^{3} m^{3}/d) by 2013. The upgrader is expected to be ready by 2017.

Carabobo 2 will be developed in cooperation with Rosneft and Corporation Venezolana del Petroleo (CVP) – a subsidiary of Venezuela's state oil and gas company PDVSA. The agreement, signed by Rosneft CEO Igor Sechin and Venezuelan Oil Minister, PDVSA chief Rafael Ramirez in the presence of President Hugo Chávez, establishes a joint venture to develop the Carabobo 2 bloc in the southern Orinoco extra-heavy crude belt in Venezuela.

The signed memorandum established Rosneft's share will be 40 percent. Rosneft will pay CVP a bonus of $1.1 billion, paid out in two installments: $440 million within ten days after the establishment of the joint venture, and the rest after Rosneft makes the final decision on the project. In addition, Rosneft will issue a $1.5 billion loan to CVP for five years. The loan will be provided in tranches of not more than $300 million annually at the annual interest rate of LIBOR+5.5 percent. To develop the Carabobo 2 bloc Rosneft will invest a total of $16 billion, according to CEO Igor Sechin. The Carabobo 2 bloc's reserves total 6.5 billion metric tons of crude. Commercial oil production at the bloc is expected to hit 400,000 barrels per day. Rosneft, along with several Russian oil companies (Gazprom Neft, Lukoil, TNK-BP and Surgutneftegaz), have formed a consortium to develop the Junin bloc 6 of the Orinoco belt in Venezuela.

The formation waters from the boreholes show a main Na-Cl level (TDS up to 30g/L) with a dilution trend toward Na-HCO_{3} composition (down to 1g/L). The stable isotope ratio of oxygen and hydrogen of water molecule reveal that the seawater mother water was modified during a high-temperature thrusting event (120–125 °C), forming ^{18}O-enriched diagenetic water (up to +4‰), which was diluted in recent times by glacial meltwater and presentday meteoric water. The hypothetical presence of flood by a meteoric paleo-water also offers new hints to explain the low API gravity (<10°API biodegraded, extra heavy oil) and composition of the local crude.

== See also ==
- Orinoco Mining Arc
- List of oil fields
- San Tomé, Venezuela
- Hollis Dow Hedberg
