= Anaco =

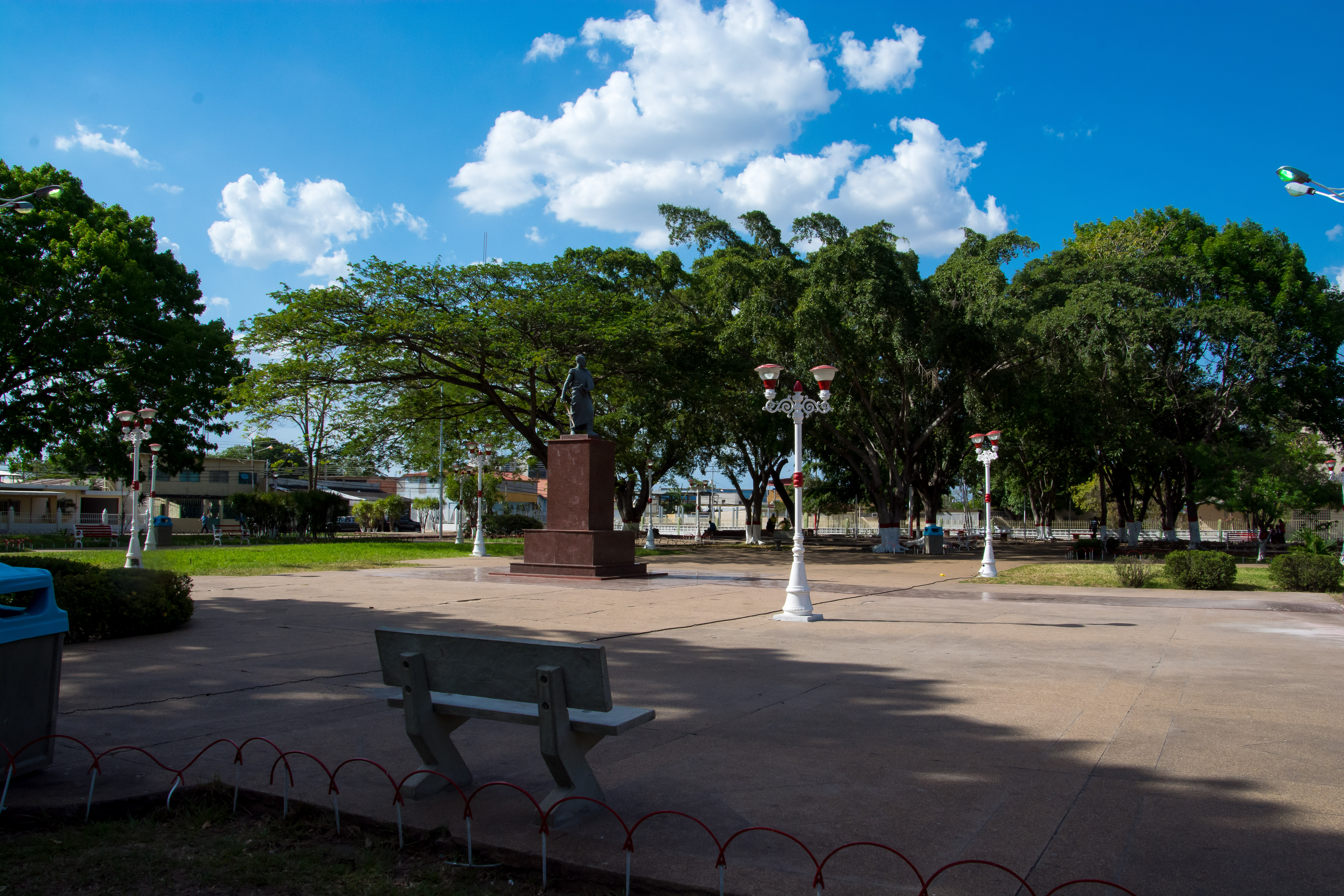
- Bolivar Square in Anaco.

- Flag Coat of arms

- Location within Venezuela Location within South America
- Coordinates: 9°28′55″N 64°29′30″W
- Country: Venezuela
- State: Anzoátegui
- Municipality: Anaco Municipality
- Founded: 1944
- Elevation: 215 m (705 ft)

Population (2005)
  - Total: 106,000
  - Demonym: Anaquense
- Time zone: UTC−4 (VET)
- Postal code: 6003
- Area code: 0282
- Climate: Aw

Anaco is a city in Anzoátegui State, Venezuela, the shire town of Anaco Municipality. It is an industrial town, connected to the natural gas and petroleum industries. Estimated population (as of 2005): 106,275 inhabitants.

== Transport ==
The city is served by Anaco Airport. No longer in service for commercial flights. Anaco is on the San Tomé-Puerto la Cruz highway that connects the town with San Tomé and El Tigre to the south and Puerto la Cruz on the coast.

== Notable people ==
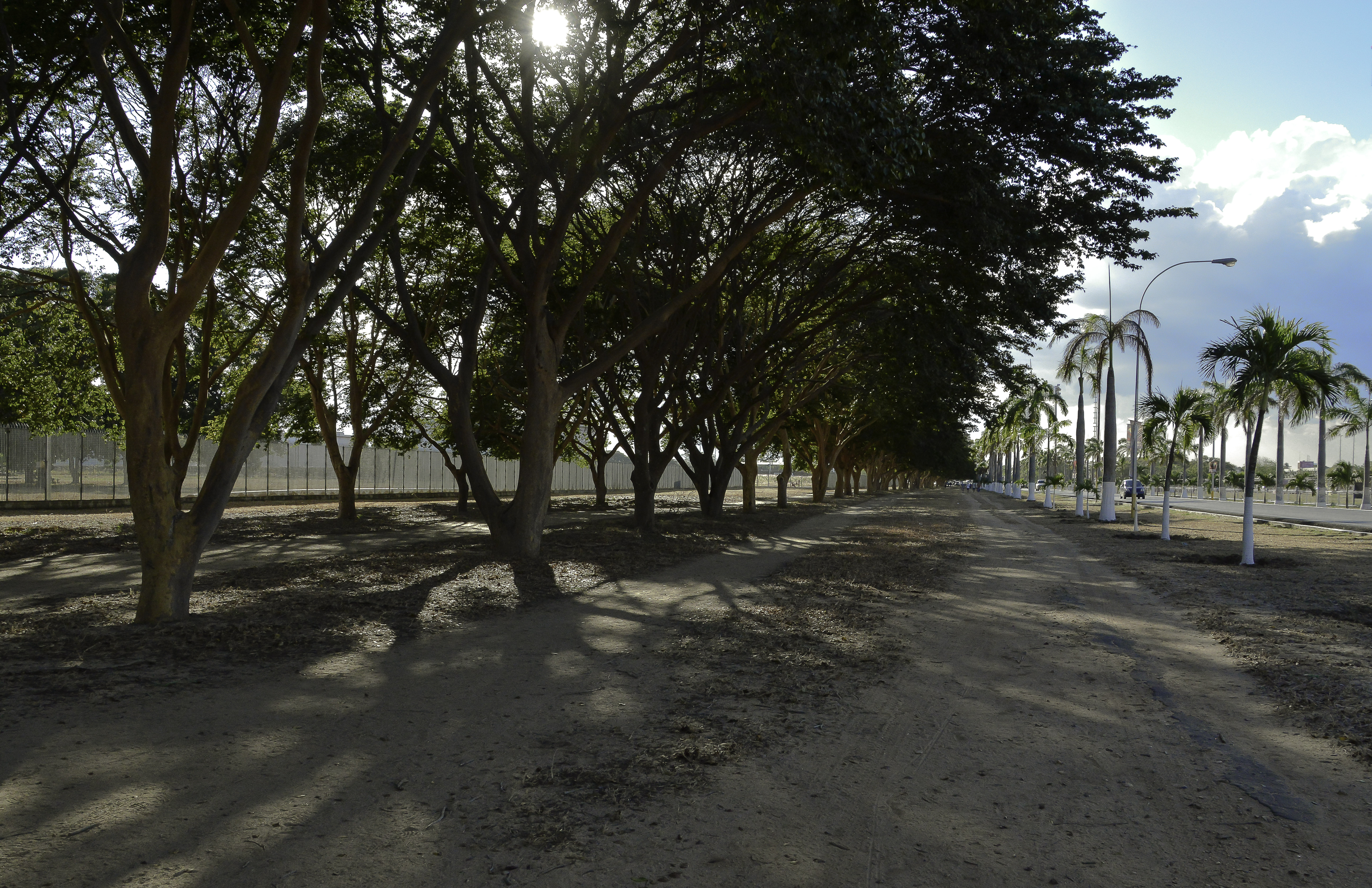
Street in Anaco.

- Omar Rudberg, singer and actor.
- Nathalie Rayes, activist and sociologist.
- Orlando Arcia, Atlanta Braves shortstop, younger brother of Oswaldo Arcia
- Oswaldo Arcia, Minnesota Twins outfielder, older brother of Orlando Arcia
- Ruddy Rodríguez – former Miss Venezuela
- Miguel Cairo – Professional baseball player

== See also ==
- List of cities and towns in Venezuela
