= Mene Grande Oil Company =

Subsidiary of Gulf Oil in Venezuela

The Mene Grande Oil Company (Meneg) was the subsidiary of Gulf Oil in Venezuela. While the company was organized in 1925, Gulf Oil acquired it only in 1936 and effective December 12, 1936 transferred all assets of the Venezuela Gulf Oil Co. to Mene Grande, under which name all business was henceforth conducted.

== Assets ==
The 100 mile (115,000bpd) 16-inch pipeline to Oficina was the first 16-inch pipe line ever laid for the transport of oil. The contracts to Williams Brothers (Tulsa) and Bechtel (Los Angeles) were let on March 1, 1939. The construction equipment (including 35 heavy duty and 10 pickup trucks, 2 months worth of food and the first 25 carloads of pipe) was loaded at Baltimore onto the Norwegian 1,100 ton freighter Herma on March 25, 1939. Some of the 16-inch outer diameter 40 ft seamless pipe joints in 62.579 and 67.658 pounds per foot variants were produced in (Nazi) Germany. Stringing of pipe began on April 3 by a single crew moving southwards from the Guanta terminal near Puerto la Cruz, along a preexisting highway built by Mene Grande, followed a few miles behind by the jointing crew which welded together 7 joints on a dolly, followed by the ditching crew and the main welding crew (began work on April 8). All welding was electric by subcontractor H.C. Price (Bartlesville). The pipe was coated with enamel and wrapped in asbestos felt by a wrapping machine. Total employment was 100 Americans brought in from overseas and 200 Venezuelan laborers. The last weld was made on July 10, 1939. 100 miles in 98 days. A 16-inch loop from the Anaco pumping station to P. la Cruz was laid before 1947. Socony-Vacuum also laid a 12-inch loop line over essentially the entire length in 1947, but for their own needs.

A 30,000bpd refinery was placed on stream at Puerto La Cruz on April 25, 1950. Texaco through its Venezuelan subsidiary had a 1/3 interest. The 1943 oil law required 10 percent of production to be refined within the country. Sinclair finished its $20 million 35,000bpd refinery at Puerto La Cruz later in 1950.
