= San José de Guanipa =

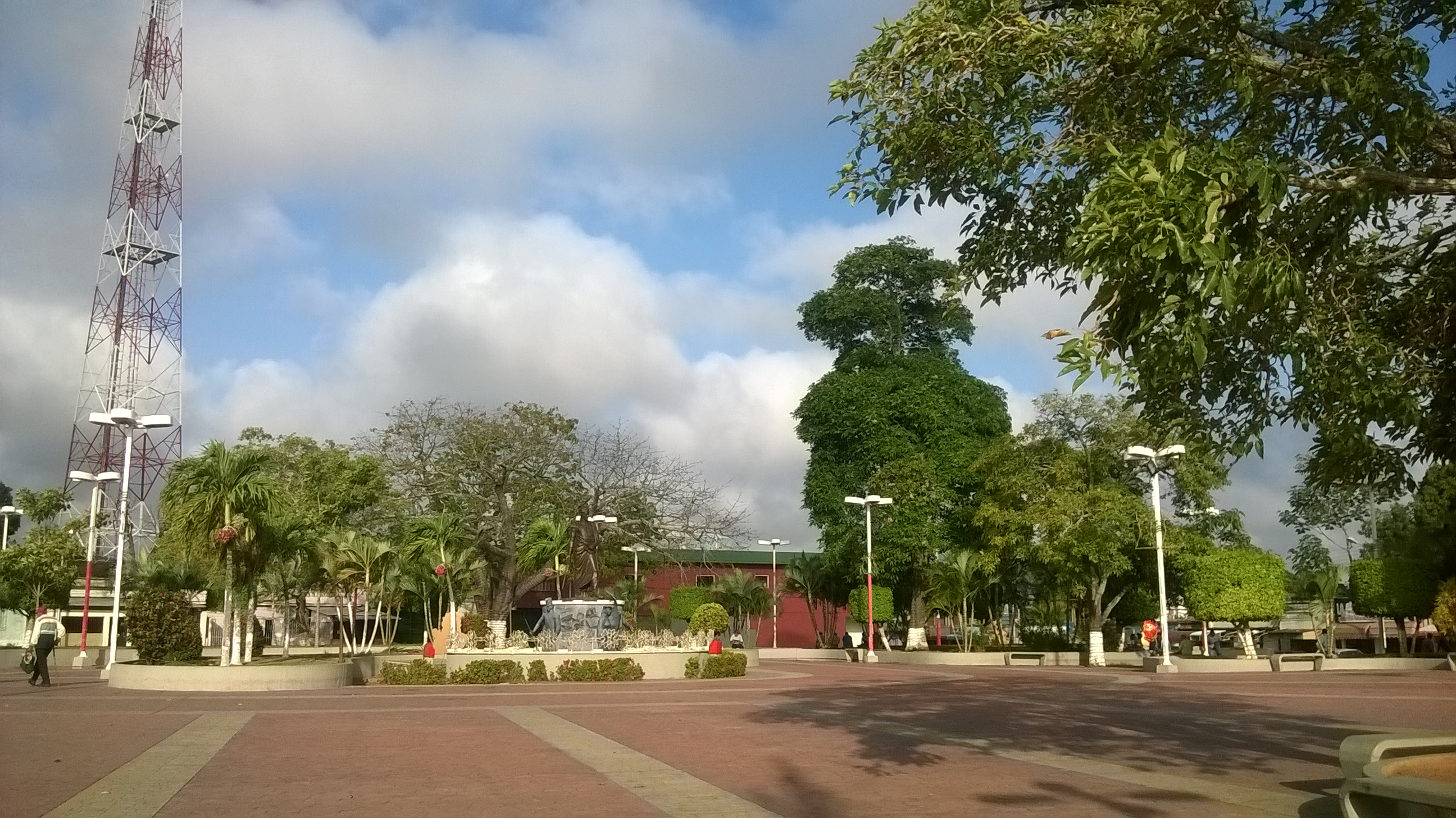

- Flag Coat of arms

- Location within Venezuela
- Coordinates: 8°53′N 64°09′W
- Country: Venezuela
- State: Anzoátegui
- Municipality: Guanipa Municipality
- Founded: 14 November 1910

Population (2018)
  - Total: 85.300
- Time zone: UTC−4 (VET)
- Postal code: 6054
- Area code: 0283
- Climate: Aw

San José de Guanipa (Spanish pronunciation: [saŋ xoˈse ðe ɣwaˈnipa]), also known as El Tigrito, is a city in the state of Anzoátegui, Venezuela. It is the capital of Guanipa Municipality. Officially founded in 1910, it was previously a settlement of the Kali'na people. El Tigrito lies between the larger town El Tigre and the oil camp of San Tomé.

Like the Guanipa River, the city is named for the Kali'na cacique Guanipa.

== See also ==
- List of cities and towns in Venezuela
