= Flight 111 =

Flight 111 may refer to:

Listed chronologically

- Aviaco Flight 111, crashed on 9 May 1957
- Aeronaves de México Flight 111, crashed on 2 June 1958
- Swissair Flight 111, crashed on 2 September 1998
- Allied Air Flight 111, crashed on 2 June 2012
- Școala Superioară de Aviație Civilă Flight 111, crashed on 20 January 2014

== See also ==
- Northwest Orient Airlines Flight 1-11, ditched on 14 July 1960
- STS-111, a successful Space Shuttle mission in June 2002
