= Aviaco =

Spanish airline

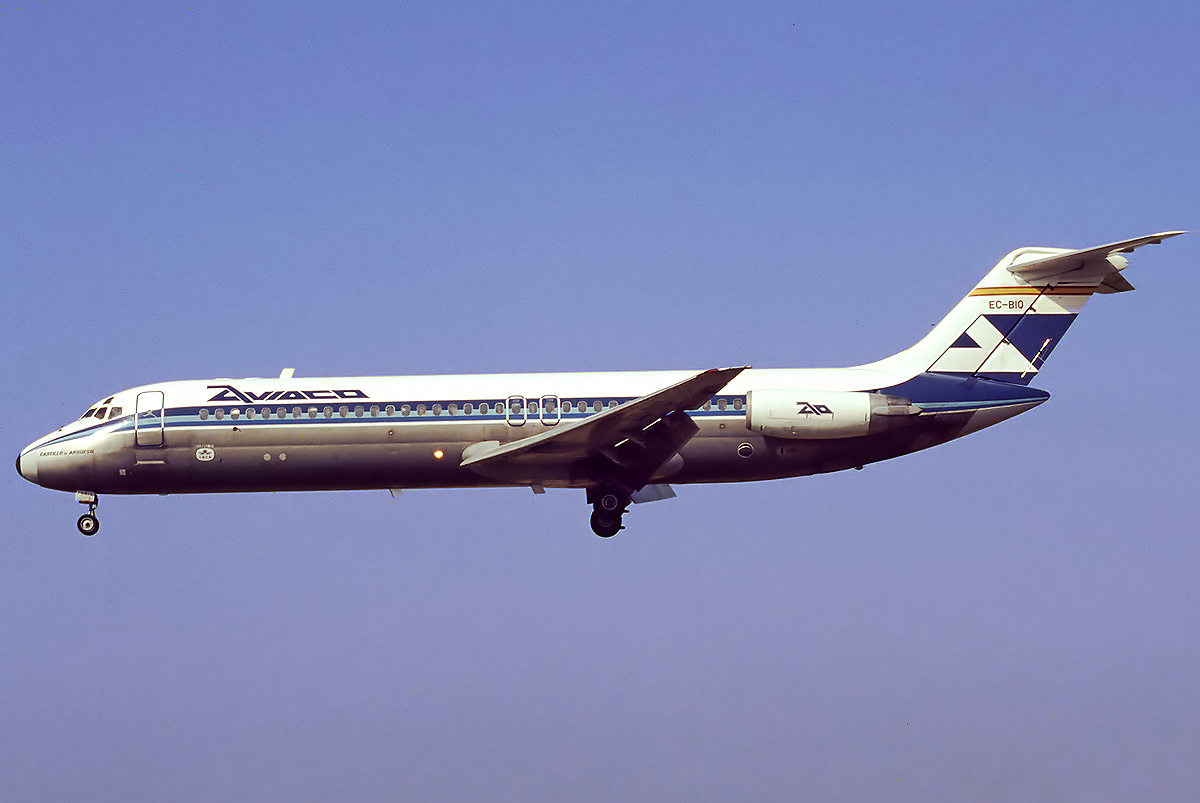
IATA	ICAO	Call sign
AO	AYC	AVIACO
- Founded: 18 February 1948
- Ceased operations: 1 September 1999
- Operating bases: Madrid-Barajas Airport
- Parent company: Iberia
- Headquarters: Madrid, Spain
- Key people: Elías Ugartechea Isusi

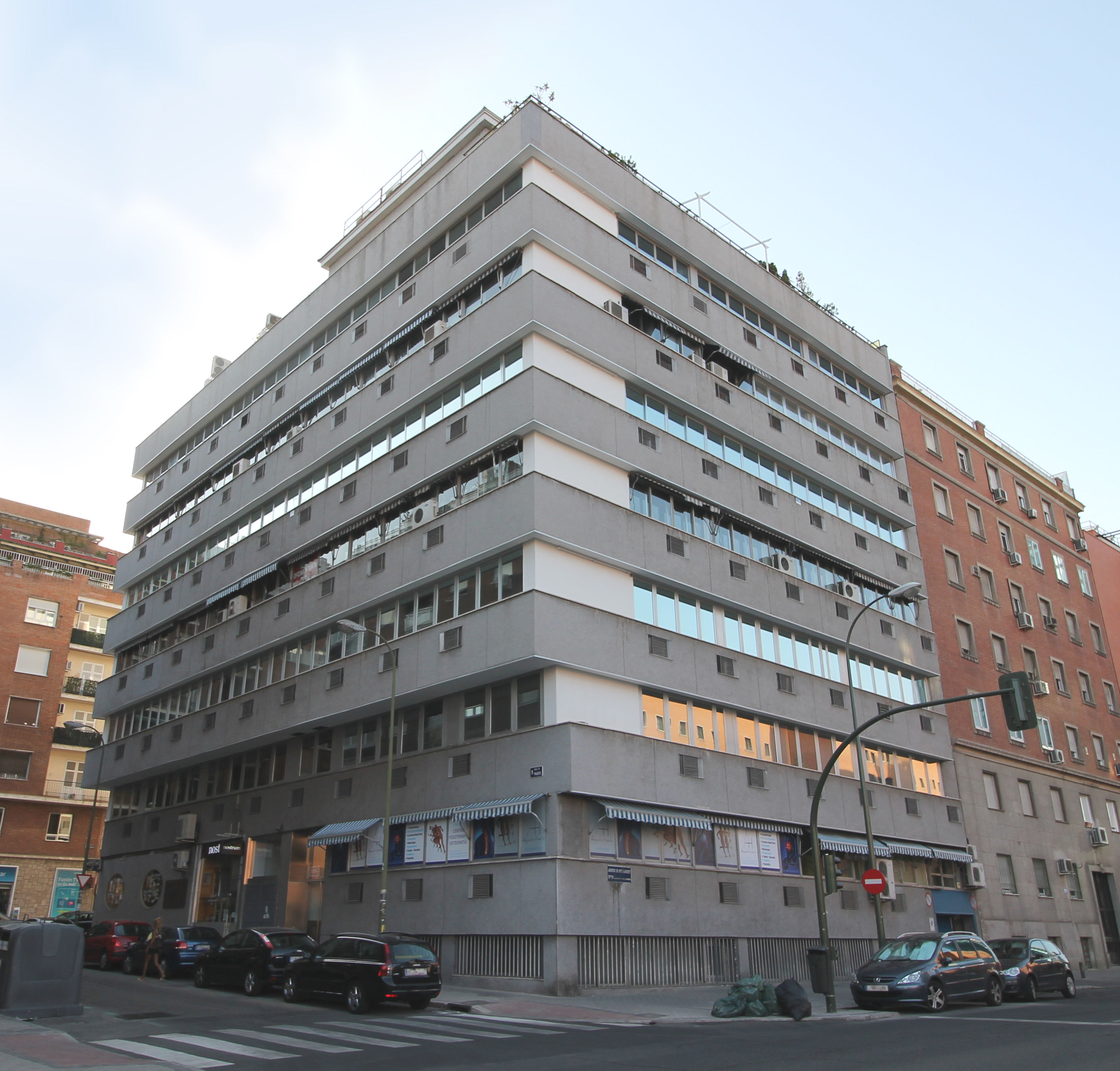
Former head office of Aviaco

Aviación y Comercio, S.A., doing business as Aviaco, was a Spanish airline headquartered in the Edificio Minister in Madrid.

== History ==
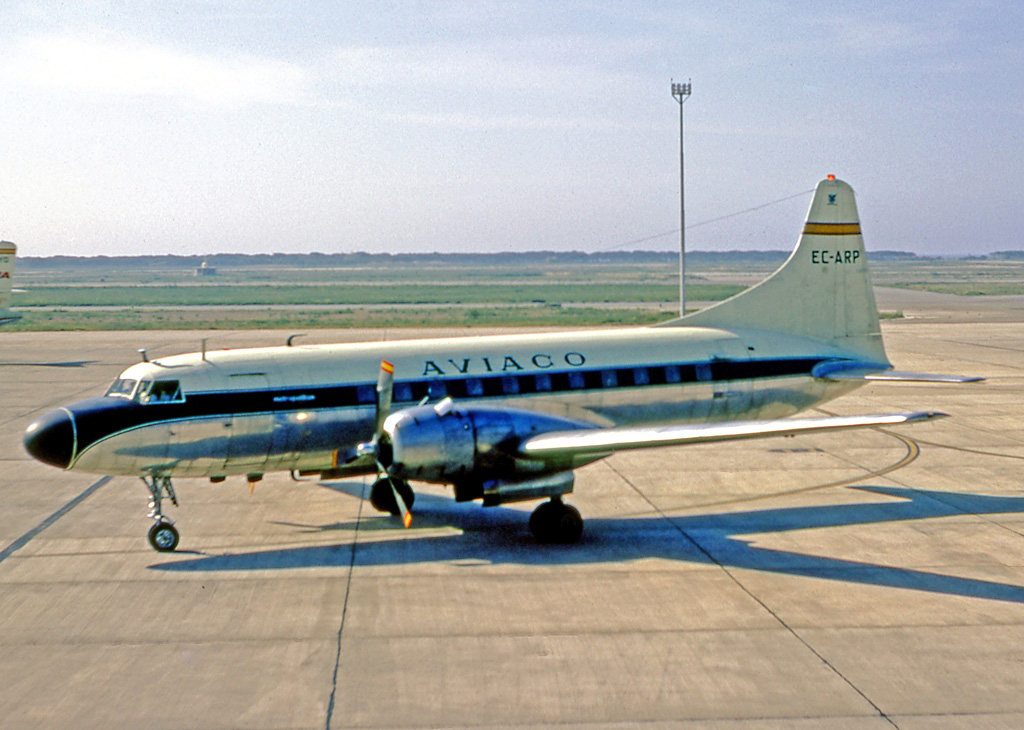
Aviaco Convair 440 at Barcelona Airport in 1970

The carrier was formed by Bilbao businessmen as a freight company on 18 February 1948. A group of local bankers provided the necessary funds for the acquisition of six Bristol 170s. Given that Iberia had exploited the most profitable domestic and international routes since the early 1940s, Aviaco restricted its operations to secondary routes. Scheduled passenger services started between Bilbao and Barcelona and Madrid. The first international route was Algiers–Palma–Marseille, while Canary Islands-based flights were launched shortly afterwards. In 1954, the airline won the contract for operating an airmail service between Madrid and Barcelona. In 1955, the airline's headquarters were transferred from Bilbao to Madrid, and the Instituto Nacional de Industria (INI) took over a majority interest in the company.

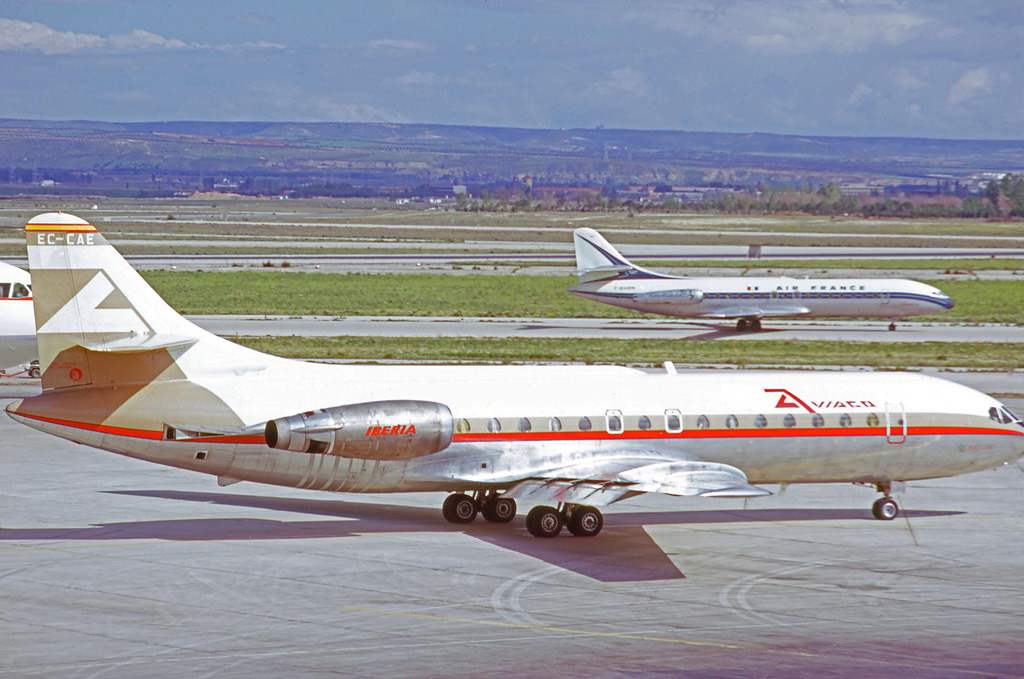
Sud Caravelle 10R of Aviaco at Madrid Barajas Airport in 1973

The financial structure of the company was re-organised in 1959, when the capital was halved to ESP 50 million, whereas Iberia injected ESP 100 million, becoming the owner of 2/3 of the shares, with the balance being split between the initial shareholders and INI. The move permitted Aviaco to acquire three second-hand Convair 440s from Sabena. These were the airline's first pressurized aircraft. By April 1960, the company had 702 employees; a fleet of three Bristol 170s, three Convair 440s, five Heron IIs and five Languedocs served a route network that included Barcelona, Brussels, Casablanca, Las Palmas, Madrid, Oran, Palma, Tangier, Santa Cruz de Tenerife and Tétouan. Two Convair 240s were bought from Varig in 1962. In early 1964, the carrier signed a contract with Aviation Traders for the conversion of two of its DC-4s into Carvairs; the first converted airframe was delivered in June the same year.

By 1965, a joint Aviaco-Iberia board was set up to coordinate aviation policies, which ensured that Aviaco and Iberia routes did not compete with each other.

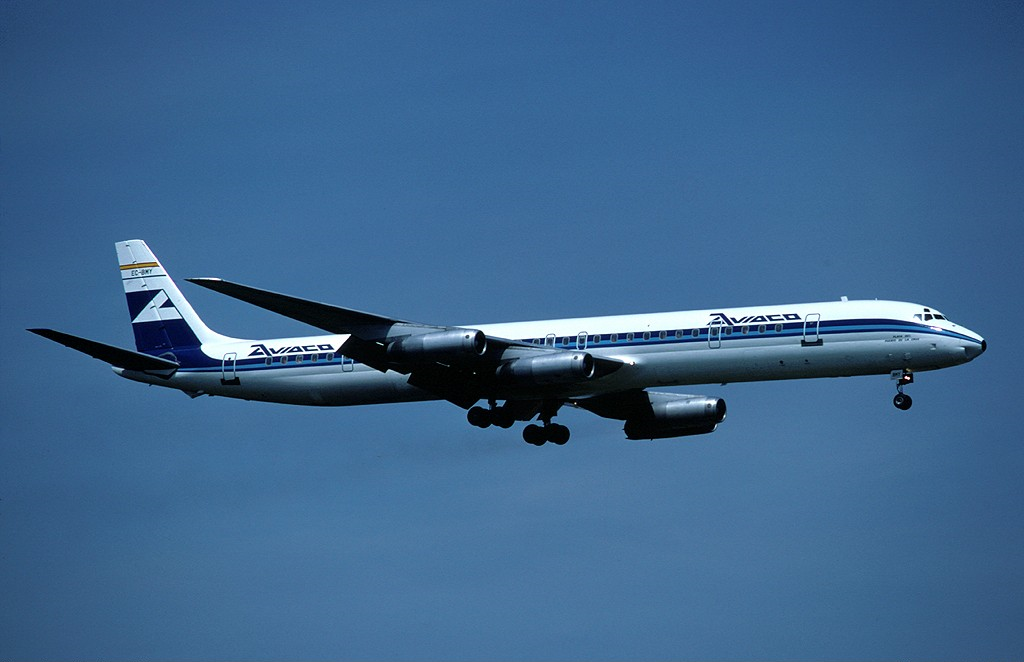
An Aviaco Douglas DC-8-63, 1981

In 1973, Aviaco became the 46th airline worldwide in ordering the McDonnell Douglas DC-9-30, when it acquired six aircraft of the type. In August 1974, two more DC-9-30s were ordered. By March 1975, the fleet consisted of four Caravelle 10Rs, five DC-8-50s, six DC-9-30s and six F-27s, whereas two more DC-9-30s were on order. At this time, the carrier had 764 employees and the route network included Algiers, Alicante, Barcelona, Bilbao, Córdoba, Ibiza, A Coruña, Las Palmas, Madrid, Mahón, Málaga, Oran, Oviedo, Palma, Pamplona, Santander, Santiago de Compostela, San Sebastián, Seville, Tenerife, Valencia and Vigo. In July 1975, four DC-9-33CFs were ordered; these four aircraft were handed over to the company within a month, with the first of them entering the fleet in May 1976, and the last in June. Valued at US$40 million, four more DC-9-30s were acquired in 1978. That year, Aviaco lost almost ESP 453 million. Another loss, equivalent to £3 million, was recorded for 1979, but these financial results were reverted in 1980, with the airline making a £5.5 million profit.

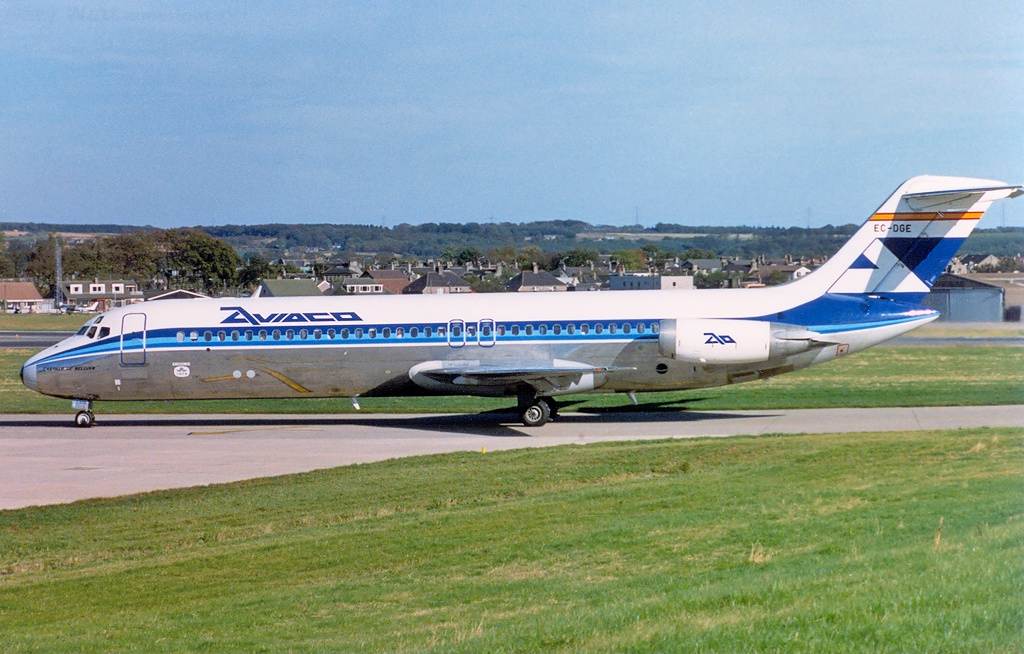
An Aviaco Douglas DC-9-34 at Aberdeen Airport in 1986.

In March 1980, the company had more than 1200 employees and it was 90%-owned by INI. Early in the decade, Aviaco incorporated five DC-8-63s that were phased out from Iberia's mainline fleet due to a renewal programme. Flight International informed in 1983 that the company had an initial order for 20 CN-235s, and that the order was boosted to 22 aircraft of the type late that year. By March 1985, the number of employees had grown to 1,751; the fleet comprised two DC-8-50Fs, 16 DC-9-30s, four DC-9-30Fs and nine Fokker F27-600s; the 22 CN-235s were still on order. During the decade, most of Aviaco shares were acquired by its competitor Iberia. From that time, Aviaco ran the less important domestic routes while Iberia served the international destinations and the most important national routes, such as the shuttle service Madrid-Barcelona. All the Aviaco technical, marketing and financial resources were transferred to Iberia. During this time, Aviaco had a fleet of Douglas DC-9 planes, which were painted in blue and white livery.

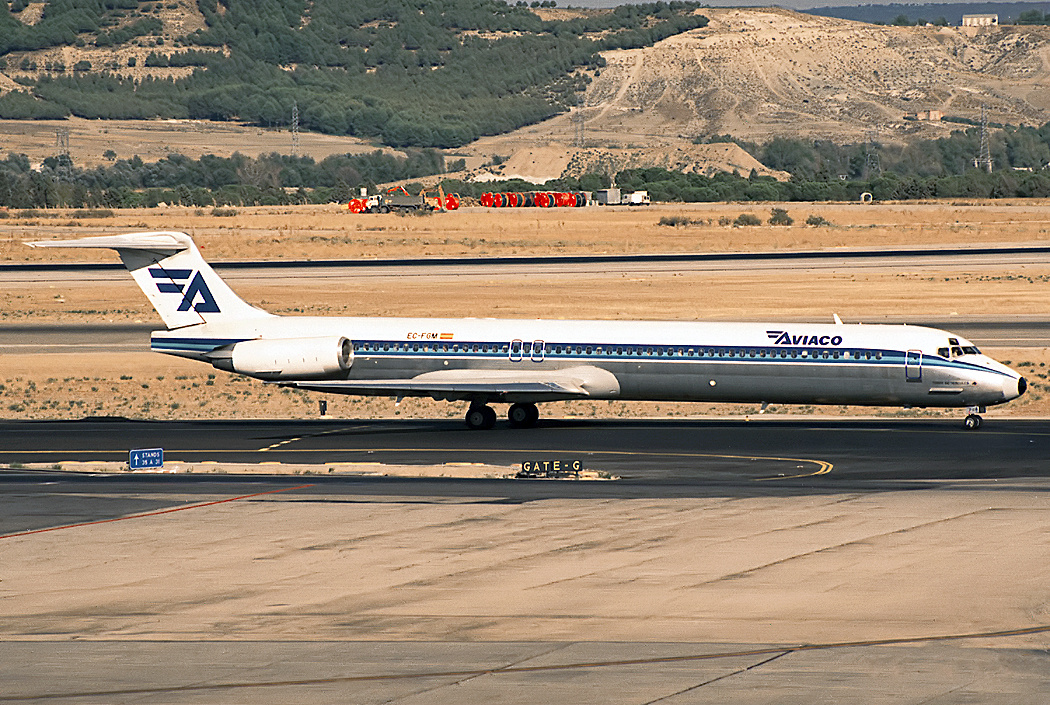
An Aviaco MD-88 at Madrid Barajas Airport in 1993.

During the 1990s, the Asturias–London Stansted, Valladolid–Paris, Zaragoza–London Stansted and Zaragoza–Paris routes were added to the existing ones radiating from Madrid and serving Almeria, Badajoz, Barcelona, Bilbao, Fuerteventura, Granada, Ibiza, Jerez de la Frontera, A Coruña, Lanzarote, Las Palmas, Málaga, Mallorca, Menorca, Murcia, Oviedo, Palma, Pamplona, Reus, San Sebastián, Santander, Seville, Tenerife, Valencia, Valladolid, Vigo, Vitoria-Gasteiz and Zaragoza. On March 1994, Aviaco had 1,696 employees and a fleet of eight Fokker F-27s, 20 McDonnell Douglas DC-9s and 13 MD-88s. Iberia's shareholding in Aviaco was boosted from 33% to 100% in 1998, when the Spanish flag carrier took control of 67% of the shares that were held by the SEPI. Since then, Iberia plans for Aviaco were to absorb it; this occurred on 1 September 1999.

During its heyday, Aviaco ("AO") was well known for operating charter flights primarily from Palma, Tenerife and Girona to almost every provincial airport in Europe, providing uplift for all major tour operators, such as Thomson, Enterprise, Cosmos and ILG. In fact, ILG's combined operations (Intasun, Lancaster, Global and Sol) signed an exclusive deal with AO to operate charters from all UK airports not covered by its own Air Europe brand. Aviaco earned itself a bad reputation in the international travel sector; it became known for its old aircraft (DC-9's), mediocre service and delays. However, the airline gained something of a cult status amongst travellers, who ultimately saw their Aviaco flight as part of the holiday experience.

During the mid-late 1980s, Aviaco sub-chartered aircraft from IBERIA to provide seasonal added capacity to its DC-9 fleet, which saw weekly forays of Iberia Boeing 727s, A300s and even Boeing 747-200s operating charter services on Aviaco's behalf into airports across Europe that had otherwise only handled 737 and DC9 sized aircraft up to that point.

== Accidents and incidents ==
Date	Location	Aircraft	Tail number	Aircraft damage	Fatalities	Description	Refs
24 November 1949	(Spain) Menorca	Bristol 170	EC-ADK	W/O	0	Overshot the runway on landing at Mahón Airport.	
4 December 1953	(Spain) Guadarrama	Bristol 170	EC-AEG	W/O	23/33	Crashed at Guadarrama. The aircraft was operating a domestic scheduled Bilbao–Madrid passenger service.	
29 September 1956	(Spain) Tenerife	SNCASE Languedoc	EC-AKV	W/O	1	The aircraft that was completing a domestic scheduled Málaga–Tenerife North passenger service, when it crashed on approach to Los Rodeos Airport, killing one person on the ground.	
9 May 1957	(Spain) Madrid	Bristol 170	EC-ADI	W/O	37/37	While on approach to Madrid-Barajas Airport on a domestic scheduled passenger service from Santiago de Compostela as Flight 111, the aircraft entered a spin, crashed and caught fire.	
14 April 1958	(Spain) Barcelona	de Havilland Heron	EC-ANJ	W/O	16/16	The aircraft had departed Zaragoza on a scheduled passenger service to Barcelona with 16 people on board. When another aircraft took off from Barcelona as the Heron was approaching, the Heron pilot made a sudden turn and the aircraft stalled and fell into the sea.	
4 December 1958	(Spain) Guadarrama	SNCASE Languedoc	EC-ANR	W/O	21/21	The aircraft had departed Vigo on a scheduled passenger service to Madrid with 21 people on board. Crashed into Sierra de Guadarrama and burst into flames, killing all occupants. Icing was the apparent cause of the accident.	
6 July 1972	(Spain) Gran Canaria	DC-8-52	EC-ARA	W/O	10/10	Operating as Flight 331, crashed into the sea for undetermined reason due to lack of flight recorders.	
13 August 1973	(Spain) A Coruña	Sud Aviation Caravelle	EC-BIC	W/O	86	One of the deadliest aircraft crashes in mainland Spain occurred when Flight 118, a Sud Aviation Caravelle, hit eucalyptus trees on approach to A Coruña Airport due to pilot error, crashed to the ground, striking several houses, and then burned out, killing all 85 people on board and one person on the ground.	
7 December 1983	(Spain) Madrid	DC-9-32	EC-CGS	W/O	93	The Madrid runway disaster took place at Barajas Airport when an Aviaco Douglas DC-9-32 that was taxiing for departure to Santander entered the active runway at the same time an outbound Iberia Boeing 727-200 was taking off for Rome, running along the very same runway the Aviaco aircraft had taxied into. The two aircraft collided in dense fog, killing all 42 occupants of the DC-9 and 51 of the 93 people aboard the Boeing 727.	
30 March 1992	(Spain) Granada	DC-9-32	EC-BYH	W/O	0	Hard landing at Granada Airport. The aircraft was completing a domestic Madrid–Granada passenger service as Flight 231.	
21 March 1994	(Spain) Vigo	DC-9-32	EC-CLE	W/O	0	One of the wings hit approach lights on landing at Vigo Airport. The aircraft landed some 50 metres (160 ft) short of the runway, causing both main gears to separate and the airframe to slide for almost 600 metres (2,000 ft) before coming to rest. A fire erupted due to a fuel leak. The aircraft was completing a domestic Madrid–Vigo passenger service as Flight 260.	

== See also ==
- History of Iberia (airline)
- Transport in Spain
