= Aviaco Flight 260 =

1994 passenger plane crash in Vigo

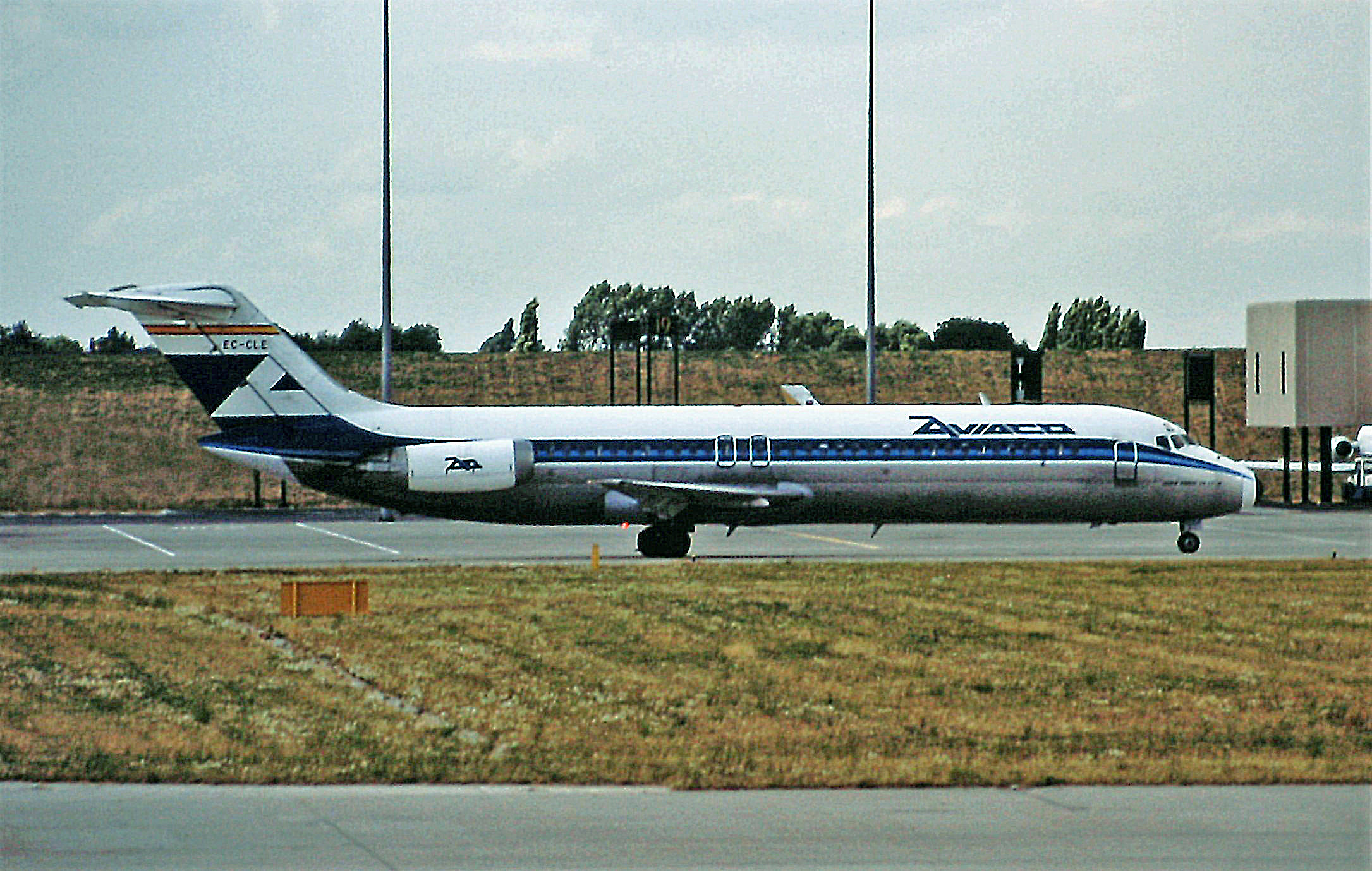
- EC-CLE, the aircraft involved in the accident, pictured in 1984

Accident
- Date: 21 March 1994
- Summary: Descend under the glide path in low visibility and fog due to pilot error
- Site: Vigo–Peinador Airport, Vigo, Spain

Aircraft
- Aircraft type: McDonnell Douglas DC-9-32
- Aircraft name: Juan Ponce de Leon
- Operator: Aviaco
- IATA flight No.: AO260
- ICAO flight No.: AYC260
- Call sign: AVIACO 260
- Registration: EC-CLE
- Flight origin: Madrid–Barajas Airport, Madrid, Spain
- Destination: Vigo–Peinador Airport, Vigo, Spain
- Occupants: 116
- Passengers: 110
- Crew: 6
- Fatalities: 0
- Injuries: 62
- Survivors: 116

Aviaco Flight 260, also known as the Peinador Accident, was a scheduled domestic passenger flight from Madrid–Barajas Airport to Vigo Airport. On 21 March 1994, the McDonnell Douglas DC-9-32 crashed approximately 75 meters short of the runway. All 116 occupants survived the crash.

Among the passengers were Socialist deputy Ventura Pérez Mariño, trade unionist Antonio Gutiérrez, the mayor of Redondela Xaime Rei, and mountaineer César Pérez de Tudela.

== Aircraft and crew ==
The aircraft, nicknamed Juan Ponce de Leon, was a McDonnell Douglas DC-9-32, manufactured in 1975, registered as EC-CLE. It was equipped with two Pratt & Whitney JT8D-9A engines. Prior to the accident, the plane had acquired 38,224 flight hours.

The pilot-in-command of the flight was José Luis López Hernández, aged 44, hired by Aviaco in 1980, and had acquired a total of 9,220 flight hours, of which 7,304 were on the McDonnell Douglas DC-9.

The 45-year-old co-pilot was hired by Aviaco in 1993 and had accumulated a total of 5,502 flight hours, including 1,502 hours on the DC-9.

The 44-year-old flight inspector was hired by Aviaco in 1980, and had acquired a total of 11,957 flight hours, including 3,213 hours on the DC-9.

== Accident ==
Map showing the movement of the plane

The flight took off from Madrid-Barajas Airport at 07:21 PM local time. The flight was uneventful. On approach to Vigo-Peinador Airport, the crew informed air traffic control that they intended to perform an instrument approach to runway 20. ATC granted permission to land on runway 20, stating "VOR on final" and giving the crew the wind conditions, the visual range, and the runway conditions. The crew initiated their final approach at an altitude of approximately 3,600 feet. At 8:15 PM, the crew reported runway in sight and was cleared to land on runway 20. After the crew acknowledged the landing clearance, this was the last communication from the aircraft. The plane then struck the approach lights, approximately 115 meters from the runway threshold and impacted the ground about 50 meters short of the touchdown point, causing the landing gears to collapse. The aircraft came to rest about 600 meters from the runway threshold, with the fire spreading to the left side and affecting almost the entire exterior of the aircraft.

As the aircraft approached the runway, a nearby vehicle reported an emergency. The tower immediately activated the alarm, and the fire service arrived a minute later. Since the occupants were already being evacuated, the firefighters began working on the left side to shield the evacuation, which was nearly complete. After extinguishing the fire on both sides, some of the firefighters equipped with Oxygen masks entered the aircraft to find that no one remained. All the passengers and crew had evacuated safely from the aircraft. There were no fatalities among the 110 passengers and 6 cabin crew members, although 62 occupants were injured, 3 severely. Most of the passengers suffered from burns and contusions.

== Investigation ==
The Comision De Investigacion De Accidentes De Aviacion Civil of Spain investigated the cause of the accident. Analysis showed that at the moment the crew started their final approach to the runway, they were slightly above the glideslope but relatively on track towards the runway. It was found that the aircraft had descended below the glidepath during the approach to Vigo-Peinador Airport approximately 10 seconds prior to impact. At an altitude of 125 feet, the "Glide Slope" alarm from the Ground Proximity Warning System sounded during this time, but the crew failed to hear or respond to the warning alarm. 5 seconds prior to impact, at an altitude of 60 feet, the alarms changed to a "Sink Rate" alarm until the aircraft was 50 feet above the ground, where the alarm changed for a third time to a "Whoop, whoop, pull up" alert, 2 seconds prior to impact, indicating that a collision with terrain was imminent. As well, it was also found that at the time the crew transmitted a message to ATC stating that they had the runway in sight, thick fog obscured their view of the runway ahead and the crew lost sight of it. This could have caused the pilots to become spatially disoriented, having no visual references, and felt that they were in an ascent, explaining the increase in the rate of descent in the final seconds prior to impact. The excessive descent rate caused the GPWS system to signal an "excessive descent" alarm but the crew failed to hear this alarm as well. As well, the crew was continually increasing the rate of descent up until impact and maintained a steady rate of descent (approximately 850 feet per minute) until the minimum altitude, at which point the descent rate was decreased slightly before it was increased again only steeper, reaching an average of 1,035 feet per minute. This was in violation of aviation guidelines, which stated that the rate of descent must be decreased upon reaching the minimum altitude. In addition, due to the reduced visibility because of the fog, the crew may have misinterpreted the approach path lights as the lights of the runway, which is why the aircraft impacted the ground just short of the runway threshold. This could have been caused by the crew's expectation of seeing a runway and interpreted the first lights that appeared through the fog as the runway lights, causing them to ignore all other signs the aircraft was flying too low and not on the correct approach path. Their focus on spotting the runway caused them to "cancel out" all other stimuli such as the aural warnings.

The final report concluded that the cause of the crash was the crew going against company procedures by increasing their descent rate in reduced visibility, despite not being able to see the runway and their failure to maintain a steady rate of descent and a stabilized approach.

The CIAAC also implemented several recommendations as a result of the accident:

1. The use of cockpit microphones and headsets must be mandatory in all aircraft and the sterile cockpit rule must be applied up until an altitude of 10,000 feet, with the crew only engaging in discussions relevant to the flight and eliminate all non-pertinent conversation about matters unrelated to flying the aircraft. As well, cockpit microphones should record the conversations and sounds from a headset for an additional crew member, if applicable.
2. Installing flight recorders with better audio quality and easier retrieval of data
3. Crew should be trained on the use of GPWS in emergency situations/scenarios
4. Airline operators should closely monitor the procedures for an instrument approach to the runway
