= Aviaco Flight 331 =

1972 aviation accident in Spain

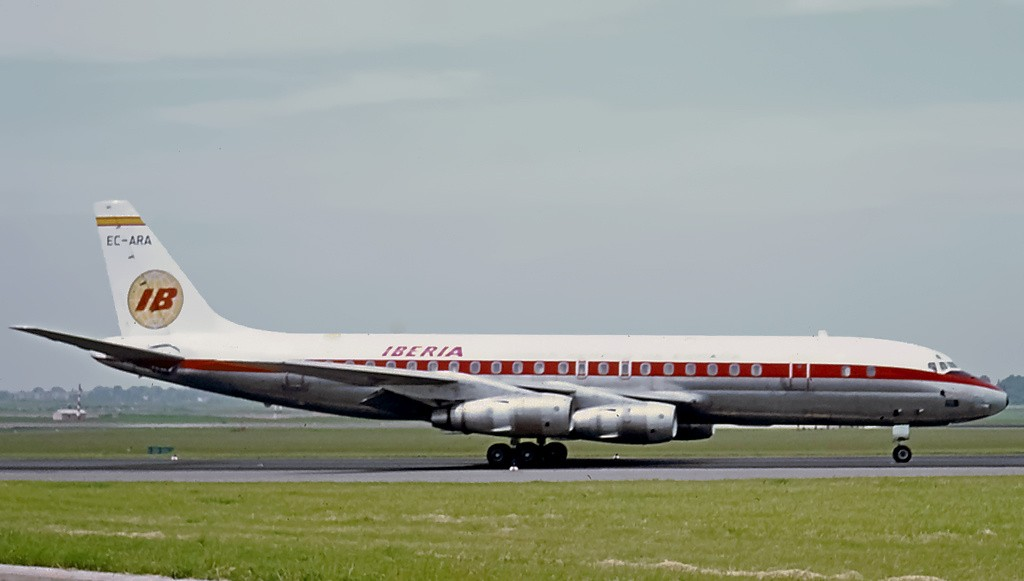
- EC-ARA, the aircraft involved in the accident, seen in June 1972

Accident
- Date: 6 July 1972
- Summary: Crashed during approach for undertermined reason
- Site: Gando, Gran Canaria, Spain

Aircraft
- Aircraft type: Douglas DC-8-52
- Aircraft name: Velázquez
- Operator: Aviaco
- Registration: EC-ARA
- Flight origin: Madrid–Barajas Airport, Madrid, Spain
- Destination: Gran Canaria Airport, Gran Canaria, Spain
- Occupants: 10
- Passengers: 0
- Crew: 10
- Fatalities: 10
- Survivors: 0

Aviaco Flight 331 was a repositioning flight from Madrid, Spain, to Gran Canaria, Spain. On July 6, 1972, the DC-8 crashed into the sea near Gando while attempting to land at Gran Canaria Airport. All ten crew members on board were killed.

== Aircraft ==
During the summer season, Aviaco leased aircraft from Iberia to operate charter flights. In the summer of 1972, one of these aircraft was the DC-8 Velázquez. It was one of the first three jet aircraft enter service in Spain, being delivered to Iberia in 1961.

== Accident ==
In the early morning of July 6, 1972, the flight was operated so that the aircraft could begin service from Gran Canaria with a charter flight to Hamburg, Germany, scheduled for the following day.

As the approach began, at approximately 1:50 a.m, the aircraft was flying at an altitude of about 2,500 feet and approximately 22 kilometers northeast of Gando when it crashed into the sea. Minutes earlier, it had maintained routine radio contact with the airport control tower without reporting any problems or anomalies.

At approximately 9:10 a.m. that same day, the Air Ministry's search and rescue services located the wreckage of the aircraft on the seabed at a depth of more than 1,500 meters. The black box was never recovered. All ten crew members on board died.

== Cause ==
The official cause of the accident was never determined because the flight recorder was not recovered, owing to the difficulty of accessing the deep-water wreckage site.

One media outlet covering the accident quoted a witness who said the aircraft had crashed into the sea at high speed.
