= 1958 Aviaco SNCASE Languedoc crash =

Plane crash in the Guadarrama Mountains which killed 21

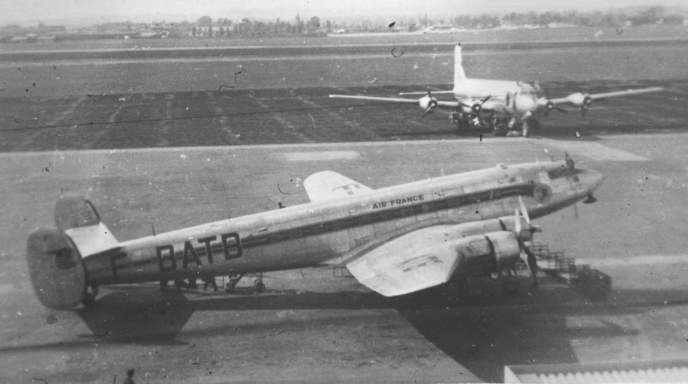
- SNCASE Languedoc of Air France, similar to the accident aircraft

Accident
- Date: 4 December 1958
- Summary: Controlled flight into terrain
- Site: La Losa, Guadarrama Mountains, Province of Segovia (Spain); 40.79419°N 4.11963°W

Aircraft
- Aircraft type: SNCASE Languedoc
- Operator: Aviaco
- Registration: EC-ANR
- Flight origin: Vigo Airport
- Destination: Barajas Airport, Madrid
- Passengers: 16
- Crew: 5
- Fatalities: 21
- Survivors: 0

The 1958 Aviaco SNCASE Languedoc crash occurred on 4 December 1958 when a SNCASE Languedoc of Aviaco crashed into the La Rodilla de la Mujer Muerta mountain, in the Guadarrama Mountains, Spain, killing all 21 people on board. The aircraft was operating a domestic scheduled passenger flight from Vigo Airport to Barajas Airport, Madrid.

== Aircraft ==
The accident aircraft was SNCASE Languedoc msn 28, registration EC-ANR.

== Accident ==
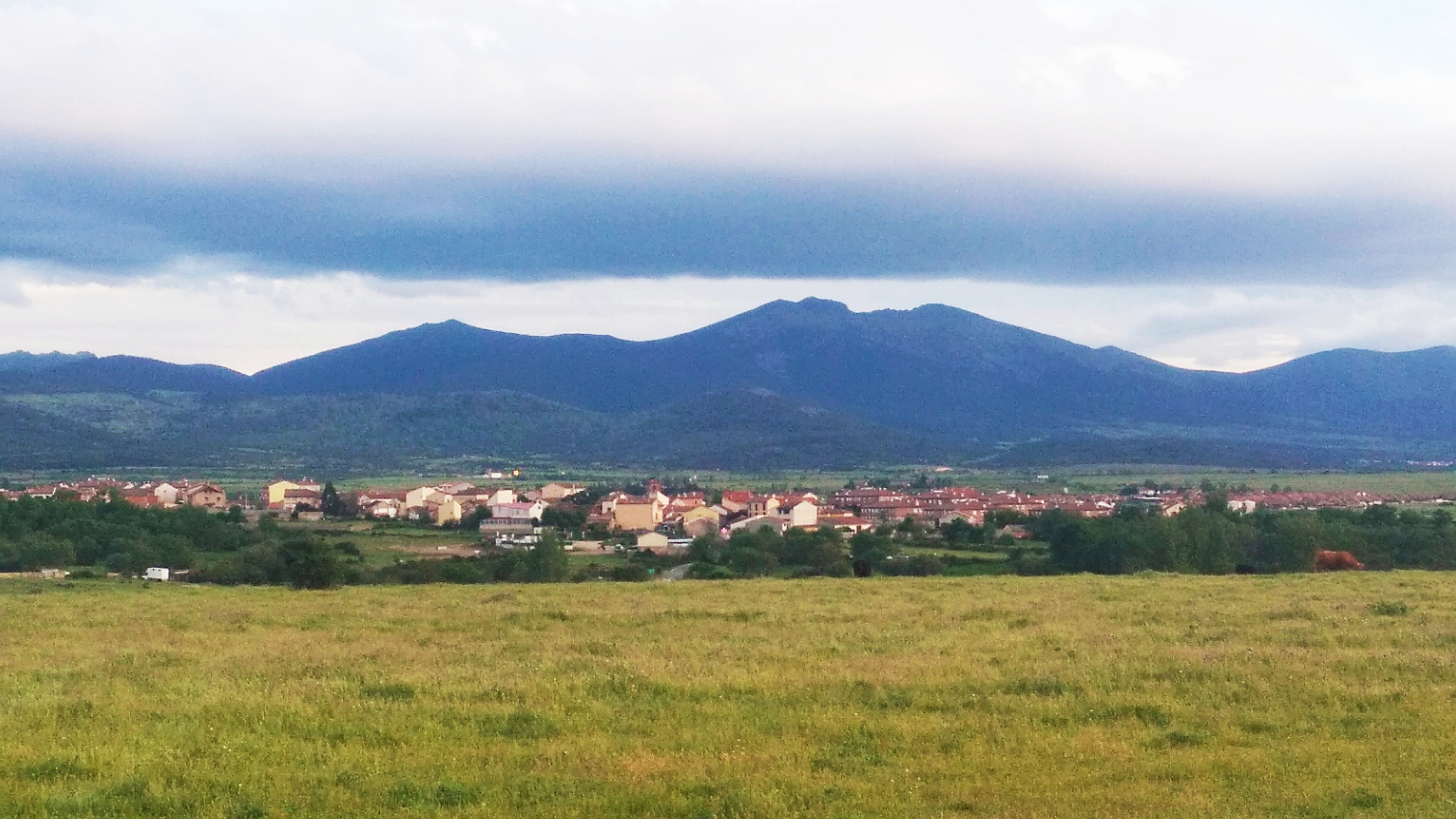
La Mujer Muerta Mountain, the accident taking place on the far left

The aircraft departed from Vigo Airport at 15:40 local time on 4 December 1958 bound for Barajas Airport, Madrid. At 17:15, the aircraft was instructed to contact the control tower at Barajas and remain at Flight Level 95. In the next five minutes, the aircraft crashed into the 1,999-metre (6,558 ft) high La Rodilla de la Mujer Muerta mountain, in the Guadarrama Mountains. All five crew and seventeen passengers on board were killed. The search for the aircraft was hampered by inclement weather, with fog, snow, high winds and torrential rain reported.

The cause of the accident was that the pilot flew too low whilst trying to descend out of icing conditions. A navigational error may also have contributed to the accident.
