= McDonnell Douglas DC-9 =

Jet airliner, produced 1965-1982

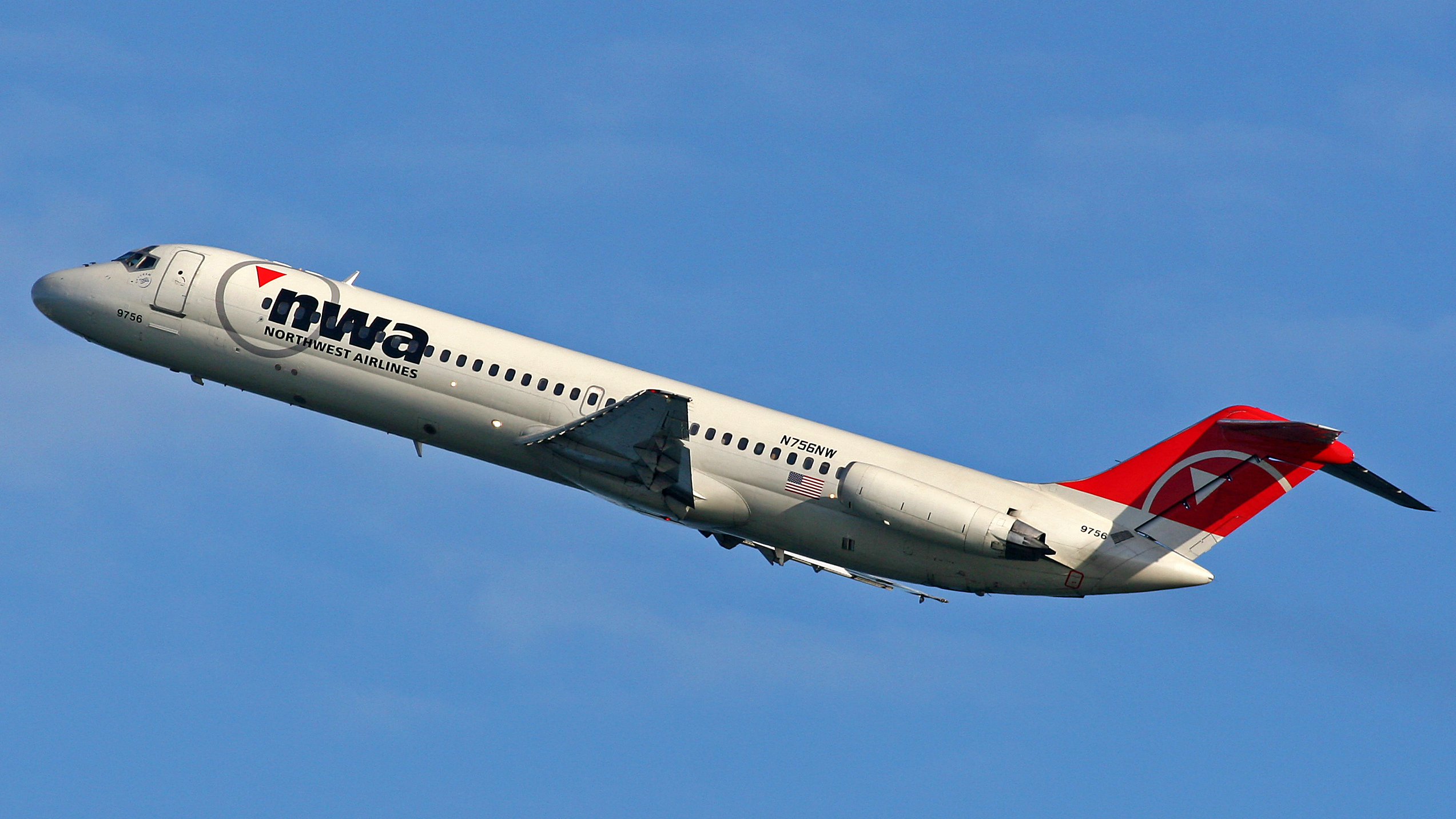
- A Northwest Airlines DC-9-40 in 2007.

General information
- Type: Narrow-body jet airliner
- National origin: United States
- Manufacturer: Douglas Aircraft Company (1965‍–‍1967); McDonnell Douglas (1967–1982)
- Status: In limited service for passenger transport, cargo transport and private use
- Primary users: Aeronaves TSM Delta Air Lines (historical); Scandinavian Airlines (historical); Northwest Airlines (historical)
- Number built: 976

History
- Manufactured: 1965–1982
- Introduction date: December 8, 1965, with Delta Air Lines
- First flight: February 25, 1965
- Variant: McDonnell Douglas C-9
- Developed into: McDonnell Douglas MD-80

The McDonnell Douglas DC-9 is an American five-abreast, single-aisle aircraft designed by the Douglas Aircraft Company. It was initially produced as the Douglas DC-9 before August 1967, when the company merged with McDonnell Aircraft to become McDonnell Douglas.

Even before the introduction of its first jetliner, the high-capacity Douglas DC-8, in 1959, Douglas was interested in producing an aircraft suited to smaller routes. As early as 1958, design studies were made; approval for the DC-9, a smaller all-new jetliner, came on April 8, 1963. The DC-9-10 first flew on February 25, 1965, and got its type certificate on November 23, to enter service with Delta Air Lines on December 8.

The DC-9 is powered by two rear-mounted Pratt & Whitney JT8D low-bypass turbofan engines under a T-tail for a cleaner wing aerodynamic. It has a two-person flight deck and built-in airstairs to better suit smaller airports. It was capable of taking off from 5,000-foot (1,500-metre) runways, connecting small cities and towns where jet service was previously impossible. The Series 10 aircraft are 104 ft (32 m) long for typically 90 coach seats. The Series 30, stretched by 15 ft (4.6 m) to seat 115 in economy, has a larger wing and more powerful engines for a higher maximum takeoff weight (MTOW); it first flew in August 1966 and entered service in February 1967. The Series 20 has the Series 10 fuselage, more powerful engines, and the Series 30's improved wings; it first flew in September 1968 and entered service in January 1969. The Series 40 was further lengthened by 6 ft (1.8 m) for 125 passengers, and the final DC-9-50 series first flew in 1974, stretched again by 8 ft (2.4 m) for 135 passengers. When deliveries ended in October 1982, 976 had been built. Smaller variants competed with the BAC One-Eleven, Fokker F28, and Sud Aviation Caravelle, and larger ones with the original Boeing 737.

The original DC-9 was followed by the second generation in 1980, the MD-80 series, a lengthened DC-9-50 with a larger wing and a higher MTOW. This was further developed into the third generation, the MD-90, in the early 1990s, as the fuselage was stretched again, fitted with V2500 high-bypass turbofans, and an updated flight deck. The shorter and final version, the MD-95, was renamed the Boeing 717 after McDonnell Douglas's merger with Boeing in 1997; it is powered by Rolls-Royce BR715 engines. The DC-9 family was produced between 1965 and 2006 with a total delivery of 2441 units: 976 DC-9s, 1191 MD-80s, 116 MD-90s, and 155 Boeing 717s. As of August 2022, 250 aircraft remain in service: 31 DC-9s (freighter), 116 MD-80s (mainly freighter), and 103 Boeing 717s (passenger), while the MD-90 was retired without freighter conversion.

== Development ==
=== Origins ===
During the late 1950s, Douglas Aircraft studied a short- to medium-range airliner to complement their then-sole jetliner, the high-capacity, long-range DC-8 (DC stands for Douglas Commercial). The Model 2067, a four-engined aircraft sized for medium-range routes was studied in depth, but work on it was abandoned after the proposal did not receive enough interest from airlines. In 1960, Douglas signed a two-year contract with the French aeronautics company Sud Aviation for technical cooperation; under the terms of this contract, Douglas would market and support the Sud Aviation Caravelle and produce a licensed version if sufficient orders were forthcoming from airlines. However, none were ever ordered from the company, leading to Douglas returning to its design studies after the co-operation deal expired.

In 1962, design studies were underway into what would become the DC-9, known as Model 2086. The first envisioned version seated 63 passengers and had a gross weight of 69,000 lb (31,300 kg). This design was changed into what would be the initial DC-9 variant. During February 1963, detailed design work commenced. On April 8, 1963, Douglas announced that it would proceed with the DC-9. Shortly thereafter, Delta Air Lines placed the initial order for the DC-9, ordering 15 aircraft along with options for another 15. By January 1965, Douglas had garnered orders for 58 DC-9 as well as options for a further 44.

Unlike the competing but larger Boeing 727 trijet, which used as many 707 components as possible, the DC-9 was developed as an all-new design. Throughout its development, Douglas had placed considerable emphasis on making the airliner as economic as possible, as well as to facilitate its future growth. The adoption of the Pratt & Whitney JT8D low-bypass turbofan engine, which had already been developed for the Boeing 727, enabled Douglas to benefit from the preexisting investment. Pratt & Whitney had long collaborated with Douglas on various projects, thus their engine was a natural choice for the company. In order to reduce the considerable financial burden of its development, Douglas implemented one of the first shared-risk production arrangements for the DC-9, arranging for de Havilland Canada to produce the wing at its own financial cost in return for promises on prospective future production orders.

=== Entry into service ===
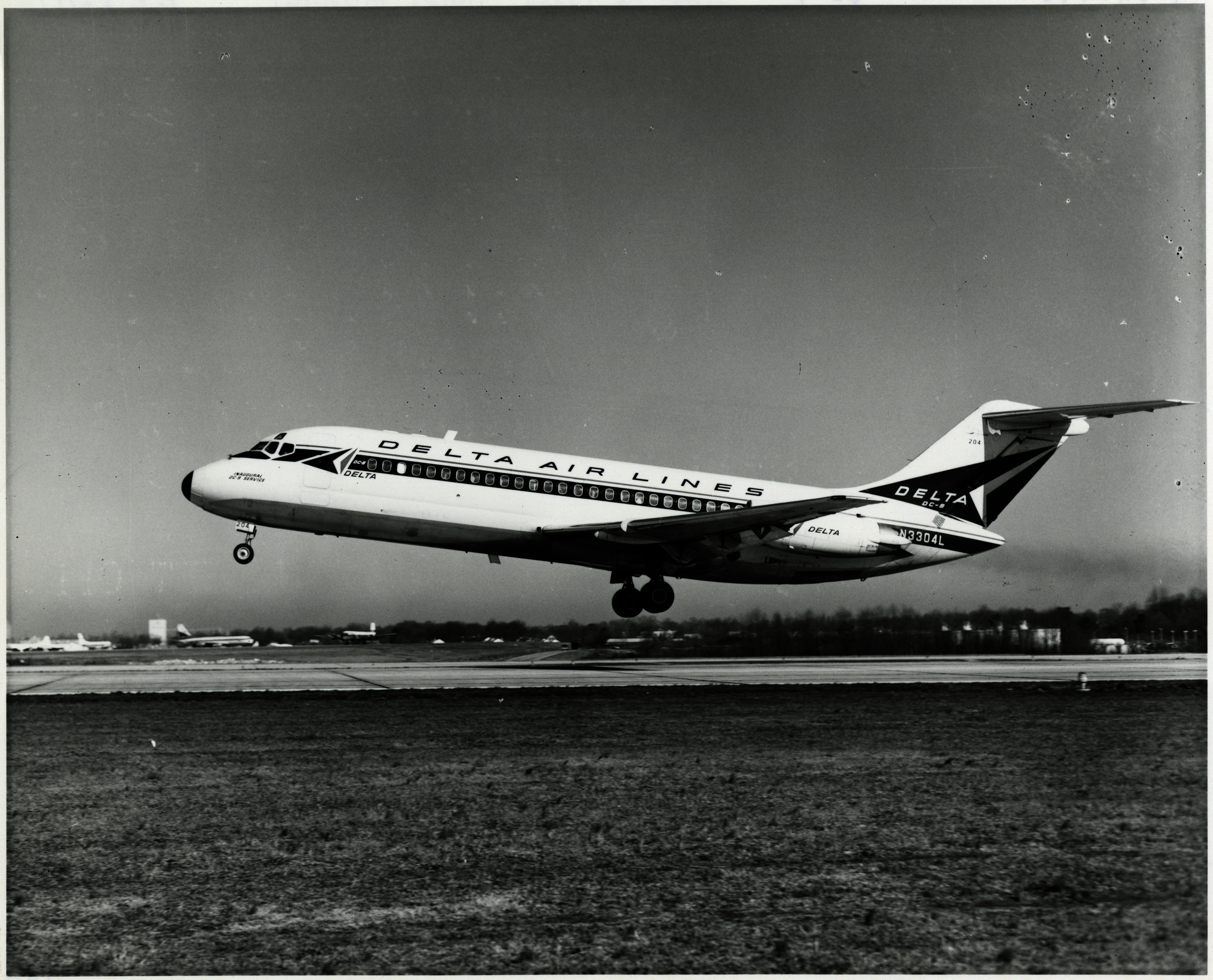
The DC-9 entered service with Delta Air Lines on December 8, 1965.

The pace of development on the program was rapid. The first DC-9, a production model, flew on February 25, 1965. The second DC-9 flew a few weeks later, with a test fleet of five aircraft flying by July. Several key refinements to the aircraft were made during flight testing, such as the replacement of the original leading-edge slat design to achieve lower drag. The flight test program proceeded at a rapid pace; the initial Series 10 received airworthiness certification from the Federal Aviation Administration on November 23, 1965, permitting it to enter service with Delta Air Lines on December 8.

Through the DC-9, Douglas had beaten rival company Boeing and their 737 to enter the short-haul jet market, a key factor that contributed to the DC-9 becoming the best selling airliner in the world for a time. By May 1976, the company had delivered 726 aircraft of the DC-9 family, which was more than double the number of its nearest competitor. However, following decades of intense competition between the two airliners, the DC-9 would eventually be overtaken as the world's best selling airliner by Boeing's 737.

From the onset of its development, the DC-9 had been intended to be available in multiple versions to suit varying customer requirements; the first stretched version, the Series 30, with a longer fuselage and extended wing tips, flew on August 1, 1966, entering service with Eastern Air Lines in 1967. The initial Series 10 was followed by the improved -20, -30, and -40 variants. The final DC-9 series was the -50, which first flew in 1974.

=== Production ===
The DC-9 series, the first generation of the DC-9 family, would become a long term commercial success for the manufacturer. However, early production of the type had come at a higher unit cost than had been anticipated, leading to DC-9s being sold at a loss. The unfavorable early economics of the type negatively impacted Douglas, pushing it into fiscal hardship. However, the high customer demand for the DC-9 made the company attractive for either an acquisition or a merger; Douglas would merge with the American aerospace company McDonnell Aircraft to form McDonnell Douglas in 1967.

The DC-9 family is one of the longest-lasting aircraft in production and operation. It was produced on the final assembly line in Long Beach, California, beginning in 1965, and later was on a common line with the second generation of the DC-9 family, the MD-80, with which it shares its line number sequence. Following the delivery of 976 DC-9s and 108 MD-80s, McDonnell Douglas stopped series production of the DC-9 in December 1982. The last member of the DC-9 family, the Boeing 717, was produced until 2006. The DC-9 family was produced in total 2441 units: 976 DC-9s (first generation), 1191 MD-80s (second generation), 116 MD-90s, and 155 Boeing 717s (third generation). This compared to 2,970 Airbus A320s and 5,270 Boeing 737s delivered as of 2006.

=== Enhancement studies ===
Studies aimed at further improving DC-9 fuel efficiency, by means of retrofitted wingtips of various types, were undertaken by McDonnell Douglas, but these did not demonstrate significant benefits, especially with existing fleets shrinking. The wing design makes retrofitting difficult. Between 1973 and 1975, McDonnell Douglas studied the possibility of replacing engines on the DC-9 with the JT8D-109 turbofan, a quieter and more efficient variant of the JT8D. This progressed to the flight-test stage, and tests achieved noise reduction between 8 and 9 decibels depending on the phase of flight. No further aircraft were modified, and the test aircraft was re-equipped with standard JT8D-9s prior to delivery to its airline customer.

=== Further developments (DC-9 family) ===
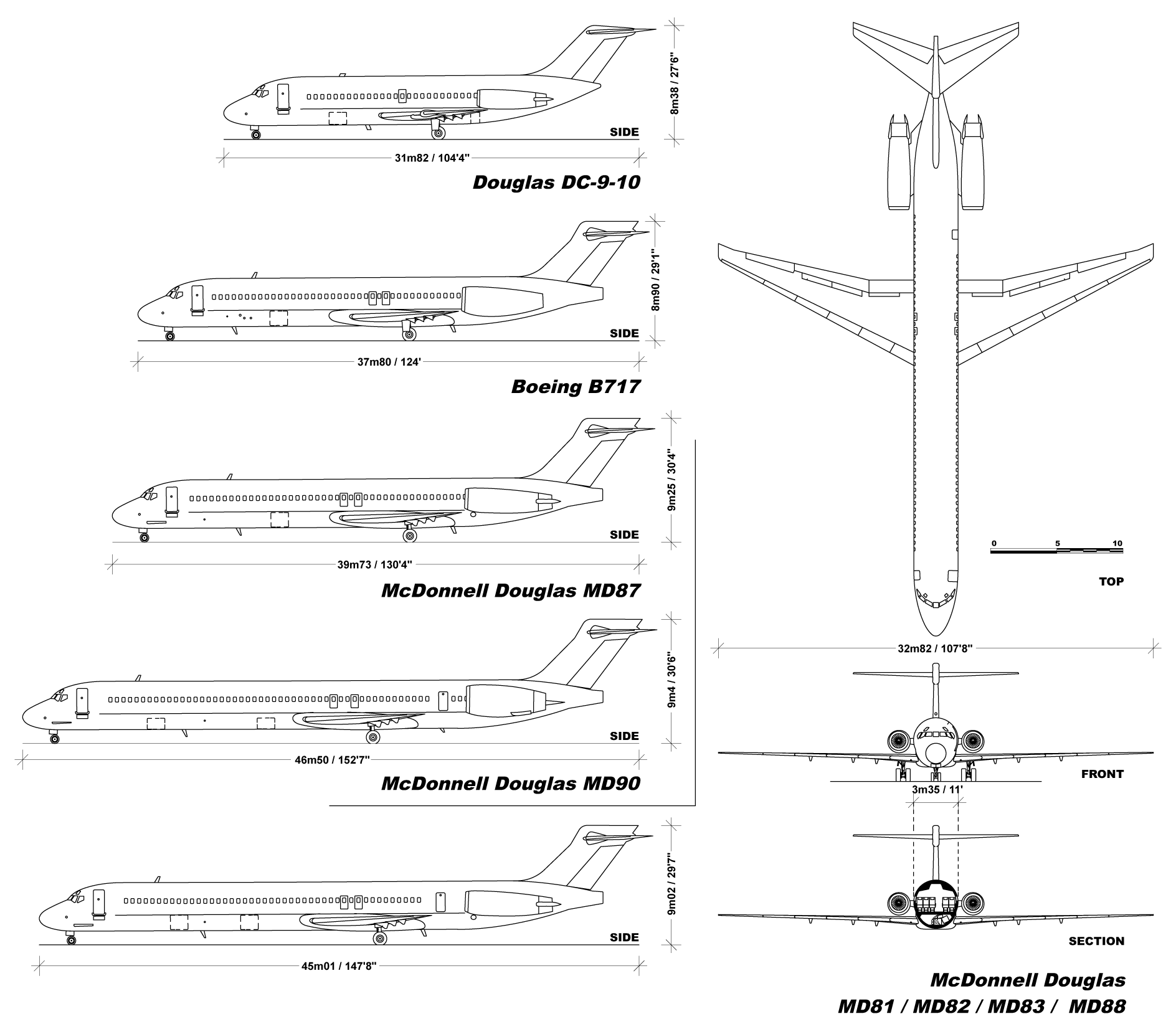
The DC-9 family development: the early DC-9, subsequent MD-80, later MD-90 and the final Boeing 717

Two further developments of the original or first generation DC-9 series used the new designation with McDonnell Douglas initials (MD- prefix) followed by the year of development. The first derivative or second generation was the MD-80 series and the second derivative or third generation was the MD-90 series. Together, they formed the DC-9 family of 12 aircraft members (variants), and if the DC-9- designation were retained, the family members would be: First generation (Series 10, Series 20, Series 30, Series 40, and Series 50), second generation (Series 81, Series 82, Series 83, Series 87, and Series 88), and third generation (Series 90 and Series 95). The Series 10 (DC-9-10) was the smallest family member and the Series 90 (MD-90) was the largest.

==== Second generation (MD-80 series) ====
The original DC-9 series was followed in 1980 by the introduction of the second generation of the DC-9 family, the MD-80 series. This was originally called the DC-9-80 (short Series 80 and later stylized Super 80). It was a lengthened DC-9-50 with a higher maximum takeoff weight (MTOW), a larger wing, new main landing gear, and higher fuel capacity. The MD-80 series features a number of variants of the JT8D turbofan engine that had higher thrust ratings than those available on the original DC-9 series. The MD-80 series includes the MD-81, MD-82, MD-83, MD-88, and shortest variant, the MD-87.

==== Third generation (MD-90 series) ====
MD-90

The MD-80 series was further developed into the third generation, the MD-90 series, in the early 1990s. It has yet another fuselage stretch, an electronic flight instrument system (first introduced on the MD-88), and completely new International Aero V2500 high-bypass turbofan engines. In comparison to the very successful MD-80, relatively few MD-90s were built.

Boeing 717 (MD-95)

The shorter and final variant, the MD-95, was renamed the Boeing 717 after McDonnell Douglas's merger with Boeing in 1997 and before aircraft deliveries began. The fuselage length and wing are very similar to those of the DC-9-30, but much use was made of lighter, modern materials. Power is supplied by two BMW/Rolls-Royce BR715 high-bypass turbofan engines.

Comac ARJ21 (C909)

China's Comac ARJ21 (C909) is derived from the DC-9 family. The ARJ21/C909 is built with manufacturing tooling from the MD-90 Trunkliner program. As a consequence, it has the same fuselage cross-section, nose profile, and tail.

== Design ==
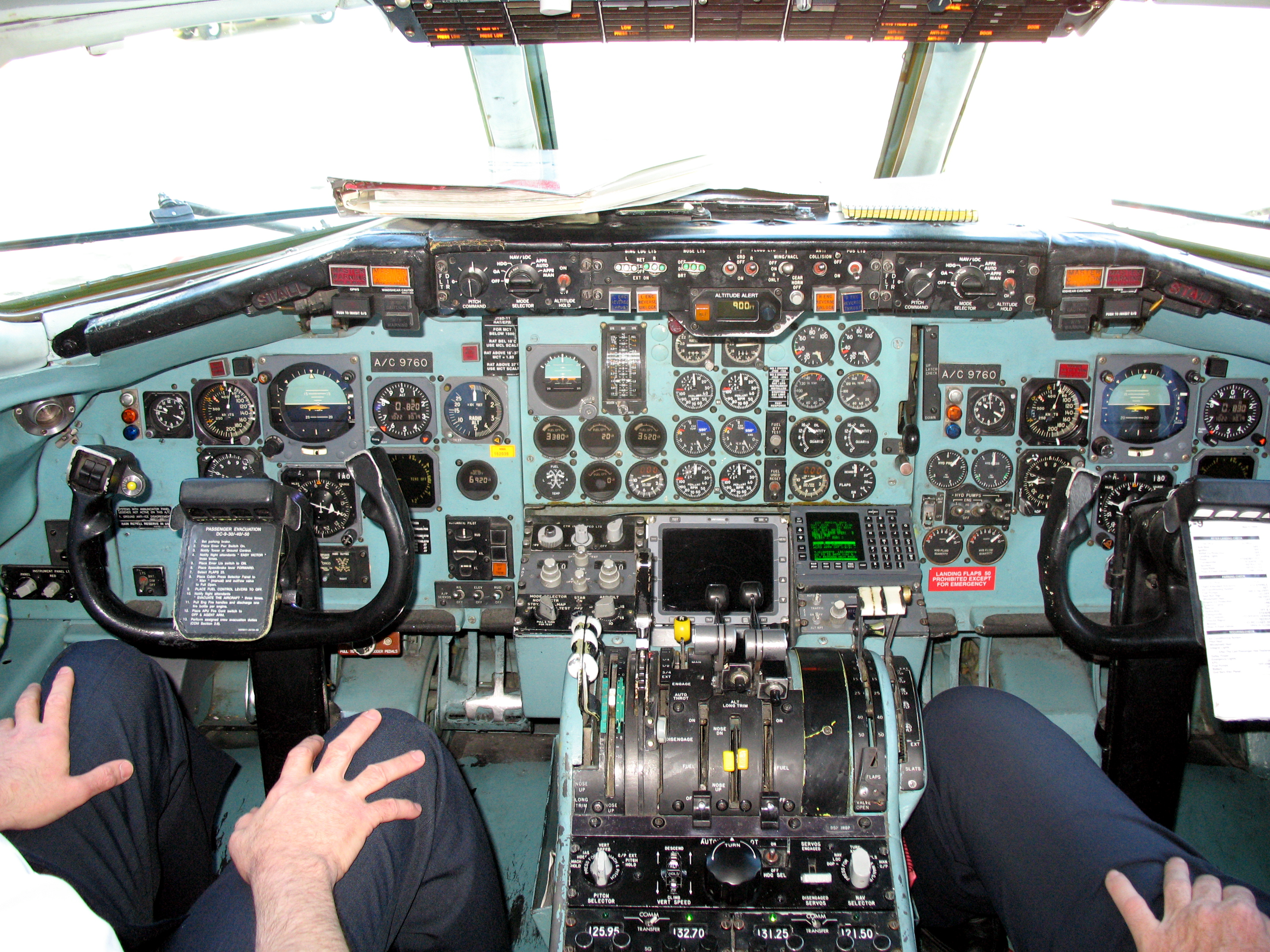
A DC-9's two-person cockpit with analog instrument panel

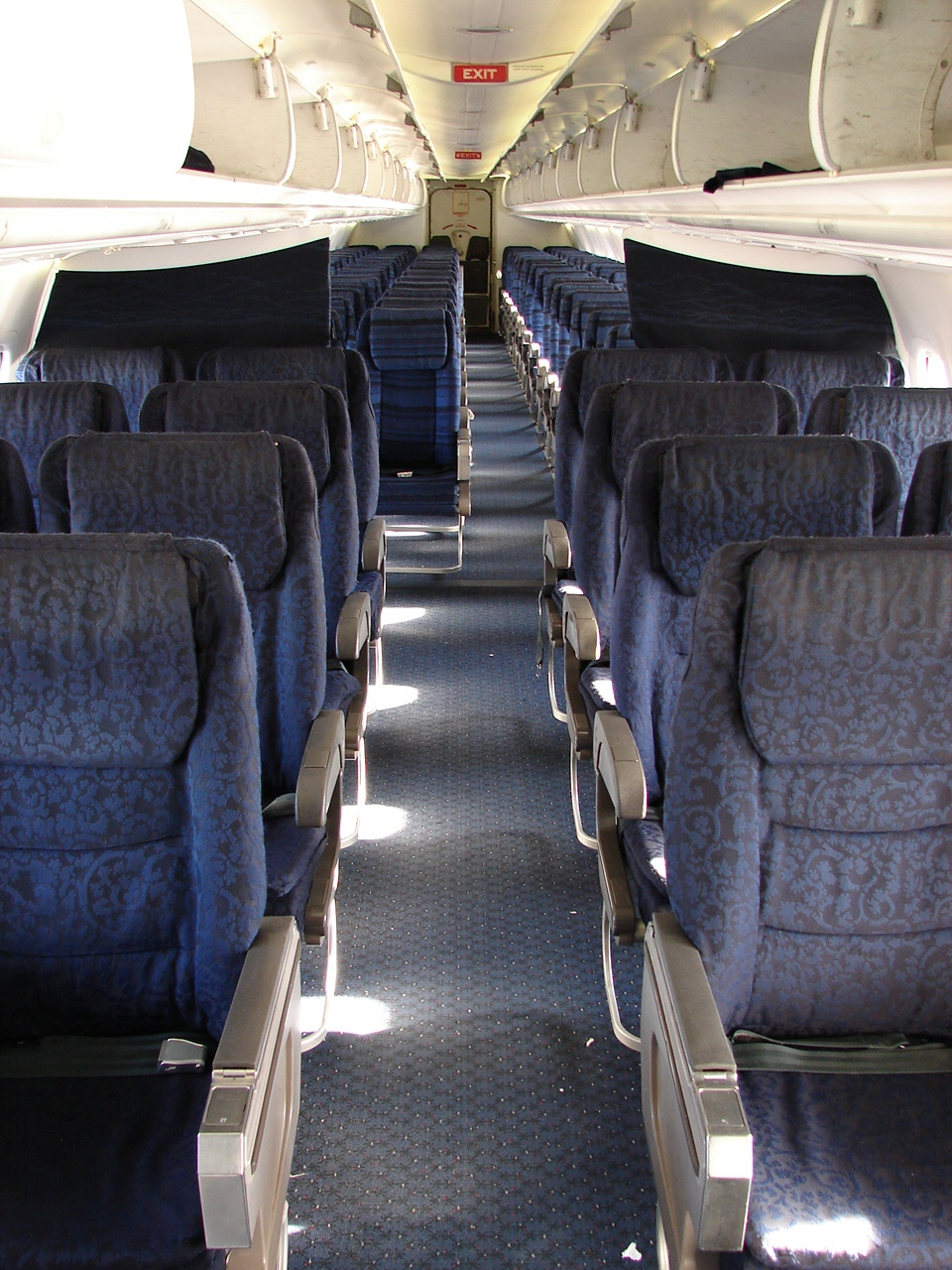
The cabin of a former Northwest Airlines DC-9, showing a typical four-abreast seating in First Class and Five-abreast seating in economy class behind.

The DC-9 was designed for short to medium-haul routes, often to smaller airports with shorter runways and less ground infrastructure than the major airports being served by larger airliners like the Boeing 707 and Douglas DC-8, where accessibility and short-field characteristics were needed. The DC-9's takeoff weight was limited to 80,000 lb (36,300 kg) for a two-person flight crew by the then-Federal Aviation Agency regulations at the time. The commercial passenger aircraft have five abreast layout for economy seating that can accommodate 80 to 135 passengers, depending on version and seating arrangement. Turnarounds were simplified by built-in airstairs, including one in the tail, which shortened boarding and deplaning times. The DC-9 was originally designed to perform a maximum of 40,000 landings.

The DC-9 has two rear-mounted JT8D turbofan engines, relatively small, efficient wings, and a T-tail. The tail-mounted engine design facilitated a clean wing without engine pods, which had numerous advantages. First, the flaps could be longer, unimpeded by pods on the leading edge and engine-blast concerns on the trailing edge. This simplified design improved airflow at low speeds and enabled lower takeoff and approach speeds, thus lowering field length requirements and keeping wing structure light. The second advantage of the tail-mounted engines was the reduction in foreign object damage from ingested debris from runways and aprons, but with this position, the engines could ingest ice streaming off the wing roots. The third was the absence of engines in underslung pods, which permitted a reduction in fuselage ground clearance, making the airliner more accessible to baggage handlers and passengers. The cockpit of the DC-9 was largely analogue, with flight controls mainly consisting of various levers, wheels, and knobs.

The problem of deep stalling, revealed by the loss of the BAC One-Eleven prototype in 1963, was overcome through various changes, including the introduction of vortilons, small surfaces beneath the wings' leading edges used to control airflow and increase low-speed lift. The need for such features is a result of the rear-mounted engines.

== Variants ==
The DC-9 series, the first generation of the DC-9 family, includes five members or variants and ten subvariants, which are the production versions (types). Their designations use the Series (DC-9-) prefix followed by a two-digit numbering with the same first digit and the second digit being a zero for variant names and a nonzero for version/type designations. The first variant, Series 10 (DC-9-10), has four versions (Series 11, Series 12, Series 14 and Series 15); the second variant, Series 20, has one version (Series 21); the third variant, Series 30, has four versions (Series 31, Series 32, Series 33 and Series 34); the fourth variant, Series 40, has one version (Series 41); and the fifth or final variant, Series 50, has one version (Series 51).

=== Series 10 ===
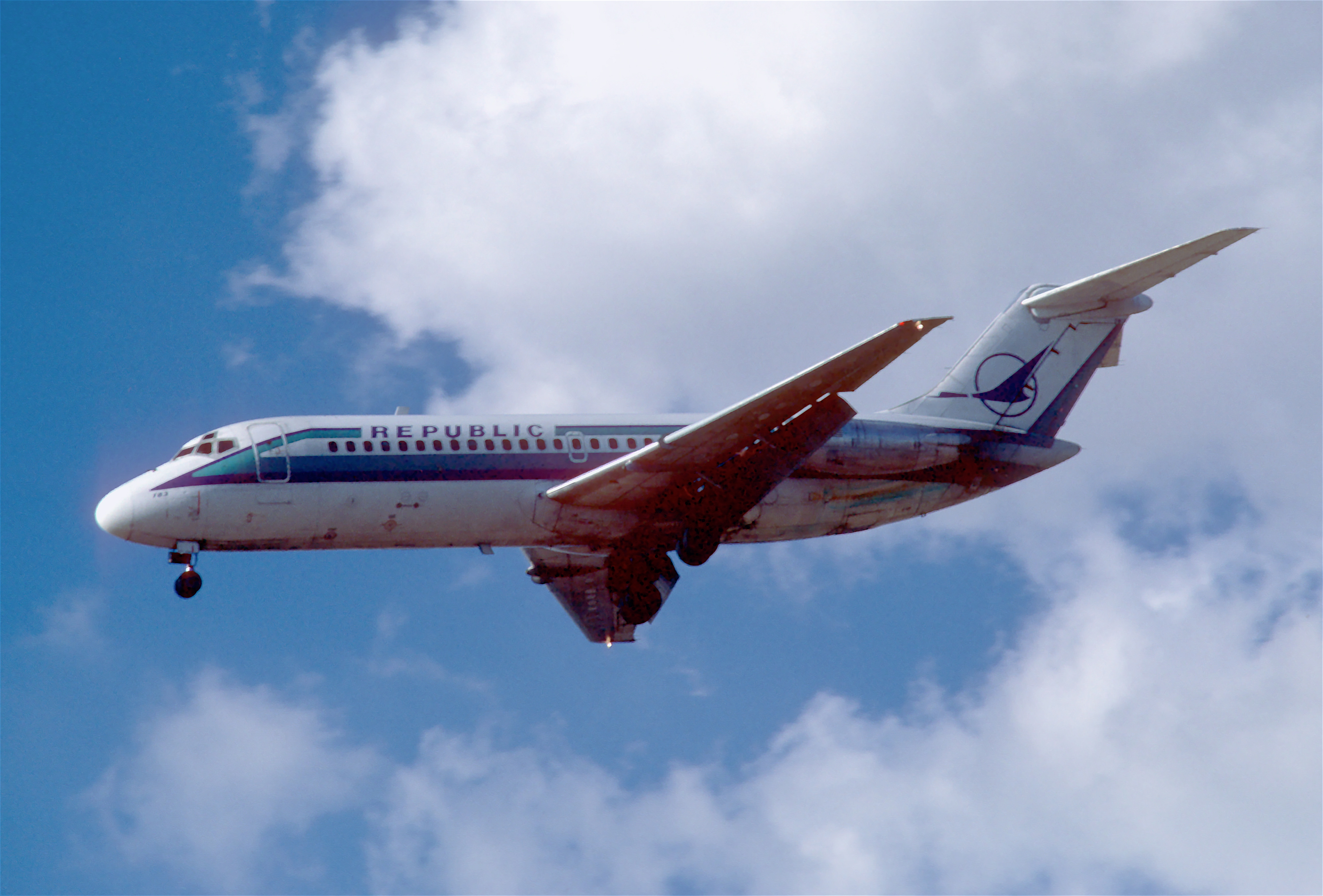
Republic Airlines DC-9-14 (1984)

Subvariant Series 11, Series 12, Series 14, Series 15

The original DC-9 (later designated the Series 10) was the smallest DC-9 variant. The -10 was 104.4 ft (31.8 m) long and had a maximum weight of 82,000 lb (37,000 kg). The Series 10 was similar in size and configuration to the BAC One-Eleven and featured a T-tail and rear-mounted engines. Power was provided by a pair of 12,500 lbf (56 kN) JT8D-5 or 14,000 lbf (62 kN) JT8D-7 engines. A total of 137 were built. Delta Air Lines was the initial operator.

The Series 10 was produced in two main subvariants, the Series 14 and 15, although, of the first four aircraft, three were built as Series 11s and one as Series 12. These were later converted to Series 14 standard. No Series 13 was produced. A combi version of the aircraft, with a 136-by-81-inch (3.5 by 2.1 m) side cargo door forward of the wing and a reinforced cabin floor, was certificated on March 1, 1967. Combi versions included the Series 15MC (minimum change) with folding seats that can be carried in the rear of the aircraft, and the Series 15RC (rapid change) with seats removable on pallets. These differences disappeared over the years as new interiors were installed.

The Series 10 was unique in the DC-9 family in not having leading-edge slats. The Series 10 was designed to have short takeoff and landing distances without the use of leading-edge high-lift devices. Therefore, the wing design of the Series 10 featured airfoils with extremely high maximum-lift capability to obtain the low stalling speeds necessary for short-field performance.

Series 10 features

The Series 10 has an overall length of 104.4 feet (31.82 m), a fuselage length of 92.1 feet (28.07 m), a passenger-cabin length of 60 feet (18.29 m), and a wingspan of 89.4 feet (27.25 m).

The Series 10 was offered with the 14,000 lbf (62 kN)-thrust JT8D-1 and JT8D-7. All versions of the DC-9 are equipped with an AlliedSignal (Garrett) GTCP85 APU, located in the aft fuselage. The Series 10, as with all later versions of the DC-9, is equipped with a two-crew analog flightdeck.

The Series 14 was originally certificated with an MTOW of 85,700 lb (38,900 kg), but subsequent options offered increases to 86,300 and 90,700 lb (41,100 kg). The aircraft's MLW in all cases is 81,700 lb (37,100 kg). The Series 14 has a fuel capacity of 3,693 US gallons (3,075 imperial gallons; 13,980 litres) (with the 907 US gal [755 imp gal; 3,430 L] centre section fuel). The Series 15, certificated on January 21, 1966, is physically identical to the Series 14 but has an increased MTOW of 90,700 lb (41,100 kg). Typical range with 50 passengers and baggage is 950 nautical miles [nmi] (1,760 km; 1,090 mi), increasing to 1,278 nmi (2,367 km; 1,471 mi) at long-range cruise. Range with maximum payload is 600 nmi (1,100 km; 690 mi), increasing to 1,450 nmi (2,690 km; 1,670 mi) with full fuel.

The aircraft is fitted with a passenger door in the port forward fuselage, and a service door/emergency exit is installed opposite. An airstair installed below the front passenger door was available as an option as was an airstair in the tailcone. This also doubled as an emergency exit. Available with either two or four overwing exits, the DC-9-10 can seat up to a maximum certified exit limit of 109 passengers. Typical all-economy layout is 90 passengers, and 72 passengers in a more typical mixed-class layout with 12 first and 60 economy-class passengers.

All versions of the DC-9 are equipped with a tricycle undercarriage, featuring a twin nose unit and twin main units.

=== Series 20 ===
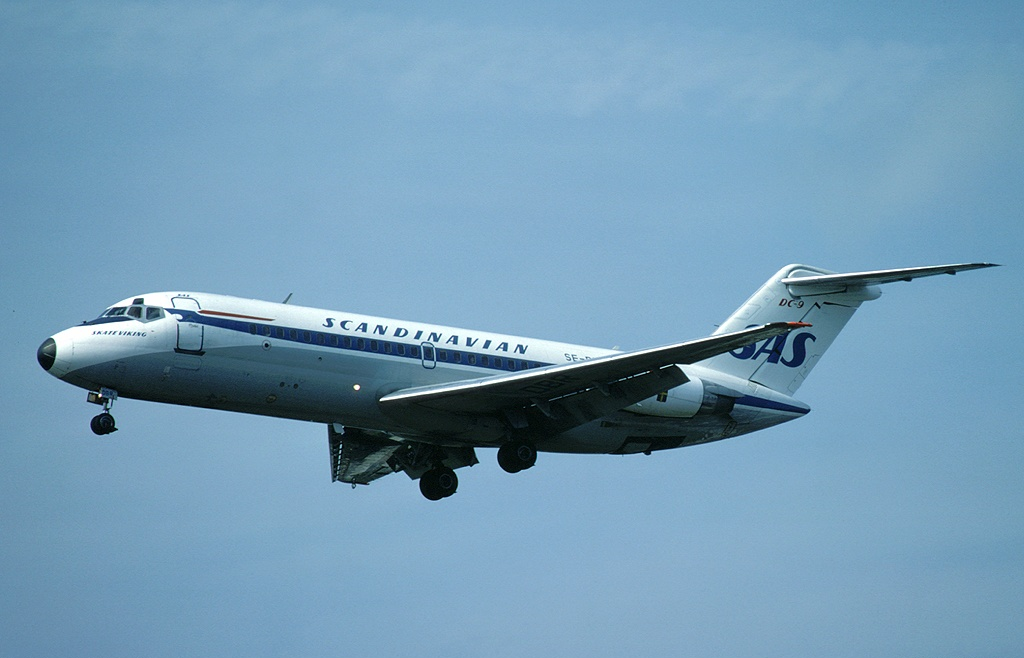
SAS DC-9-21 (1982)

Subvariant Series 21

The Series 20 was designed to satisfy a Scandinavian Airlines request for improved short-field performance by using the more-powerful engines and improved wings of the -30 combined with the shorter fuselage used in the -10. Ten Series 20 aircraft were produced, all as the Model -21. The -21 had slats and stairs at the rear of plane.

In 1969, a DC-9 Series 20 at Long Beach was fitted with an Elliott Flight Automation Head-up display by McDonnell Douglas and used for successful three-month-long trials with pilots from various airlines, the Federal Aviation Administration, and the US Air Force.

Series 20 features

The Series 20 has an overall length of 104.4 feet (31.82 m), a fuselage length of 92.1 feet (28.07 m), a passenger-cabin length of 60 feet (18.29 m), and a wingspan of 93.3 feet (28.44 m). The DC-9 Series 20 is powered by the 15,000 lbf (67 kN) thrust JT8D-11 engine.

The Series 20 was originally certificated at an MTOW of 94,500 lb (42,900 kg) but this was increased to 98,000 lb (44,000 kg), eight percent more than on the higher weight Series 14s and 15s. The aircraft's MLW is 95,300 lb (43,200 kg) and MZFW is 84,000 lb (38,000 kg). Typical range with maximum payload is 1,000 nmi (1,900 km; 1,200 mi), increasing to 1,450 nmi (2,690 km; 1,670 mi) with maximum fuel. The Series 20, using the same wing as the Series 30, 40 and 50, has a slightly lower basic fuel capacity than the Series 10 (3,679 US gallons [3,063 imp gal]).

Series 20 milestones

- First flight: September 18, 1968.
- FAA certification: November 25, 1968.
- First delivery: December 11, 1968, to Scandinavian Airlines System (SAS)
- Entry into service: January 27, 1969, with SAS.
- Last delivery: May 1, 1969, to SAS.

=== Series 30 ===
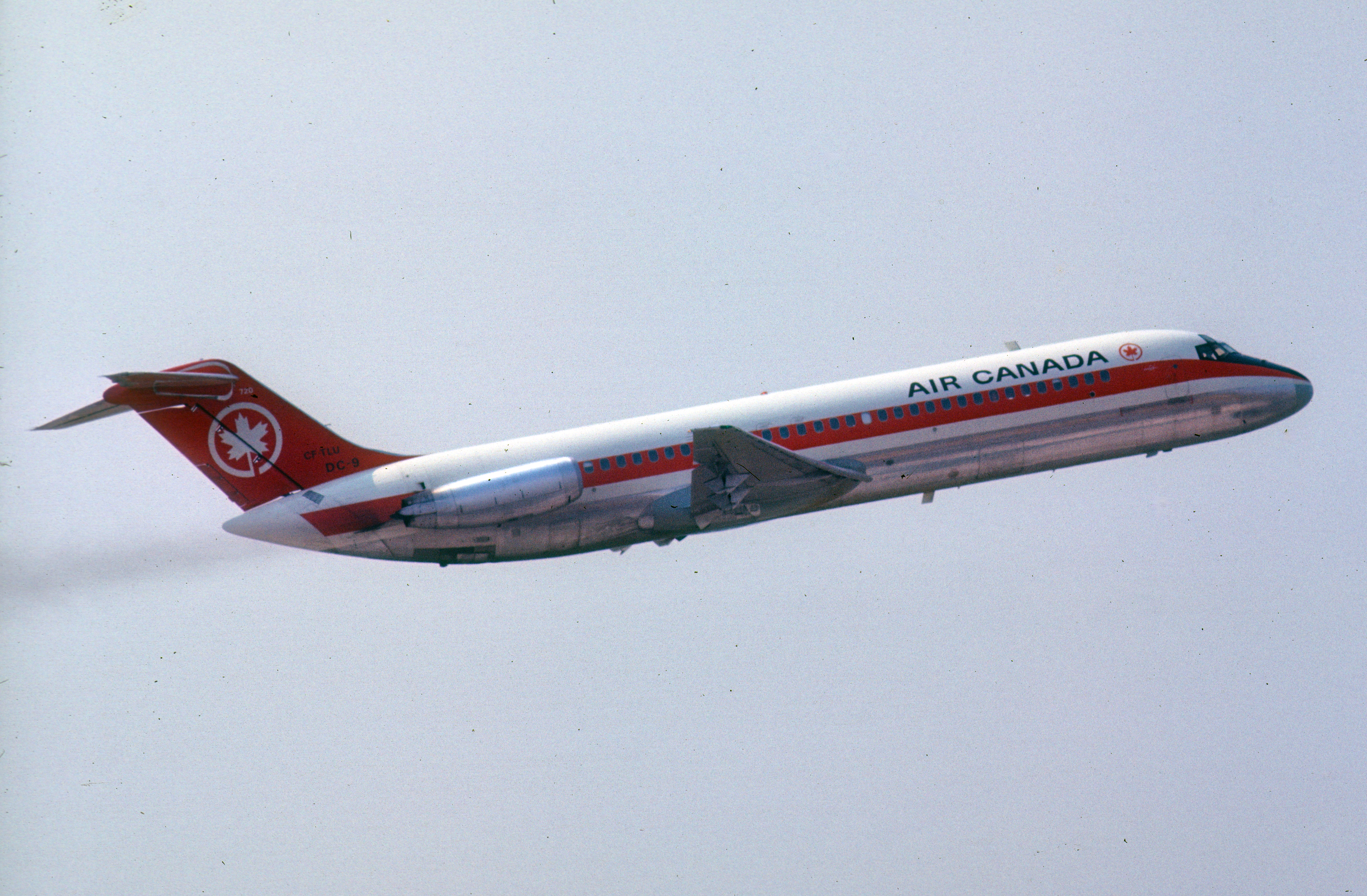
An Air Canada DC-9-32 in 1968

Subvariant Series 31, Series 32, Series 33, Series 34

The Series 30 was produced to counter Boeing's 737 twinjet; 662 were built, about 60% of the total. The -30 entered service with Eastern Airlines in February 1967 with a 14 ft 9 in (4.50 m) fuselage stretch, wingspan increased by just over 3 ft (0.9 m) and full-span leading edge slats, improving takeoff and landing performance. Maximum takeoff weight was typically 110,000 lb (50,000 kg). Engines for Models -31, -32, -33, and -34 included the P&W JT8D-7 and JT8D-9 rated at 14,500 lbf (64 kN) of thrust, or JT8D-11 with 15,000 lbf (67 kN).

Unlike the Series 10, the Series 30 had leading-edge devices to reduce the landing speeds at higher landing weights; full-span slats reduced approach speeds by six knots despite 5,000 lb greater weight. The slats were lighter than slotted Krueger flaps, since the structure associated with the slat is a more efficient torque box than the structure associated with the slotted Krueger. The wing had a six-percent increase in chord, all ahead of the front spar, allowing the 15 percent chord slat to be incorporated.

Series 30 versions

The Series 30 was built in four main sub-variants.

- DC-9-31: Produced in passenger version only. The first DC-9 Series 30 flew on August 1, 1966, and the first delivery was to Eastern Airlines on February 27, 1967, after certification on December 19, 1966. Basic MTOW of 98,000 lb (44,000 kg) and subsequently certificated at weights up to 108,000 lb (49,000 kg).
- DC-9-32: Introduced in the first year (1967). Certificated March 1, 1967. Basic MTOW of 108,000 lb (49,000 kg) later increased to 110,000 lb (50,000 kg). A number of cargo versions of the Series 32 were also produced:
  - 32LWF (Light Weight Freight) with modified cabin but no cargo door or reinforced floor, intended for package freighter use.
  - 32CF (Convertible Freighter), a combi version with a reinforced floor and removable passenger facilities
  - 32AF (All Freight), a windowless all-cargo aircraft.
- DC-9-33: Following the Series 31 and 32 came the Series 33 for combi or all-cargo use. Certificated on April 15, 1968, the aircraft's MTOW was 114,000 lb (52,000 kg), MLW to 102,000 lb (46,000 kg) and MZFW to 95,500 lb (43,300 kg). JT8D-9 or -11 (15,000 lbf (67 kN) thrust) engines were used. Wing incidence was increased 1.25 degrees to reduce cruise drag. Only 22 were built, as All Freight (AF), Convertible Freight (CF) and Rapid Change (RC) aircraft.
- DC-9-34: The last variant was the Series 34, intended for longer range with an MTOW of 121,000 lb (55,000 kg), an MLW of 110,000 lb (50,000 kg) and an MZFW of 98,000 lb (44,000 kg). The DC-9-34CF (Convertible Freighter) was certificated April 20, 1976, while the passenger followed on November 3, 1976. The aircraft has the more powerful JT8D-9s with the -15 and -17 engines as an option. It had the wing incidence change introduced on the DC-9-33. Twelve were built, five as convertible freighters.

Series 30 features

The DC-9-30 was offered with a selection of variants of JT8D including the -1, -7, -9, -11, -15. and -17. The most common on the Series 31 is the JT8D-7 (14,000 lbf (62 kN) thrust), although it was also available with the -9 and -17 engines. On the Series 32 the JT8D-9 (14,500 lbf (64 kN) thrust) was standard, with the -11 also offered. The Series 33 was offered with the JT8D-9 or -11 (15,000 lbf (67 kN) thrust) engines and the heavyweight -34 with the JT8D-9, -15 (15,000 lbf (67 kN) thrust) or -17 (16,000 lbf (71 kN) thrust) engines.

=== Series 40 ===
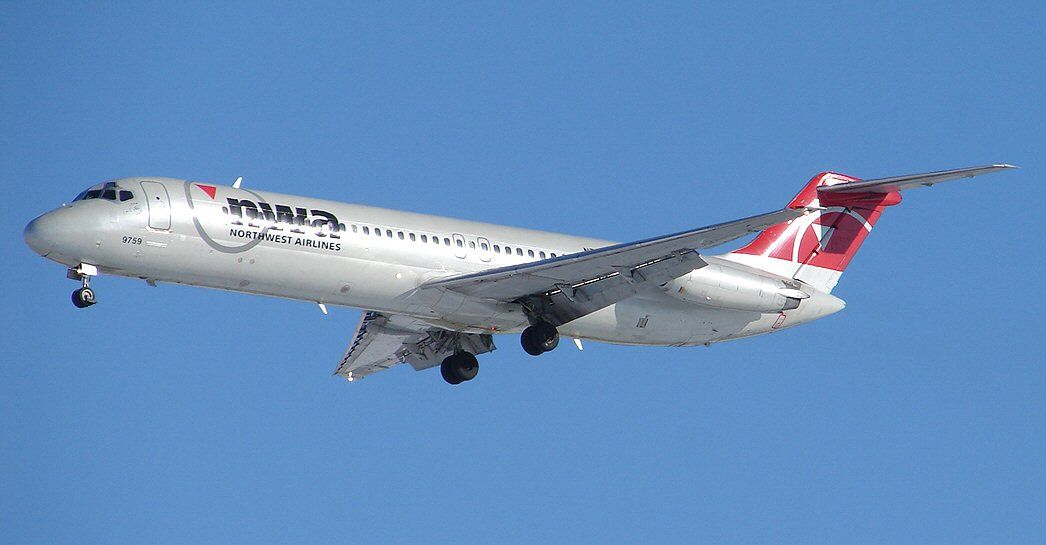
Northwest Airlines DC-9-40 (2007)

Subvariant Series 41

The DC-9-40 is a further lengthened version. With a 6 ft 6 in (2 m) longer fuselage, accommodation was up to 125 passengers. The Series 40 was fitted with Pratt & Whitney engines with thrust of 14,500 to 16,000 lbf (64 to 71 kN). A total of 71 were produced. The variant first entered service with Scandinavian Airlines System (SAS) in March 1968. Its unit cost was $5.2 million in 1972 (equivalent to $40 million in 2025).

=== Series 50 ===
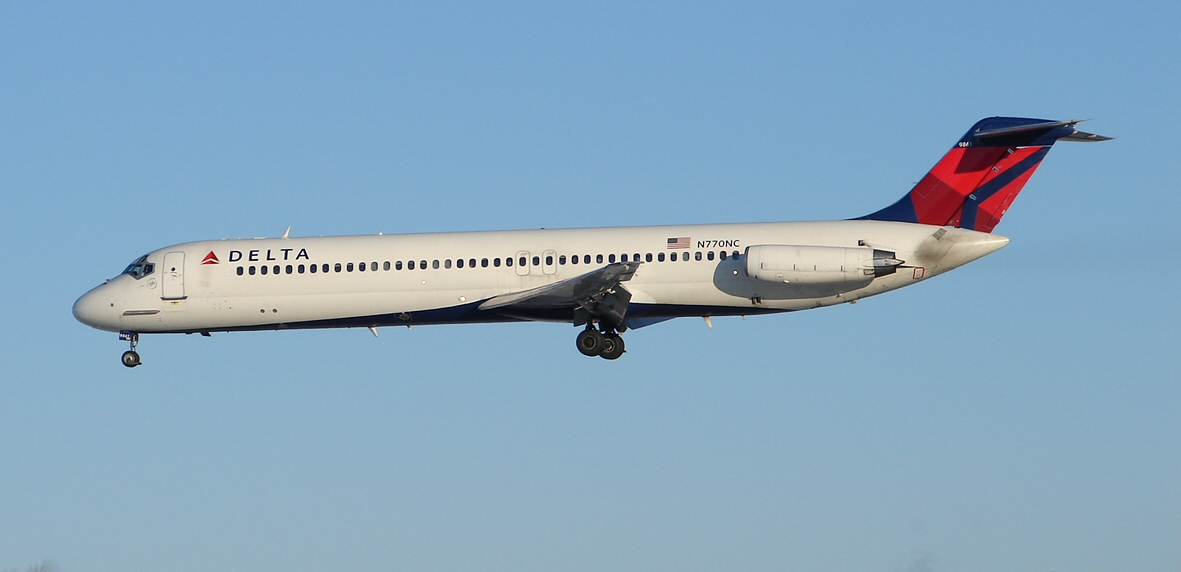
Delta Air Lines DC-9-51 (2012)

Subvariant Series 51

The Series 50 was the largest version of the DC-9 to enter airline service. It features an 8 ft 2 in (2.49 m) fuselage stretch and seats up to 139 passengers. It entered revenue service in August 1975 with Eastern Airlines and included several detail improvements, a new cabin interior, and more powerful JT8D-15 or 17 engines in the 16,000 and 16,500 lbf (71 and 73 kN) class. McDonnell Douglas delivered 96, all as the Model -51. Some visual cues to distinguish this version from other DC-9 variants include side strakes or fins below the side cockpit windows, spray deflectors on the nose gear, and thrust reversers angled inward 17 degrees compared to the original configuration. The thrust reverser modification was developed by Air Canada for its earlier aircraft, and adopted by McDonnell Douglas as a standard feature on the series 50. It was also applied to many earlier DC-9s during regular maintenance.

== Operators ==
A total of 976 DC-9s were manufactured.

As of August 2025, a total of 30 DC-9 series aircraft remain in service, of which 20 are operated by Aeronaves TSM and one passenger aircraft in service with African Express Airways, and the rest in cargo service.

With the existing DC-9 fleet shrinking, modifications do not appear to be likely to occur, especially since the wing design makes retrofitting difficult. DC-9s are therefore likely to be further replaced in service by newer airliners such as Boeing 737, Airbus A320, Embraer E-Jets, and the Airbus A220.

One former Scandinavian Airlines DC-9-21 is operated as a skydiving jump platform at Perris Valley Airport in Perris, California. With the steps on the ventral stairs removed, it is the only airline transport class jet certified by the FAA for skydiving operations as of 2006. This is the last and only -21 series still airworthy, and after being out of service for over a decade, it returned to the sky on May 7, 2024.

During the mid–1990s, Northwest Airlines was the largest operator of the type in the world, flying 180 DC-9s. After its acquisition of Northwest Airlines, Delta Air Lines operated a sizable fleet of DC-9s, most of which were over 30 years old at the time. With severe increases in fuel prices in the summer 2008, Northwest Airlines began retiring its DC-9s, switching to Airbus A319s that are 27% more fuel efficient. As the Northwest/Delta merger progressed, Delta returned several stored DC-9s to service. Delta Air Lines made its last DC-9 commercial flight from Minneapolis/St. Paul to Atlanta on January 6, 2014, with the flight number DL2014.

=== Deliveries ===
Deliveries
Type	Total	1982	1981	1980	1979	1978	1977	1976	1975	1974	1973	1972	1971	1970	1969	1968	1967	1966	1965
DC-9-10	113															10	29	69	5
DC-9-10C	24															4	20		
DC-9-20	10														9	1			
DC-9-30	585	8	10	13	24	-	1	12	16	21	21	17	42	41	97	161	101		
DC-9-30C	30					1	-	6	-	-	-	4	1	3	5	7	3		
DC-9-30F	6														4	2			
DC-9-40	71				5	6	3	2	4	27	-	3	2	7	2	10			
DC-9-50	96		5	5	10	15	18	28	15										
C-9A	21											8	1	-	5	7			
C-9B	17	2	1	-	-	-	-	2	4	-	8								
VC-9C	3								3										
DC-9 series	976	10	16	18	39	22	22	50	42	48	29	32	46	51	122	202	153	69	5

== Accidents and incidents ==
As of June 2022, the DC-9 family aircraft has been involved in 276 major aviation accidents and incidents, including 156 hull-losses, with 3,697 fatalities combined. The 1st generation DC-9 series had 107 hull-losses and 2,250 fatalities. The 2nd generation, MD-80 series had 46 hull-losses and 1,446 fatalities. The 3rd generation MD-90 series, including the Boeing 717, had 3 hull-losses and 1 fatality.

=== Accidents with fatalities ===
- On October 1, 1966, West Coast Airlines Flight 956 crashed with eighteen fatalities and no survivors. This accident marked the first loss of a DC-9.
- On March 9, 1967, TWA Flight 553 crashed in a field in Concord Township, near Urbana, Ohio, following a mid-air collision with a Beechcraft Baron, an accident that triggered substantial changes in air traffic control procedures. All 25 people on board the DC-9 and the sole occupant of the Beechcraft were killed.
- On March 27, 1968, Ozark Air Lines Flight 965, a DC-9-15, collided with a Cessna 150F while both aircraft were on approach to the same runway at Lambert Field in St. Louis, Missouri. The Cessna crashed, killing the two pilots aboard, while the DC-9 landed safely with no injuries to the 49 passengers and crew.
- On March 16, 1969, Viasa Flight 742, a DC-9-32, crashed into the La Trinidad neighborhood of Maracaibo, Venezuela, during a failed take-off. All 84 people on board the aircraft, as well as 71 people on the ground, were killed. With 155 dead in all, this was the deadliest crash involving a member of the original DC-9 family, as well as the worst crash in civil aviation history at the time it took place.
- On September 9, 1969, Allegheny Airlines Flight 853, a DC-9-30, collided in mid-air with a Piper PA-28 Cherokee near Fairland, Indiana. The DC-9 carried 78 passengers and 4 crew members, the Piper, 1 pilot. Both aircraft were destroyed, and all occupants were killed.
- On February 15, 1970, a Dominicana de Aviación DC-9-32 crashed after taking off from Santo Domingo. The crash, possibly caused by contaminated fuel, killed all 102 passengers and crew, including champion boxer Teo Cruz.
- On May 2, 1970, an Overseas National Airways DC-9-33 leased to ALM Antillean Airlines and operating as ALM Flight 980 diverted to Saint Croix, US Virgin Islands, after three landing attempts in poor weather at Princess Juliana International Airport on Saint Maarten. The aircraft ran out of fuel 30 mi (48 km) short of St. Croix, ditched in the Caribbean Sea, sank in deep water after about ten minutes, and was never recovered. 40 people survived the ditching; 23 perished.
- On November 14, 1970, Southern Airways Flight 932, a DC-9, crashed into a hill near Tri-State Airport in Huntington, West Virginia. All 75 on board were killed (including 37 members of the Marshall University Thundering Herd football team, eight members of the coaching staff, 25 boosters, and others).
- On January 21, 1972, a Turkish Airlines DC-9-32 TC-JAC diverted to Adana, Turkey after pressurization problems. The aircraft hit the ground during downwind on the 2nd approach and caught fire. There was one fatality, and four survivors.
- On January 26, 1972, JAT Flight 367 from Stockholm to Belgrade, a DC-9-32, was destroyed in flight by a bomb placed on board. The sole survivor was a flight attendant, Vesna Vulović, who holds the record for the world's longest fall without a parachute when she fell some 33,000 ft (10,000 m) inside a section of the airplane and survived.
- On March 19, 1972, EgyptAir Flight 763, a DC-9-32, crashed into the Shamsam Mountains on an approach. All 30 passengers and crew members were killed.
- On May 30, 1972, Delta Air Lines Flight 9570, a DC-9-14, crashed due to wake turbulence while attempting to land at Greater Southwest International Airport in Fort Worth behind a McDonnell Douglas DC-10. All 4 occupants aboard the DC-9 were killed. The accident prompted a pioneering FAA study into wake turbulence which resulted in the introduction of aircraft separation standards to mitigate its dangers.
- On December 20, 1972, North Central Airlines Flight 575, a DC-9-31, collided during its takeoff roll with Delta Air Lines Flight 954, a Convair CV-880 N8807E that was taxiing across the same runway at O'Hare International Airport in Chicago. The DC-9 was destroyed, killing 10 and injuring 15 of the 45 people on board; 2 people among the 93 aboard the Convair 880 suffered minor injuries. Both aircraft were written off.
- On 5 March 1973, Iberia Flight 504, a DC-9-32, flying from Palma de Mallorca Airport to Heathrow Airport when it collided in mid-air with Spantax Flight 400, a Convair 990. All 68 people on board the DC-9 were killed. The CV-990 landed safely at Cognac – Châteaubernard Air Base.
- On June 20, 1973, Aeroméxico Flight 229, a DC-9-15, crashed into the side of a mountain on approach to Licenciado Gustavo Díaz Ordaz International Airport near Puerto Vallarta. All 27 passengers and crew members killed.
- On July 31, 1973, Delta Air Lines Flight 723, a DC-9-31, crashed into a seawall at Logan International Airport in Boston, killing all 83 passengers and 6 crew members on board, including one passenger who initially survived but died months later.
- On September 11, 1974, Eastern Air Lines Flight 212, a DC-9-30, crashed just short of the runway at Charlotte Douglas International Airport, killing 72 out of the 82 occupants.
- On December 22, 1974, Avensa Flight 358, a DC-9-14, crashed after takeoff from Maturín Airport. All 75 passengers and crew members died.
- On October 30, 1975, Inex-Adria Aviopromet Flight 450, a DC-9-32, hit high ground in Prague while on approach to Prague Ruzyně Airport. 75 of the 120 people aboard were killed.
- On September 10, 1976, Inex-Adria Aviopromet Flight 550, a DC-9-31, collided with British Airways Flight 476, a Hawker Siddeley Trident 3B, over the Croatian town of Vrbovec, killing all 176 people aboard both aircraft.
- On April 4, 1977, Southern Airways Flight 242, a DC-9-31, lost engine power while flying through a severe thunderstorm. During an attempted forced landing on a highway in New Hope, Georgia, the jet struck roadside buildings, killing both pilots, 61 passengers, and 9 people on the ground. Both flight attendants and 20 passengers survived.
- On June 26, 1978, Air Canada Flight 189, a DC-9-32, overran the runway at Toronto Pearson International Airport during a rejected takeoff prompted by a blown tire. 2 of the 107 passengers and crew were killed.
- On December 23, 1978, Alitalia Flight 4128 crashed in Tyrrhenian Sea which on approach to Rome Fiumicino Airport, killed 108 of 129 passengers and crew members on board.
- On September 14, 1979, Aero Trasporti Italiani Flight 12, a DC-9-32 crashed in the mountains near Cagliari, Italy, while approaching Cagliari-Elmas Airport. All 27 passengers and 4 crew members died in the crash and ensuing fire.

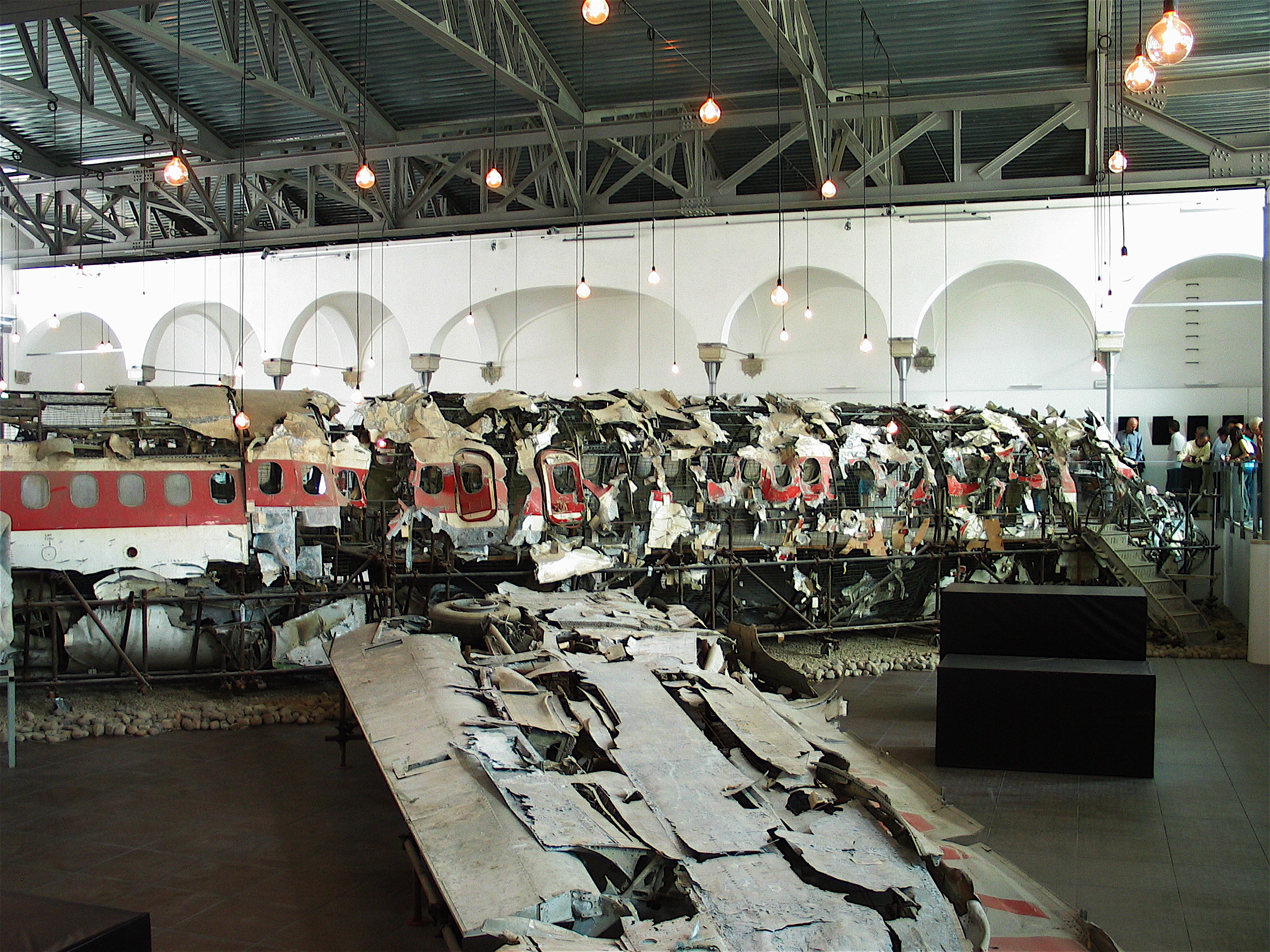
Itavia DC-9 (I-TIGI) was destroyed in an accident at Ustica. Shown in the "Museo della Memoria" opened in Bologna in 2007.

- On June 27, 1980, Itavia Flight 870, DC-9-15 I-TIGI, broke up mid-air after an explosion and crashed into the sea near the Italian island of Ustica, killing all 81 people on board. The event spawned numerous conspiracy theories, inconclusive investigations into an alleged cover-up by the Italian military, and one of the longest court inquiries in Italian history, which resulted in a 2013 ruling that the DC-9 was shot down by an air-to-air missile launched by a warplane, but without identifying who fired the missile or why. A popular theory endorsed by Giuliano Amato and Francesco Cossiga, both former Prime Ministers of Italy, says that the French Air Force shot down the DC-9 while trying to down a different aircraft carrying Libyan leader Muammar Gaddafi, but no conclusive evidence of this has been presented.
- On July 27, 1981, Aeroméxico Flight 230, a DC-9-32 ran off the runway at Chihuahua International Airport. Thirty passengers and two crew of the sixty-six on board were killed. Bad weather and pilot error were the causes of the accident.
- On November 8, 1981, Aeroméxico Flight 110, a DC-9-32, crashed near Zihuatanejo during emergency descent to Acapulco International Airport after a cabin decompression, killing all 18 passengers and crew members.
- On March 11, 1983, Avensa Flight 007, a DC-9-32, landed hard at Barquisimeto Airport, skidded off the runway and exploded, killing 23 of the 50 passengers and crew members.
- On June 2, 1983, Air Canada Flight 797, a DC-9-32, experienced an electrical fire in the aft lavatory during flight, resulting in an emergency landing at Cincinnati/Northern Kentucky International Airport. During evacuation, the sudden influx of oxygen caused a flash fire throughout the cabin, resulting in the deaths of 23 of the 41 passengers, including Canadian folk singer Stan Rogers. All five crew members survived.
- On December 7, 1983, in the Madrid runway disaster, a departing Iberia Boeing 727 struck an Aviaco DC-9, causing the death of 93 passengers and crew. All 42 passengers and crew on board the DC-9 were killed.
- On December 20, 1983, Ork Air Lines Flight 650, a DC-9-31, struck a snowplow on landing at Sioux Falls Regional Airport in low visibility. The right wing was torn from the jet; the snowplow driver was killed and two flight attendants were injured. The accident was attributed to inadequate air traffic control (ATC) supervision of snow-clearing operations.
- On September 6, 1985, Midwest Express Airlines Flight 105, operated with a DC-9-14, crashed just after takeoff from General Mitchell International Airport in Milwaukee. The crash was caused by improper control inputs by the flight crew after the number 2 engine failed, and all 31 aboard were killed.
- On August 31, 1986, Aeroméxico Flight 498 collided in mid-air with a Piper Cherokee over the city of Cerritos, California, then crashed into the city, killing all 64 aboard the aircraft, 15 people on the ground, and all 3 in the Piper plane.
- On April 4, 1987, Garuda Indonesia Flight 035, a DC-9-32, hit a pylon and crashed on approach to Polonia International Airport in bad weather with 24 fatalities.
- On November 15, 1987, Continental Airlines Flight 1713, a DC-9-14, crashed on takeoff from Stapleton International Airport in bad weather with 28 fatalities. This accident was attributed to a combination of ATC confusion, exceeding the allowed time limit for takeoff after de-icing the wings, and inexperienced crew.
- On March 18, 1989, the main external cargo door of Evergreen International Airlines Flight 17, a DC-9-33F freighter, opened shortly after takeoff from Carswell Air Force Base. The airliner crashed in Saginaw, Texas, while attempting to return to Carswell, killing the two pilots. The accident was attributed to a loss of aircraft control. Contributing factors included an electrical design flaw that caused the cockpit warning light to indicate that the door was latched properly when it was not; the flaw had been fixed in later-production DC-9s, and investigators faulted the FAA for not mandating the installation of the improved circuit in all affected aircraft after similar incidents.
- On November 14, 1990, Alitalia Flight 404, a DC-9-32, crashed into a mountain on approach to Zurich Airport at night, killing all 46 people on board. The crash was attributed to an instrument landing system receiver malfunction that caused incorrect altitude indications, the fact that the mountain was not lighted, and poor judgment by the pilots, particularly the captain's decision to disregard the first officer's concerns about incongruous altitude readings and continue the approach.
- On December 3, 1990, the pilots of Northwest Airlines Flight 1482, a DC-9-14, became disoriented in fog at Detroit-Metropolitan Wayne County Airport, Michigan, and entered the active runway instead of the taxiway instructed by ATC; the jet was then struck by a departing Boeing 727, killing 8.
- On February 17, 1991, Ryan International Airlines Flight 590, a DC-9-15RC operating a mail flight, crashed on takeoff from Cleveland Hopkins International Airport, killing both pilots. The accident was attributed to the pilots' failure to properly deice the aircraft, and to "a lack of appropriate response" by the FAA, Douglas, and the airline to "the known critical effect that a minute amount of ice contamination has on the stall characteristics of the DC-9 series 10 airplane."
- On March 5, 1991, Aeropostal Alas de Venezuela Flight 108, a DC-9-32, crashed into a mountainside in Trujillo, Venezuela, killing all 40 passengers and 5 crew aboard.
- On July 2, 1994, USAir Flight 1016, a DC-9-31, crashed near Charlotte Douglas International Airport while performing a go-around prompted by heavy storms and wind shear, killing 37 and injuring 15 aboard. Although the airplane crashed in a residential area with the tail section striking a house, there were no fatalities or injuries on the ground.
- On January 11, 1995, Intercontinental de Aviación Flight 256, a DC-9-14, crashed in María La Baja, Colombia, on approach to Rafael Núñez International Airport, killing 51 of 52 passengers and crew members.
- On May 11, 1996, ValuJet Flight 592, DC-9-32 N904VJ crashed in the Florida Everglades due to a fire caused by the activation of chemical oxygen generators illegally stored in the hold. The fire damaged the plane's electrical system and eventually overcame the crew, resulting in the deaths of all 110 people on board.
- On October 10, 1997, Austral Flight 2553, a DC-9-32, crashed near Fray Bentos, Uruguay, killing all 69 passengers and 5 crew on board.
- On February 2, 1998, Cebu Pacific Flight 387, a DC-9-32, crashed on the slopes of Mount Sumagaya in Misamis Oriental, Philippines, killing all 104 passengers and crew on board. Investigators deemed the incident to be caused by pilot error when the plane made a non-regular stopover to Tacloban.
- On November 9, 1999, TAESA Flight 725 crashed a few minutes after leaving Uruapan International Airport en route to Mexico City. 18 people were killed in the accident.
- On October 6, 2000, Aeroméxico Flight 250, DC-9-31 N936ML, overran the runway at General Lucio Blanco International Airport in Reynosa, crashed into houses, and fell into a canal; 4 on the ground were killed, but all 83 passengers and 5 crew survived. The accident was attributed to a late and excessively fast touchdown on a runway that was waterlogged due to heavy rainfall from Hurricane Keith.
- On 10 December 2005, Sosoliso Airlines Flight 1145 crash-landed at Port Harcourt International Airport, Nigeria. There were 108 fatalities and 2 survivors.
- On April 15, 2008, Hewa Bora Airways Flight 122 crashed into a residential neighborhood, in the Goma, Democratic Republic of the Congo, resulting in the deaths of at least 44 people.
- On July 6, 2008, USA Jet Airlines Flight 199, a DC-9-15F, crashed on approach to Saltillo, Mexico, after a flight from Shreveport, Louisiana. The captain died and the first officer was seriously injured.

=== Hull losses ===
- On December 27, 1968, Ozark Air Lines Flight 982, a DC-9-15, crashed during takeoff at Sioux Gateway Airport. All 68 passengers and crew members survived, but 35 were injured. The accident was attributed to the pilots' failure to deice the wings and their selection of an improper takeoff thrust setting.
- On November 27, 1973, Eastern Airlines Flight 300, a DC-9-31, landed long at Akron-Canton Airport in light rain and fog, overran the runway, and went over an embankment. All 21 passengers and 5 crew survived with various injuries.
- On February 21, 1986, USAir Flight 499, a DC-9-31, landed long and overran the runway in snow at Erie International Airport. One passenger suffered minor injuries and the other 17 passengers and 5 crew were uninjured. The accident was attributed to poor judgment by the pilots; bad weather was a contributing factor.
- On March 30, 1992, Aviaco Flight 231, a DC-9-32, landed hard at Granada Airport and split into half. No one died of the 99 on board.
- On April 18, 1993, Japan Air System Flight 451, a DC-9-41, skidded off the runway at Hanamaki Airport after the inexperienced pilot mishandled a go-around attempt due to windshear and landed hard. There were 19 injuries in the crash and ensuing fire, but all 77 aboard survived.
- On March 21, 1994, Aviaco Flight 260, a DC-9-32, undershot the runway at Vigo-Peinador Airport in a foggy approach, injuring 62 of the 116 on board.

=== Other incidents ===
- On March 17, 1970, a DC-9-31 was operating Eastern Air Lines Shuttle Flight 1320, a scheduled flight from Newark International Airport to Logan International Airport, when passenger John Divivo produced a revolver and demanded to see the pilots. Divivo then shot both pilots before the first officer wrestled away the gun and shot him. The captain landed the aircraft safely at Logan despite bullet wounds to both arms, the first officer was pronounced dead, and Divivo was arrested and hospitalized. This was the first US aircraft hijacking to result in a fatality.

== Aircraft on display ==
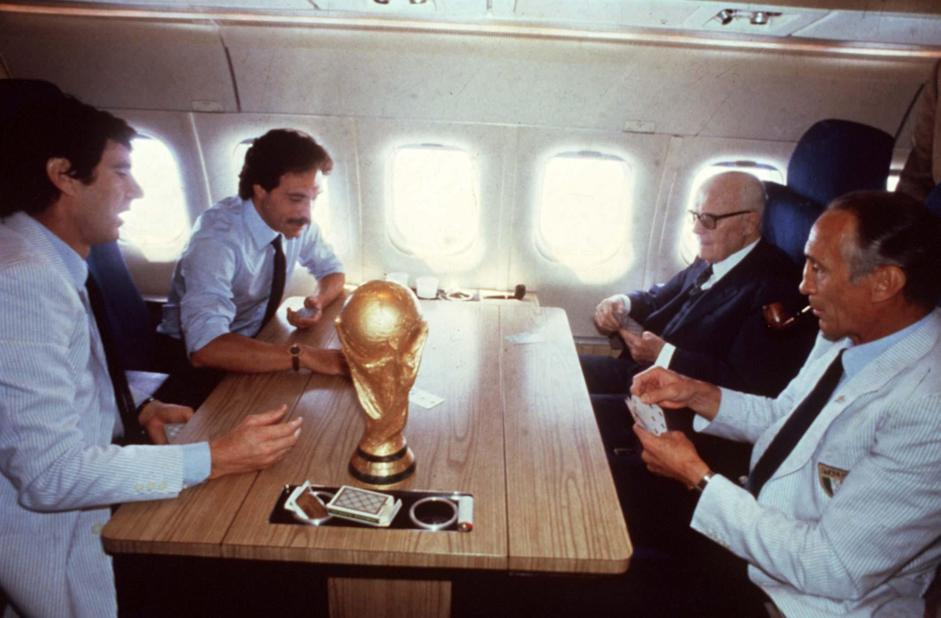
President of Italy Sandro Pertini with Italy's football team on board DC-9-32 MM62012 after winning the 1982 World Cup. This aircraft is now preserved at Milan Malpensa Airport.

=== Canada ===
- CF-TLL (cn 47021) – DC-9-32 on static display at the Canada Aviation and Space Museum in Ottawa, Ontario, Canada.

=== Czechia ===
- N1332U (cn 47404) – DC-9-31 nose section preserved at industrial area in Liberec, Czechia and rebuilt into flight simulator. The DC-9 was previously operated by Northwest.

=== Indonesia ===
- PK-GNC (cn 47481) – DC-9-32 painted in Garuda Indonesia's 1960s livery and put on display inside GMF hangar in Soekarno-Hatta Airport.
- PK-GNT (cn 47790) – DC-9-32 on static display at the Transportation Museum in Taman Mini Indonesia Indah in Jakarta, Indonesia. It was relegated to display status after suffering heavy damage in a landing accident in 1993. It was previously operated by Garuda Indonesia.

=== Italy ===
- MM62012 (cn 47595) – DC-9-32 on static display at Volandia adjacent to Milan Malpensa Airport. This aircraft was operated by the Italian Air Force as a VIP transport, carrying the president of Italy among other duties.

=== Netherlands ===
- N929L (cn 47174) – DC-9-32 nose section displayed inside Schiphol International Airport. Painted in KLM livery although the plane never served with the airline. It was previously used by TWA and Delta Air Lines.

=== Mexico ===
- XA-JEB – Ex Aeromexico DC-9-32 on display at a park in Cadereyta de Montes, Querétaro, Mexico. Formerly Hugh Hefner's private jet, the 'Big Bunny', XA-JEB was sold in 1976 to Venezuela Airlines, who later sold it to Aeromexico, where it was operated until 2004. It was sold and placed on display in 2008 for use as an educational tool.
- N942ML – with painted registration "XA-SFE" is found on the second floor of the Luxury shopping mall "Centro Comercial Santa Fe" in the business district of Mexico City. It is on display with an Interjet livery for the Kidzania brand.
- XA-SKA – preserved intact at Hank González Bicentennial Park in Ecatepec, Mexico. Originally operated by Avensa and Viasa, and last flown by Aerocaribe, the retired airframe was relocated in 2012 and converted into a public community library.
- N606NW – with painted registration "XA-MEX" can be found in Cuicuilo Plaza at the south of the city. Similar to "XA-SFE", it wears an Interjet Livery for the Kidzania brand.

=== Spain ===
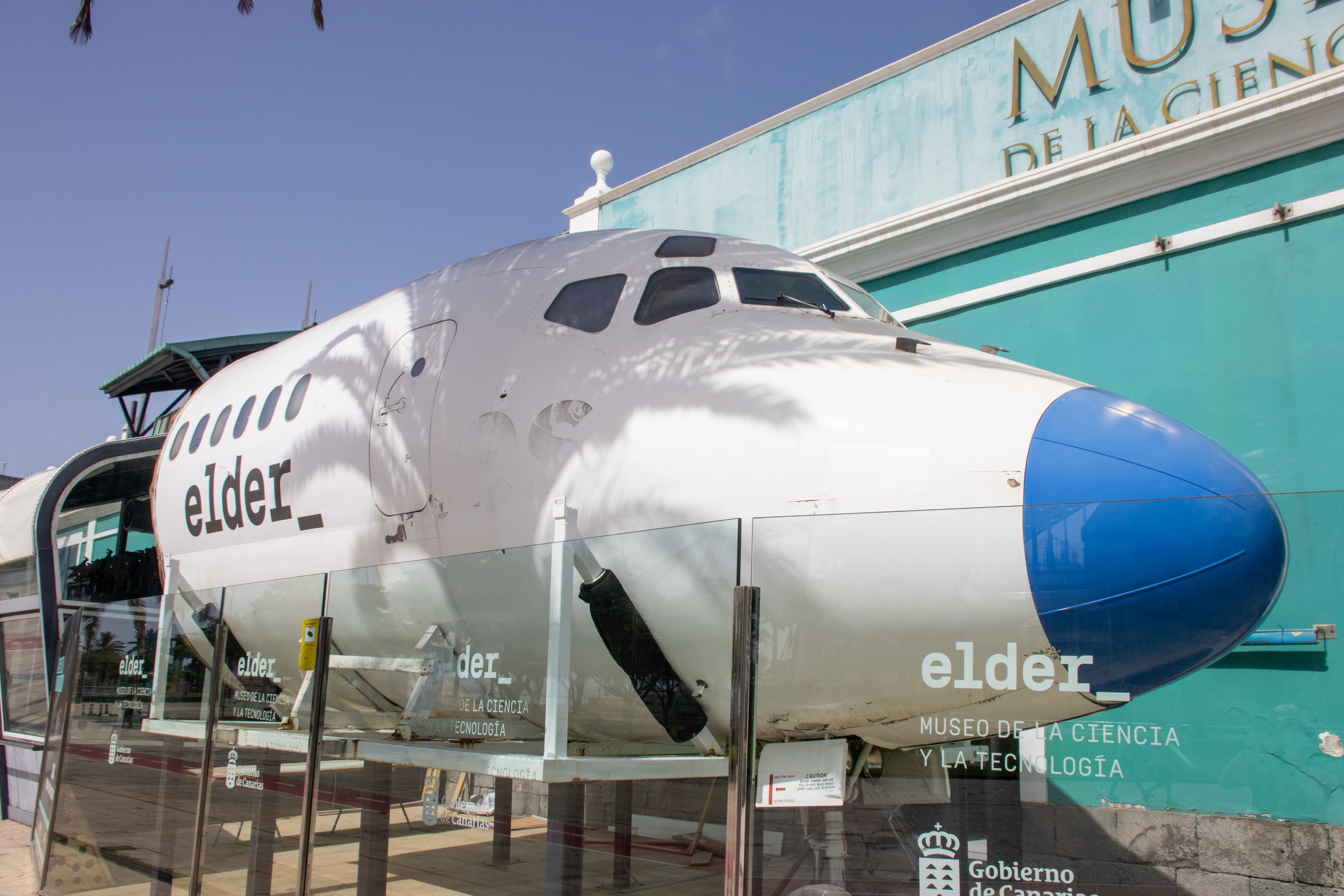
Preserved front section at Elder Museum, Canary Islands

- EC-BYE (cn 47504) – DC-9-32 forward fuselage section only preserved at the Museo del Aire in Madrid.
- EC-BQZ (cn 47456) – DC-9-32 on static display at Adolfo Suárez Madrid–Barajas Airport in Madrid.
- EC-DGB – DC-9-34 front section only preserved at Elder Museum of Science and Technology, Gran Canaria.

=== United States ===
- N79XS – DC-9-41 (S/N 47779) is preserved as a 60-foot forward fuselage/nose section at Sport Flyers Airport (27XS) in Brookshire, Texas. Formerly used as a theme park attraction, it is currently being renovated into a private cinema alongside MD-81 (N813ME).
- N675MC (cn 47651) – DC-9-51 on static display at the Delta Flight Museum at Hartsfield–Jackson Atlanta International Airport in Atlanta, Georgia. It arrived at the museum on 27 April 2014. It was previously operated by Delta Air Lines.
- N782NC (cn 48107) – DC-9-51 on static display at Thief River Falls Regional Airport near Thief River Falls, Minnesota. It and N779NC were both flown from Atlanta to their final homes on January 23, 2014 after Delta Air Lines ceased DC-9 passenger operations with a flight from Minneapolis–Saint Paul International Airport to Atlanta on January 6, 2014.
- N803AT (cn 47261) – DC-9-32 on static display at the Virginia Air and Space Science Center in Hampton, Virginia. Located in the Adventures in Flight gallery, the aircraft contains a flight simulator and allows guests to view the inside of the cockpit. It was previously operated by AirTran Airways, who donated it to the museum.

== Specifications ==
DC-9 airplane characteristics
Variant	-15	-21	-32	-41	-51
Cockpit crew	2				
1-class seating	90Y @ 31 to 32 in (79 to 81 cm)		115Y @ 31 to 33 in (79 to 84 cm)	125 @ 31 to 34 in (79 to 86 cm)	135 @ 32 to 33 in (81 to 84 cm)
Exit limit	109		127	128	139
Cargo	600 ft^{3} (17 m^{3}) (Note: -15F – cargo: 2,762 ft^{3} (78.2 m^{3}), empty: 53,200 lb (24,100 kg))		895 ft^{3} (25.3 m^{3}) (Note: -33F – cargo: 4,195 ft^{3} (118.8 m^{3}), empty: 56,430 lb (25,600 kg))	1,019 ft^{3} (28.9 m^{3})	1,174 ft^{3} (33.2 m^{3})
Length	104 ft 4.8 in (31.821 m)		119 ft 3.6 in (36.363 m)	125 ft 7.2 in (38.283 m)	133 ft 7 in (40.72 m)
Wingspan	89 ft 4.8 in (27.249 m)	93 ft 3.6 in (28.438 m)			93 ft 4.2 in (28.453 m)
Height	27 ft 7 in (8.41 m)		27 ft 9 in (8.46 m)	28 ft 5 in (8.66 m)	28 ft 9 in (8.76 m)
Width	131.6 in (334 cm) fuselage, 122.4 in (311 cm) cabin				
Max. takeoff wt.	90,700 lb (41,100 kg)	98,000 lb (44,000 kg)	108,000 lb (49,000 kg)	114,000 lb (52,000 kg)	121,000 lb (55,000 kg)
Empty	49,162 lb (22,300 kg)	52,644 lb (23,879 kg)	56,855 lb (25,789 kg)	61,335 lb (27,821 kg)	64,675 lb (29,336 kg)
Fuel	24,743 lb (11,223 kg)		24,649 lb (11,181 kg)		
Engine (2×)	JT8D-1/5/7/9/11/15/17	-9/11	-1/5/7/9/11/15/17	-9/11/15/17	-15/17
Thrust (2×)	-1/7: 14,000 lbf (62 kN), -5/-9: 12,250 lbf (54.5 kN), -11: 15,000 lbf (67 kN), -15: 15,500 lbf (69 kN), -17: 16,000 lbf (71 kN)				
Ceiling	35,000 ft (11,000 m)				
MMo	Mach 0.84 (484 kn; 897 km/h; 557 mph)				
Range	1,300 nmi (2,400 km; 1,500 mi)	1,500 nmi (2,800 km; 1,700 mi)	1,500 nmi (2,800 km; 1,700 mi)	1,200 nmi (2,200 km; 1,400 mi)	1,300 nmi (2,400 km; 1,500 mi)

== See also ==
- 2006 Mexico DC-9 drug bust
- Airstair

Related development

- Boeing 717
- Comac C909
- McDonnell Douglas C-9
- McDonnell Douglas MD-80
- McDonnell Douglas MD-90

Aircraft of comparable role, configuration, and era

- BAC One-Eleven
- Boeing 737
- Dassault Mercure
- Fokker F28 Fellowship
- Hawker Siddeley Trident
- Sud Aviation Caravelle
- Tupolev Tu-134

Related lists

- List of civil aircraft
- List of jet airliners

== Bibliography ==
- Anderton, David A. (1976). Progress in Aircraft Design Since 1903. National Aeronautics and Space Administration, Langley Research Center.
- Becher, Thomas (2002). Douglas Twinjets, DC-9, MD-80, MD-90 and Boeing 717. Ramsbury, Marlborough, UK: Crowood Press. ISBN 978-1-8612-6446-6.
- Eden, Paul E. (2016). The World's Most Powerful Civilian Aircraft. Rosen Publishing. ISBN 978-1-4994-6589-1.
- Norris, Guy; Wagner, Mark (1999). Douglas Jetliners. Zenith Imprint. ISBN 978-1-61060-716-2.
- Roberson, Patricia Q. (1997). Aerospace Science: Frontiers of Aviation History. Air Force Reserve Officer Training Corps.
- "Super 80 For the Eighties". Air International. Vol. 18, no. 6. June 1980. pp. 267–272, 292–296. ISSN 0306-5634.
- Sadraey, Mohammad H. (2012). Aircraft Design: A Systems Engineering Approach. Wiley. ISBN 978-1-119-95340-1.
- Taylor, John W. R. (1966). Jane's All The World's Aircraft 1966–67. London, UK: Sampson Low, Marston & Company.
- Taylor, John W. R. (1976). Jane's All The World's Aircraft 1976–77. London, UK: Jane's Yearbooks. ISBN 0-354-00538-3.
- Vasigh, Bijan; Taleghani, Reza; Jenkins, Darryl (2012). Aircraft Finance: Strategies for Managing Capital Costs in a Turbulent Industry. J. Ross Publishing. ISBN 978-1-60427-071-6.
