= Aviaco Flight 231 =

1992 aviation accident in Spain

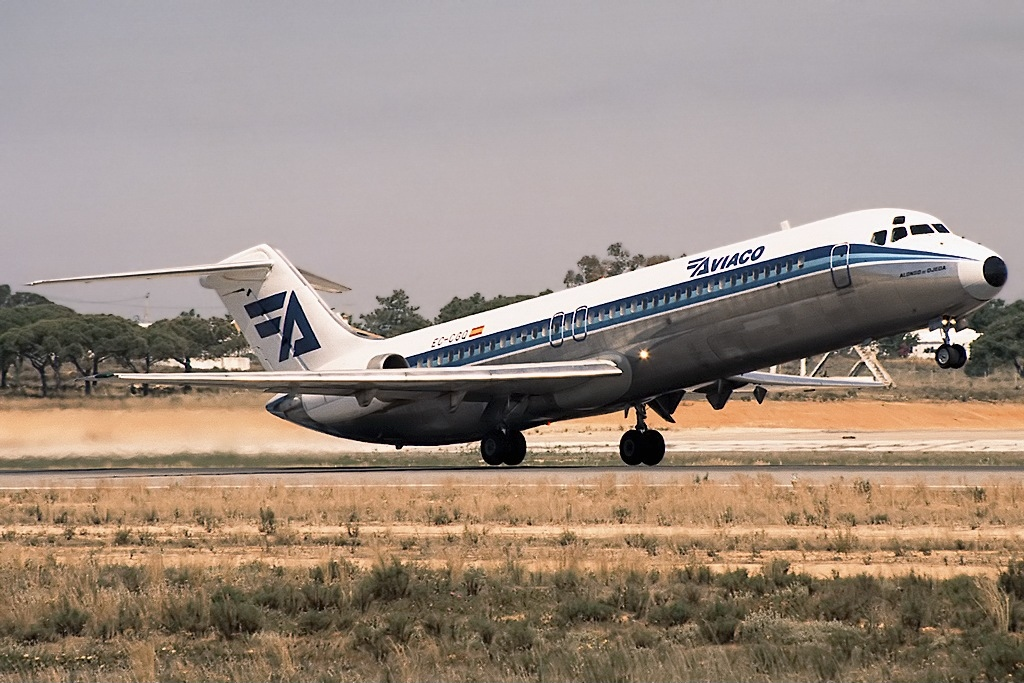
- An Aviaco DC-9 similar to the one that was involved

Occurrence
- Date: 30 March 1992
- Summary: Hard landing resulted in the fuselage separation
- Site: Granada Airport, Chauchina, Spain

Aircraft
- Aircraft type: McDonnell Douglas DC-9-32
- Aircraft name: Castillo de Butrón
- Operator: Aviaco
- IATA flight No.: AO231
- ICAO flight No.: AYC231
- Call sign: AVIACO 231
- Registration: EC-BYH
- Flight origin: Madrid–Barajas Airport, Madrid, Spain
- Destination: Granada Airport, Chauchina, Spain
- Occupants: 99
- Passengers: 94
- Crew: 5
- Fatalities: 0
- Injuries: 26
- Survivors: 99

Aviaco Flight 231 was a scheduled domestic passenger flight from Madrid-Barajas Airport to Granada Airport. On 30 March 1992, the aircraft slammed into the runway during the approach, breaking the fuselage into two parts. All 99 occupants survived the crash.

== Accident ==
On that day, during the approach to runway 09 at Granada Airport, the aircraft encountered an 11-knot tailwind and heavy rain. At 20:20, in the roll-out, the aircraft's landing gear struck the runway with a vertical force of 4.49g, causing the aircraft to burst all of its main landing gear and bounce off. The plane flew for 36 meters before falling back onto the runway with a deceleration of 4.79g.As a result of the impact, the fuselage broke incompletely into two parts. As the plane skidded down the runway, it veered to one side, tearing apart the fuselage completely, and came to rest in two pieces about 100 meters apart.

All 94 passengers and 5 crew on board survived the crash. There were 26 injuries, 14 of which were reported seriously injured.

== Cause ==
As stated in the declarations of Aviaco's director of operations, the most probable cause of the accident was the bad weather presented during landing: strong winds with windshear and rain. The bad weather possibly prevented the aircraft from having a stabilized approach and hit the ground with great force, although some media also collect testimonies from passengers who claim that the maneuvers carried out by the crew during the landing were not the usual ones.

Iberia (the airline that owned 65% of Aviaco) also opened the avenue of investigation to see if the accident had been caused by a tire blowout at the moment of contact with the runway that could have triggered the sequence of subsequent events.

Following statements from numerous witnesses, the crew requested to undergo a voluntary breathalyzer test to demonstrate their transparency, but the request was denied.

== Aircraft remains ==
The fuselage of the crashed airliner was removed from Granada Airport after the accident and abandoned in a scrapyard until it was found by sculptor Eduardo Cajal. After purchasing it, he restored it and converted it into a mobile exhibition space, which was presented at the Madrid International Contemporary Art Fair (ARCO) in 2005 under the name Proyecto Avión (Airplane Project) as a setting for a book launch. The fuselage has been adapted and is not complete; only a portion of the aircraft's cylinder or fuselage, approximately 24 meters long, remains. The wings have been removed.

After its presentation at Arco, this piece of the airplane has traveled to different parts of Spain, for example, at the Malaga Film Festival in 2007. In 2012, it went abroad, being transported by road to Wales for the 2012 Cultural Olympiad.
