= Aviaco Flight 111 =

Aircraft crash in Spain 1957

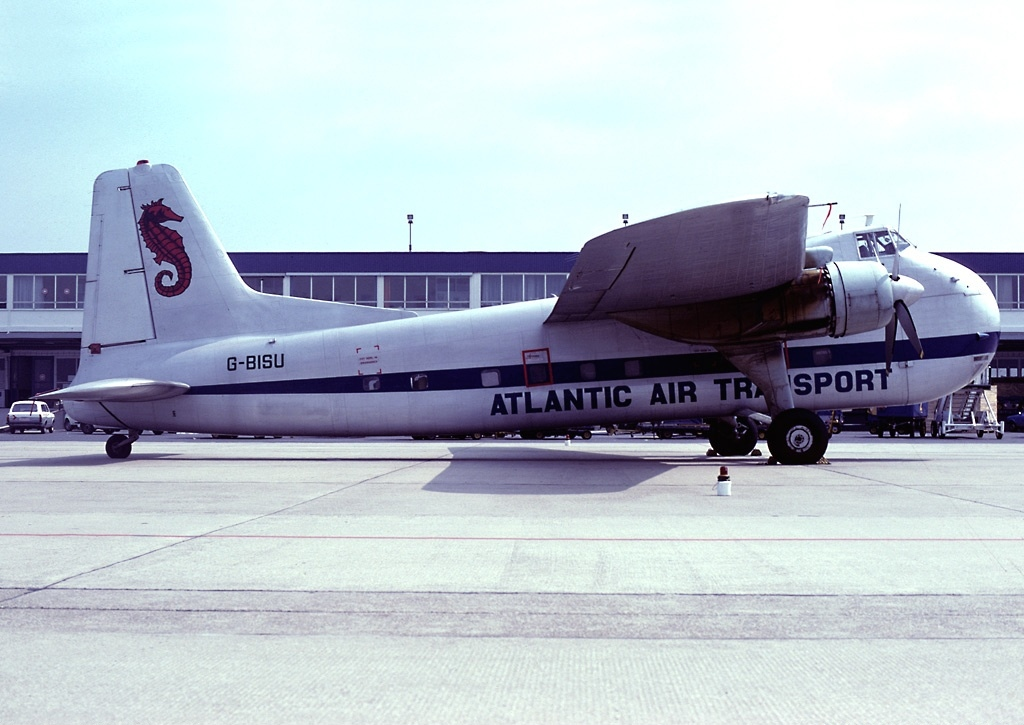
- A Bristol 170 Freighter 21, similar to the involved aircraft.

Occurrence
- Date: 9 May 1957
- Summary: Crashed after loss of control
- Site: near Madrid–Barajas Airport, Spain

Aircraft
- Aircraft type: Bristol 170 Freighter 21
- Operator: Aviaco
- Registration: EC-ADI
- Flight origin: Santiago de Compostela Airport, Spain
- Destination: Madrid-Barajas Airport, Spain
- Occupants: 37
- Passengers: 32
- Crew: 5
- Fatalities: 37
- Injuries: 0
- Survivors: 0

Aviaco Flight 111 (AO111) was a domestic scheduled flight by Aviaco from Santiago de Compostela to Madrid. On 9 May 1957 the Bristol 170 crashed shortly before landing at Madrid–Barajas Airport, killing all 37 passengers due to a loss of control.

== Background ==
=== Aircraft ===
The involved aircraft was a Bristol 170 Mk 21, manufactured in the UK in 1946. The aircraft had the serial number 12757, and was assigned the aircraft registration number EC-ADI at Aviaco.

=== Crew ===
During the accident there was a crew of five on board, consisting of the captain, first officer, flight engineer and two flight attendants. The captain had received his commercial pilot's license on 16 January 1952 and had 5,478 hours of flight experience, while the first officer had completed 427 flight hours.

== Accident ==
At 19:04 CET on 9 May 1957, Aviaco Flight 111 crashed near Madrid–Barajas Airport during its approach to land on runway 23. While flying on the downwind leg, the aircraft was banked slightly to the left to allow the captain a better view of the control tower’s green landing clearance signal. After spotting the signal, the captain initiated a right bank. During this maneuver, the aircraft entered an unrecoverable right-hand spin, lost control, and impacted the ground, catching fire.

=== Emergency response ===
Whilst the airport fire department reached the crash site within six minutes it was only able to extinguish the fire after approximately one hour. However, during the firefighting efforts the fire was contained to such an extent that the occupants of the aircraft could have been rescued if the impact had not already been fatal.

== Investigation and probable cause ==
The investigation determined that the accident was caused by pilot error. Due to a failure in radio communication, the captain had to rely on visual signals from the control tower to confirm landing clearance. This distraction lead to the captain losing situational awareness. As a result, the aircraft crashed before reaching the runway.
