= Avensa Flight 007 =

1983 flight which crashed while landing

Coordinates: 10°02′34″N 069°21′30″W

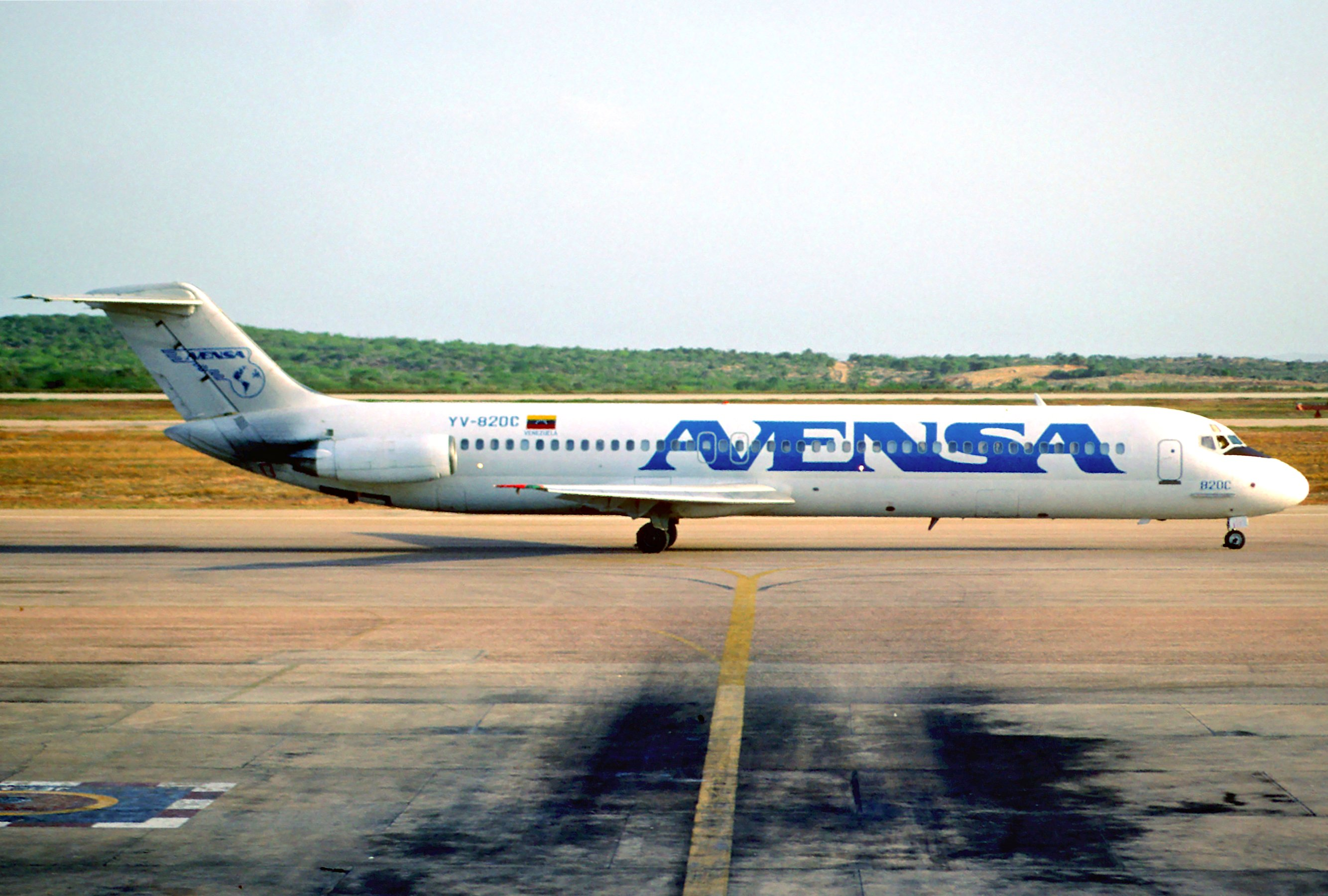
- An Avensa DC-9, similar to the aircraft involved in the accident

Accident
- Date: 11 March 1983
- Summary: Pilot error in bad weather
- Site: Barquisimeto Airport, Venezuela

Aircraft
- Aircraft type: Douglas DC-9-32
- Operator: Avensa
- IATA flight No.: VE007
- ICAO flight No.: AVE007
- Call sign: AVENSA 007
- Registration: YV-67C
- Flight origin: Caracas Airport, Venezuela
- Destination: Barquisimeto Airport, Venezuela
- Occupants: 50
- Passengers: 45
- Crew: 5
- Fatalities: 23
- Injuries: 10
- Survivors: 27

Avensa Flight 007 was a domestic Venezuelan flight operated by Avensa Airlines on a McDonnell Douglas DC-9-32, which crashed on 11 March 1983 on a domestic flight from Caracas Airport to Barquisimeto Airport, Venezuela. It landed hard, skidded off the runway and exploded. Twenty-two passengers and one crew member died.

== Accident ==
The Douglas DC-9, registration YV-67C, was on an internal flight when it made an ILS approach in thick fog at Barquisimeto Airport, Venezuela. The DC-9 landed hard 1,015 meters beyond the runway threshold, causing the landing gear to collapse. The aircraft subsequently slid off the runway and exploded. The aircraft was carrying 45 passengers and 5 crew, of whom one crewman and 22 of the passengers died. Ten passengers were seriously injured. Amongst the dead was Luis Enrique Arias, sports narrator of Venezolana de Televisión.

== Investigation ==
The probable causes were ruled to be "Improper in-flight decisions and inadequate supervision of the flight".
