= Avensa =

Venezuelan airline

Avensa - Aerovías Venezolanas Sociedad Anónima

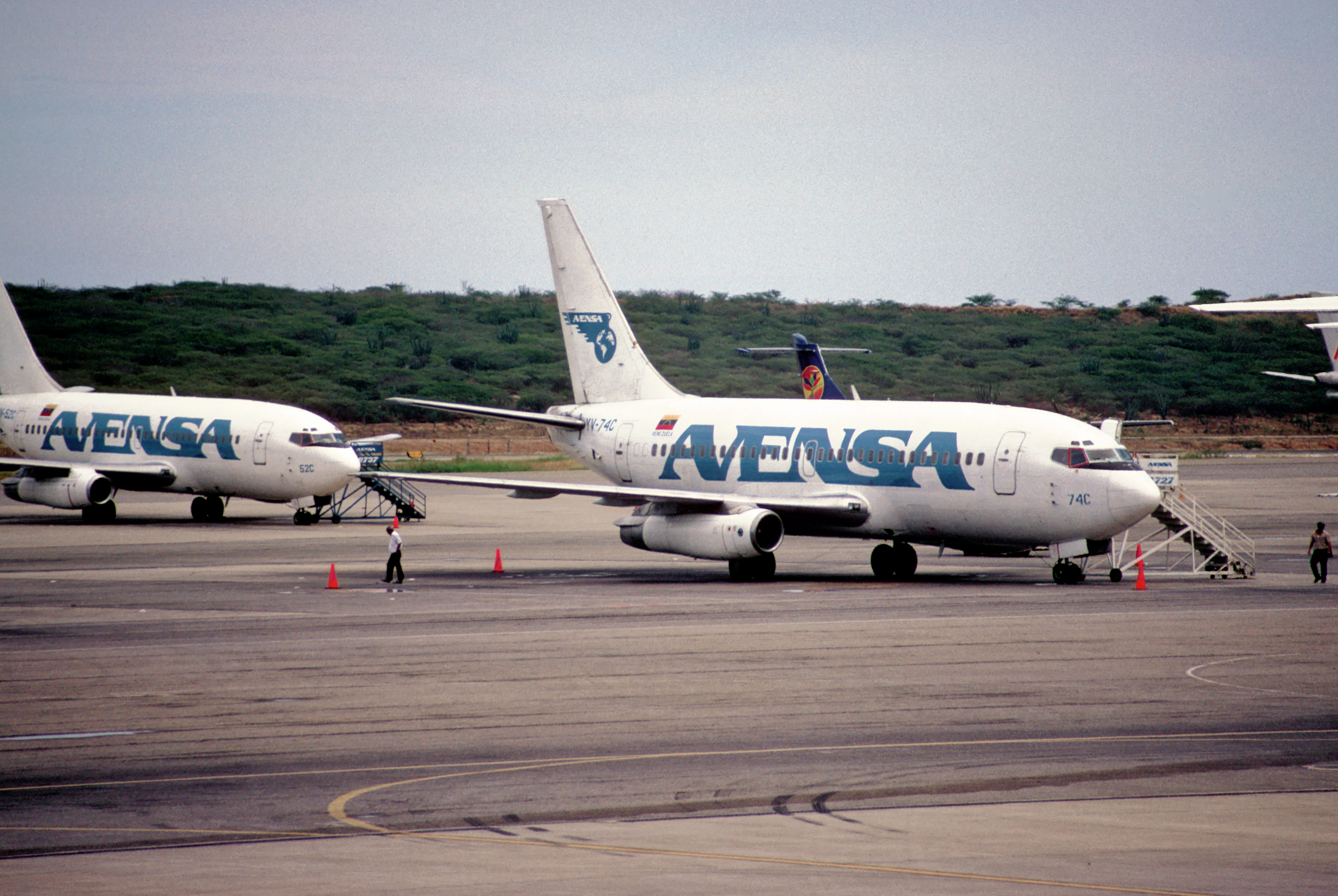
- Boeing 737-200
IATA	ICAO	Call sign
VE	AVE	AVENSA
- Founded: 13 May 1943
- Commenced operations: December 1943
- Ceased operations: 31 December 2004
- Hubs: Simón Bolívar International Airport
- Subsidiaries: Servivensa
- Fleet size: 3 (2004)
- Destinations: 7 (2004)
- Headquarters: Caracas, Venezuela
- Founder: Andres Boulton Pietri
- Website: www.avensa.com.ve

Avensa (Aerovías Venezolanas Sociedad Anonima) was one of the largest Venezuelan airlines, existing between 1943 and 2004, that operated from its hub at Simon Bolivar International Airport in Maiquetía.

At one time, it had its headquarters in the now Government-owned Torre El Chorro in Caracas and in the Torre Humboldt complex in East Caracas.

Although Avensa was reported to be in the process of economic restructuring, as of 2024, the airline has not been able to return to the skies.

== History ==
Avensa was created on 13 May 1943, as a cargo airline by the Venezuelan businessman, Andres Boulton Pietri (1909-1994), and Pan American World Airways. Its first flight occurred in December 1943, flying cargo to Venezuela's oil-rich Carteru region with Ford Trimotors and Stinson Reliants. By 1944, Avensa had started passenger flights with Lockheed 10A twins.

After World War II, Douglas DC-3s were added to the fleet. These were the backbone of the fleet until 1955 when Convair 340 twins were introduced for a new service to Miami. Avensa had set up an extensive domestic route network by the beginning of the 1960s. The airline also flew internationally to Miami, Aruba, Jamaica and New Orleans.

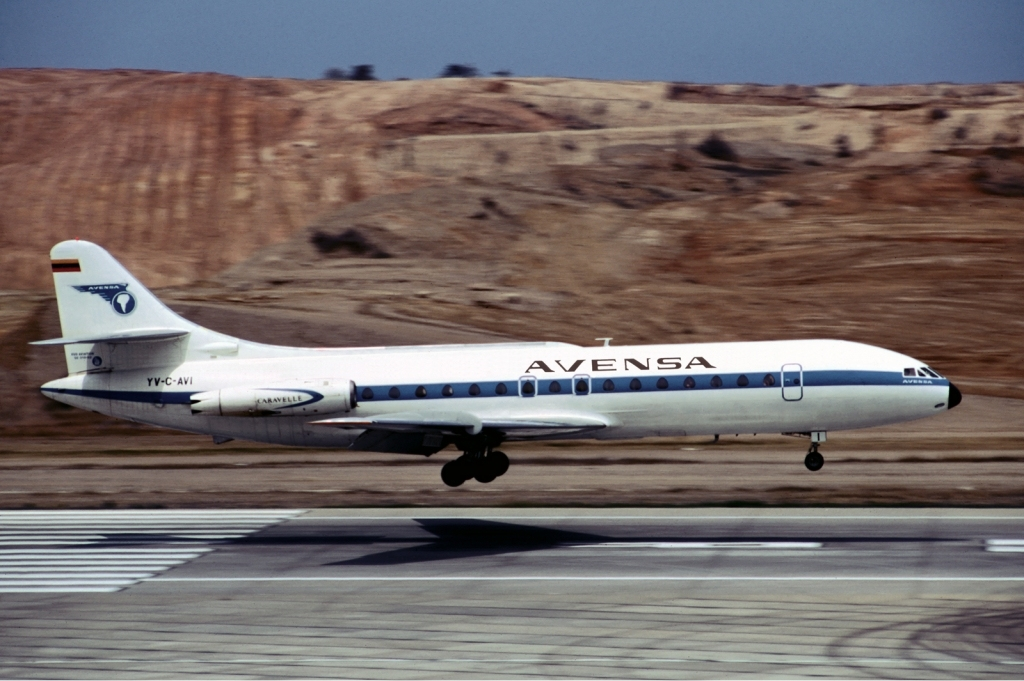
Avensa's only SE-210 Caravelle landing at Simón Bolívar International Airport in 1972

Avensa merged its international routes with the international routes of Línea Aeropostal Venezolana and the resulting network was the basis for a new international Venezuelan airline called Viasa, in which Avensa had a 45% holding. Avensa purchased jet equipment in the form of a single Sud Caravelle jet in 1964. Turboprop aircraft were introduced in 1966 when the airline purchased Convair 580s. McDonnell Douglas DC-9 jets were introduced to give the airline a competitive edge. Pan Am sold its 30% holding of Avensa to the Venezuelan government in 1976, making it completely state-owned.

Later, Avensa introduced the Boeing 727-100 with two Boeing 737-200s being later introduced. A fleet renewal program was set in motion at the end of the 1980s and new Boeing 737-200s were added. Two Boeing 757-200s were also introduced in the renewal program. These new aircraft were returned during the 1990s when Avensa fell into financial difficulties and had to make cutbacks. This left the fleet with eleven aging Boeing 727s, five DC-9s, and two 737-200s at the end of the 1990s.

Avensa took over many of the international routes formerly flown by Viasa after that airline collapsed in 1997. During the late 1990s, Avensa operated wide body McDonnell Douglas DC-10-30 flights to Europe including service to Lisbon, London, Madrid, Paris, Rome and Tenerife. Avensa also controlled a smaller low-cost airline called Servivensa, which primarily operated the Boeing 727 and DC-9 jets. Avensa later served only a domestic network of three cities as it attempted to reestablish services during a time of continuing financial difficulties.

The airline went into bankruptcy due to poor management in 2002, with Santa Barbara Airlines taking over its routes, although a single Embraer EMB 120 Brasilia continued to carry the Avensa name in service until it was grounded for good in 2004. Even though the airline ceased operations more than a decade ago, around Venezuela's airports, Avensa relics can be seen everywhere: old check-in signs, rusted luggage carts, derelict airplane stairways, the name still visible through cracked blue paint around Venezuela's airports.

== Destinations ==
This is the list of places to which Avensa flew:

=== Domestic ===
- Anaco
- Barcelona
- Barquisimeto
- Caracas Hub
- Carúpano
- Ciudad Bolivar
- Cumaná
- La Fría
- Las Piedras
- Maturín
- Mérida
- Porlamar
- Puerto Ordaz
- San Antonio del Táchira
- Santa Bárbara del Zulia
- Valencia
- Valera
- Maracaibo
- San Tomé

=== International ===
- Aruba
- Bogota, Colombia
- Bonaire
- Curaçao
- Lima, Peru
- Lisbon, Portugal
- London, UK
- Madrid, Spain
- Medellin, Colombia
- Mexico City, Mexico
- Miami, USA
- Milan, Italy
- Montreal, Canada (Charter)
- New York City (JFK)
- New Orleans, USA
- Oporto, Portugal
- Panama City, Panama
- Paris, France
- Quito, Ecuador
- Rio de Janeiro, Brazil
- Rome, Italy
- Santiago de Compostela, Spain
- São Paulo, Brazil
- Tenerife, Spain
- Toronto, Canada (Charter)

== Fleet ==
Over the years, Avensa had operated the following aircraft:

Avensa fleet
Aircraft	Total	Introduced	Retired	Notes
Boeing 727-100	11	1982	2002	Included the combi version for both passengers and freight pallets
Boeing 727-200	13	1979	2002	Included the combi version for both passengers and freight pallets
Boeing 737-200	3	1991	2002	
Boeing 737-300	1	1989	1996	Sold to Western Pacific Airlines
Boeing 757-200	2	1990	1994	
Convair CV-340	5	1954	1977	
Convair CV-440	3	1963	1977	
Convair CV-540	1	1963	1979	
Convair CV-580	10	1964	1991	
Curtiss C-46 Commando	4	1944	1946	
Douglas C-47 Skytrain	19	1946	1972	
Douglas C-54 Skymaster	4	1948	1955	
Douglas DC-2	5	1944	1946	
Douglas DC-3	11	1947	1973	
Douglas DC-6B	2	1958	1964	
Embraer EMB 120 Brasilia	1	2002	2004	Leased from Boeing Capital
Fairchild F-27	5	1958	1963	
Ford Trimotor	2	1943	1946	
Lockheed Model 10 Electra	1	Unknown	Unknown	
McDonnell Douglas DC-9-14	4	1967	1983	
McDonnell Douglas DC-9-15	2	1975	1978	Leased from McDonnell Douglas
McDonnell Douglas DC-9-31	1	1991	1996	
McDonnell Douglas DC-9-32	7	1976	1985	
McDonnell Douglas DC-9-51	4	1991	1999	
McDonnell Douglas DC-10-30	3	1998	2002	
Sud Aviation Caravelle	1	1970	1973	Written off

== Images gallery ==
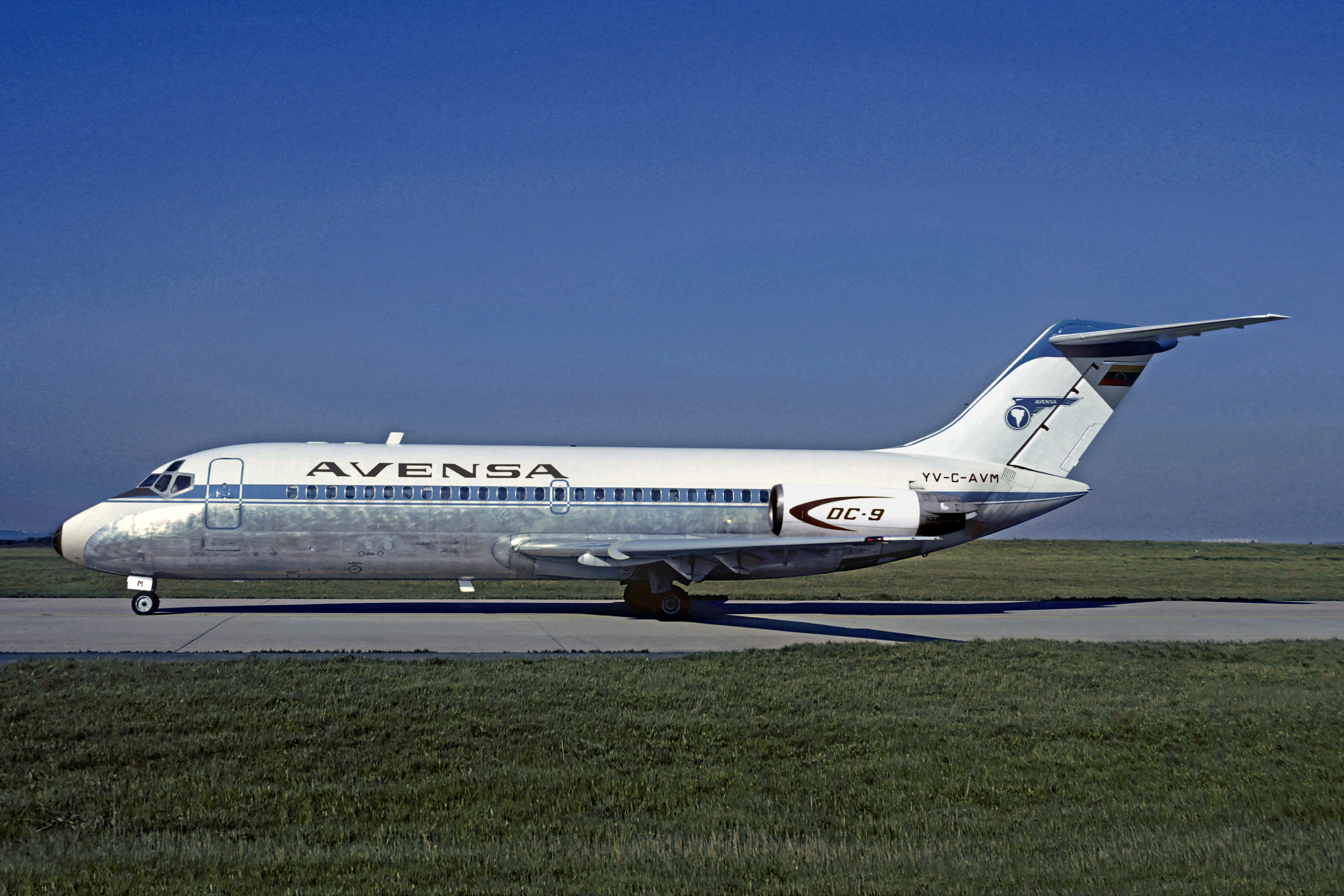
Douglas DC-9-15.

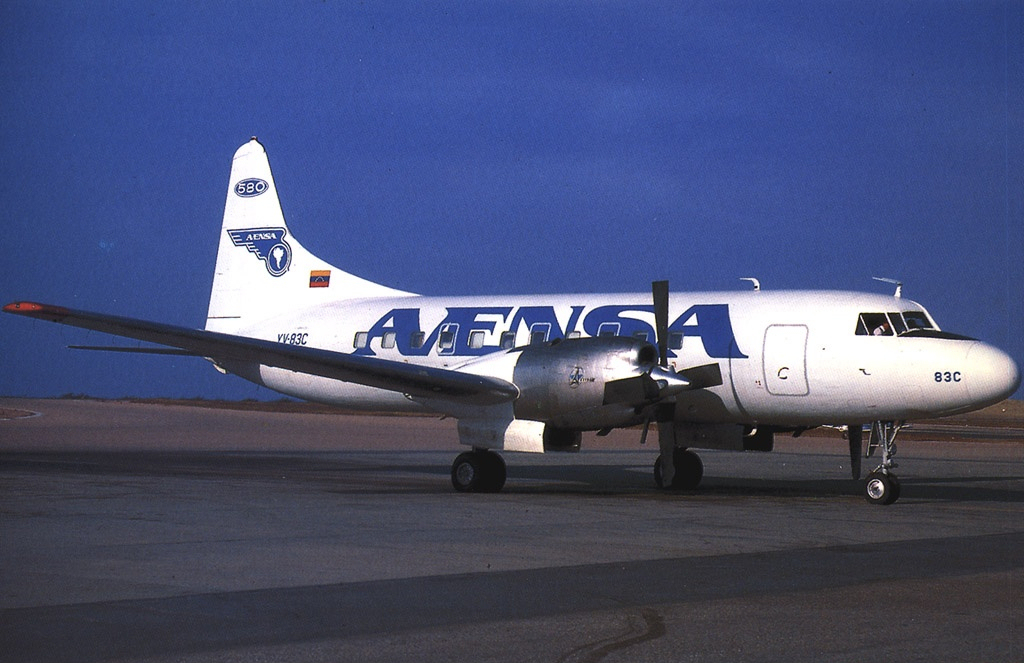
Convair CV-580 at Santiago Mariño Caribbean International Airport in 1988.

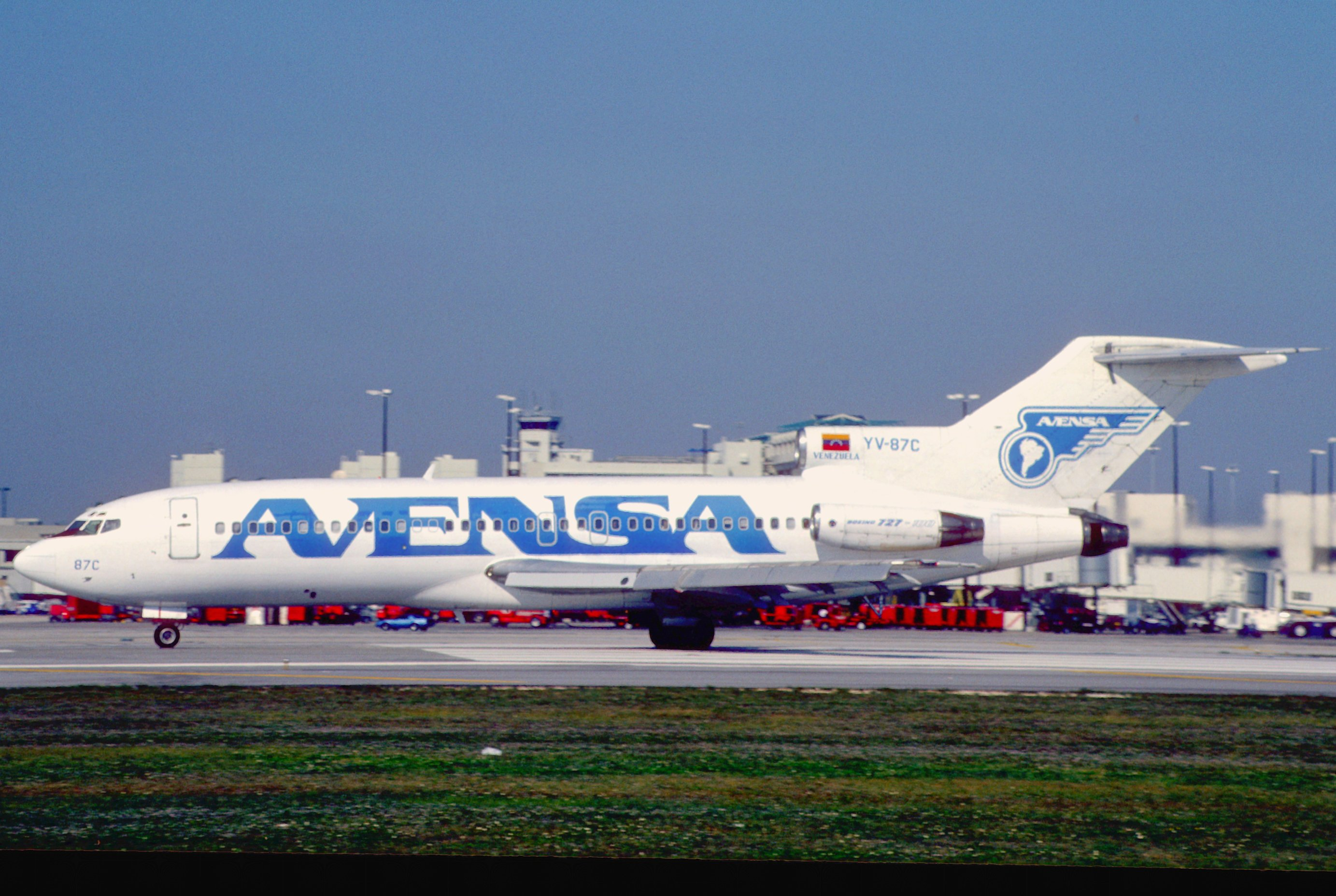
Boeing 727-100 taxiing at Miami International Airport in 1990.

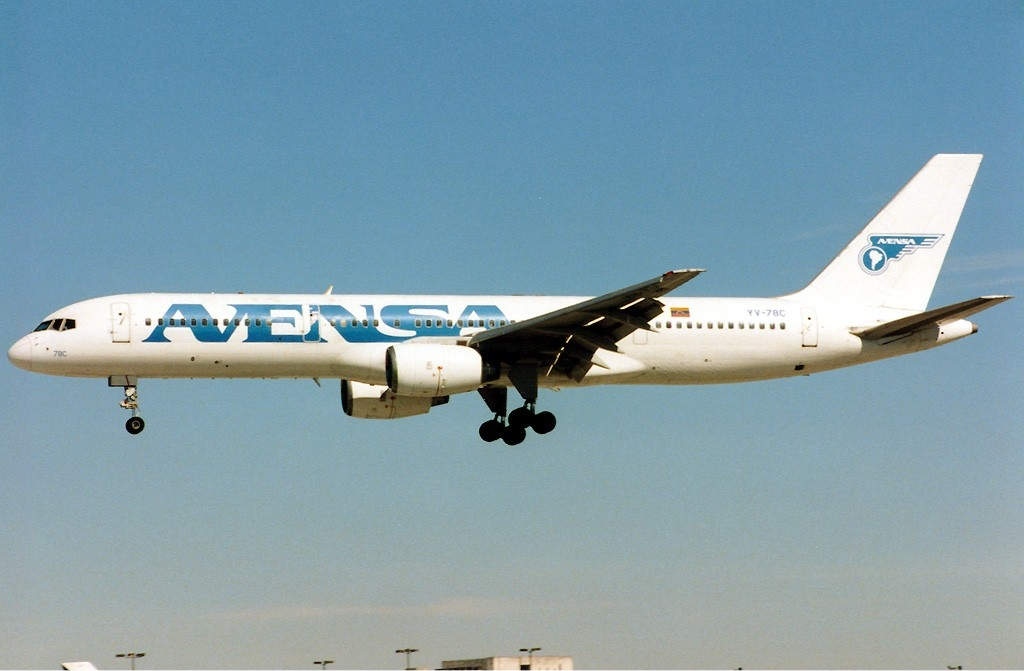
Boeing 757 landing at Miami International Airport.

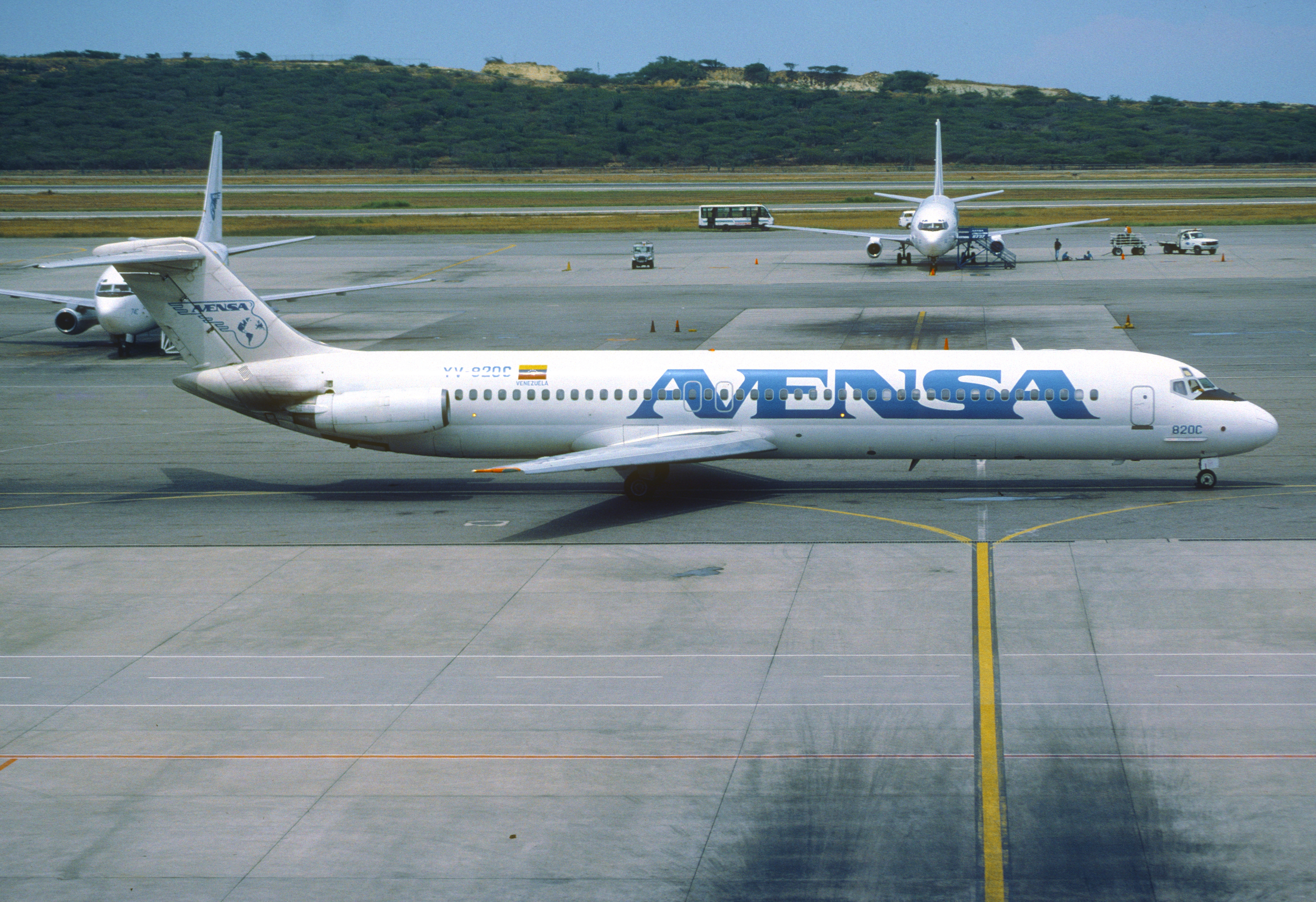
McDonnell Douglas DC-9-51 at Caracas-Simon Bolivar International Airport in 2000.

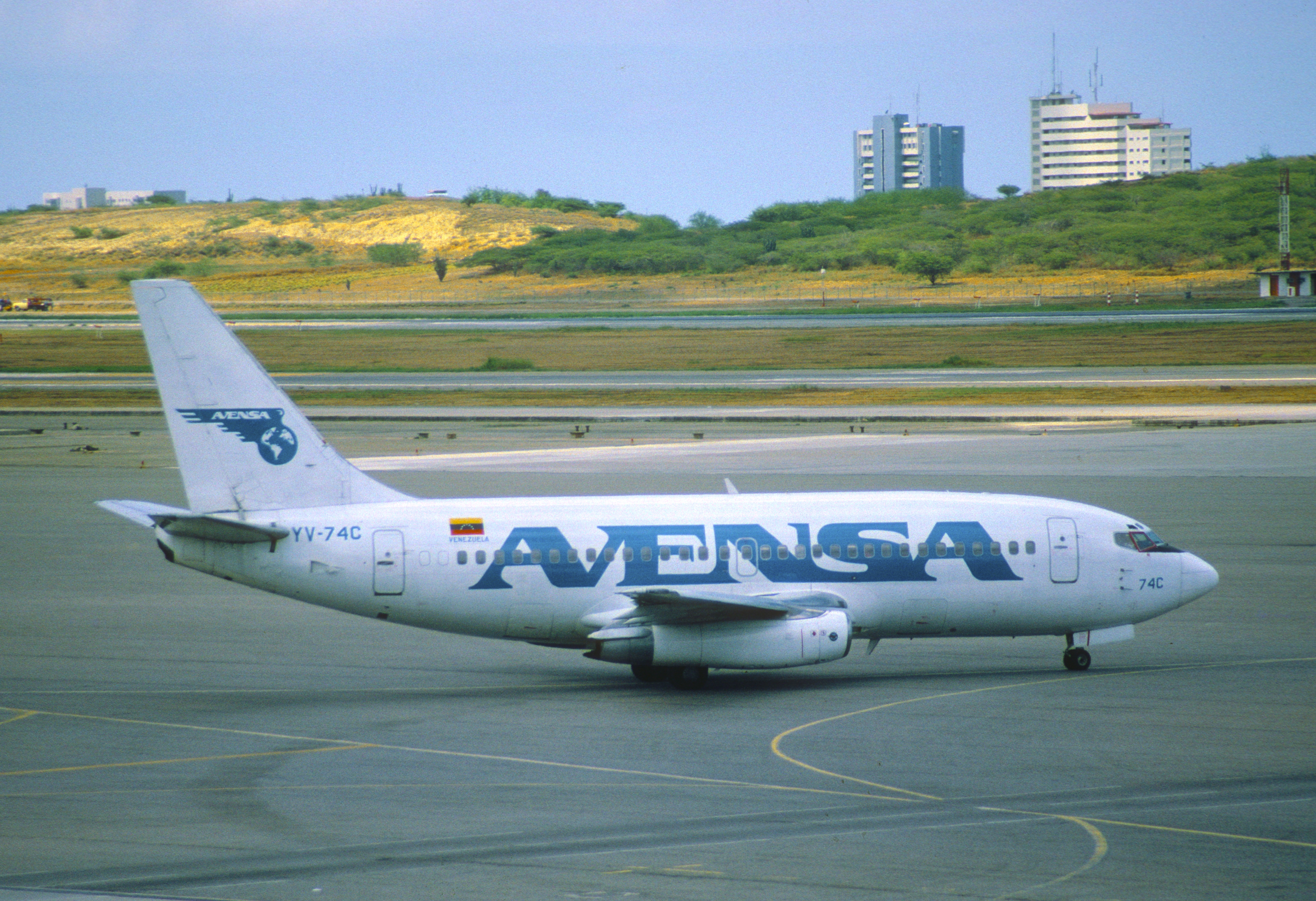
Boeing 737-200 taxiing at Caracas Simon Bolivar International Airport.

== Accidents and incidents ==
- On 20 August 1948, a Douglas DC-3 disappeared off the coast of Las Piedras, Falcón State. All 3 crew members died.
- On 27 November 1961, a Douglas DC-6B was hijacked by five armed students who forced the pilot to circle Caracas while they dropped anti-government leaflets on the city. After that, the crew was forced to fly them to Curaçao.
- On 25 February 1962, a Fairchild F-27 was descending through thick clouds until it crashed into a mountain on departure from Margarita Island. All 23 occupants on board were killed.
- On 28 November 1963, a Convair CV-440 (registered YV-C-AVH) was hijacked by six young rebels armed with machine guns shortly after it took off from Ciudad Bolívar. They forced the crew to circle the city while they dropped leaflets. They were later demanded to be flown to Port of Spain, Trinidad and Tobago where they surrendered.
- On 21 March 1968, a Convair CV-440 was hijacked to Cuba by three passengers.
- On 21 August 1973, a Sud Aviation Caravelle (registered YV-C-AVI) was landing at Jacinto Lara International Airport in Barquisimeto when its wing struck the runway on touchdown. No one on board was killed, but the aircraft was damaged beyond repair.
- On 22 December 1974, Avensa Flight 358 crashed in Maturín, shortly after take-off due to a double engine failure. All 75 passengers and crew were killed.
- On 11 March 1983, Avensa Flight 007 crashed at Barquisimeto Airport. 22 passengers and one crew were killed.

== See also ==
- List of defunct airlines of Venezuela
