= Viasa =

National airline of Venezuela (1960–1997)

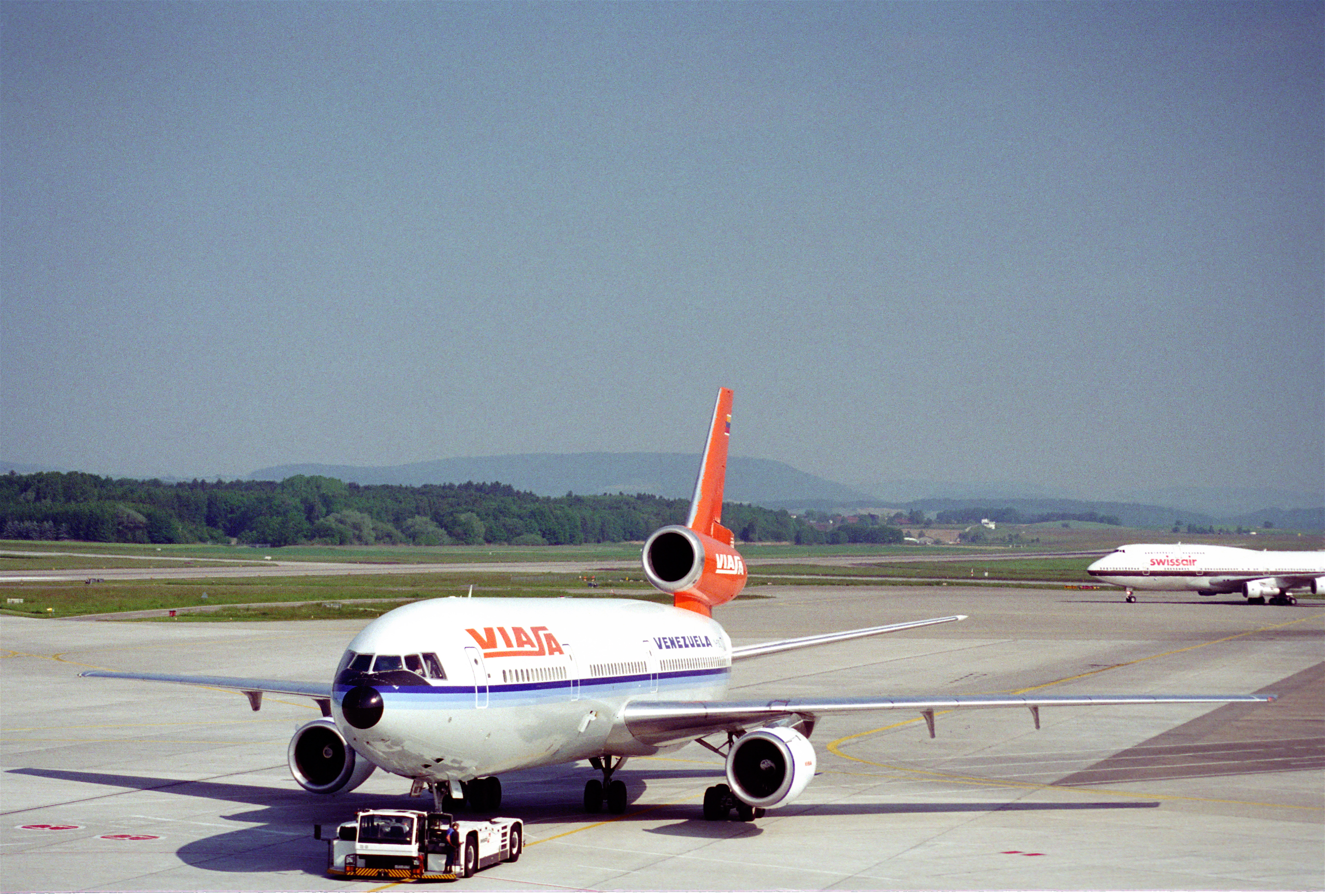
- Viasa DC 10, May 25, 1995 in the sunlight being pushbacked
IATA	ICAO	Call sign
VA	VIA	VIASA
- Founded: November 21, 1960
- Commenced operations: April 2, 1961
- Ceased operations: January 23, 1997
- Hubs: Simón Bolívar International Airport
- Headquarters: Caracas, Venezuela
- Key people: Manuel Mejia (CEO); Elias D. Lopez (President & Founder)

Venezolana Internacional de Aviación Sociedad Anónima (VIASA, 'Venezuelan International Airways JSC') was the Venezuelan flag carrier airline between 1960 and 1997. It was headquartered in the Torre Viasa in Caracas. Launched in November 1960, it was nationalised in 1975 due to financial problems, and re-privatised in 1991, with the major stake going to Iberia. The company ceased operations in January 1997, and went into liquidation.

== History ==
=== Early years ===
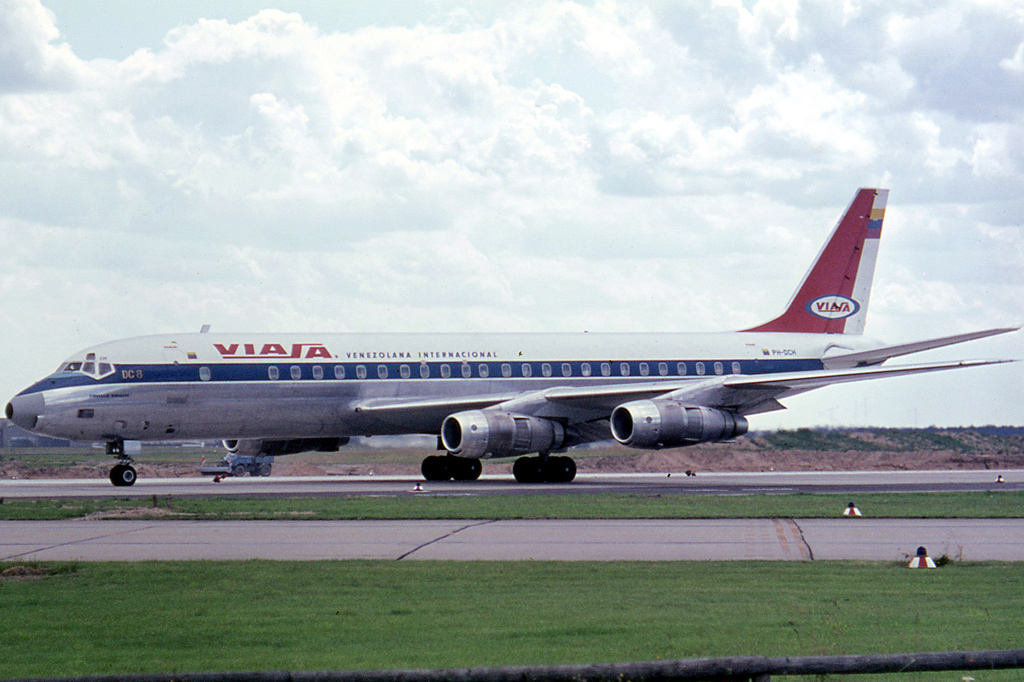
A Netherlands-registered Douglas DC-8-53 in VIASA livery. (1965)

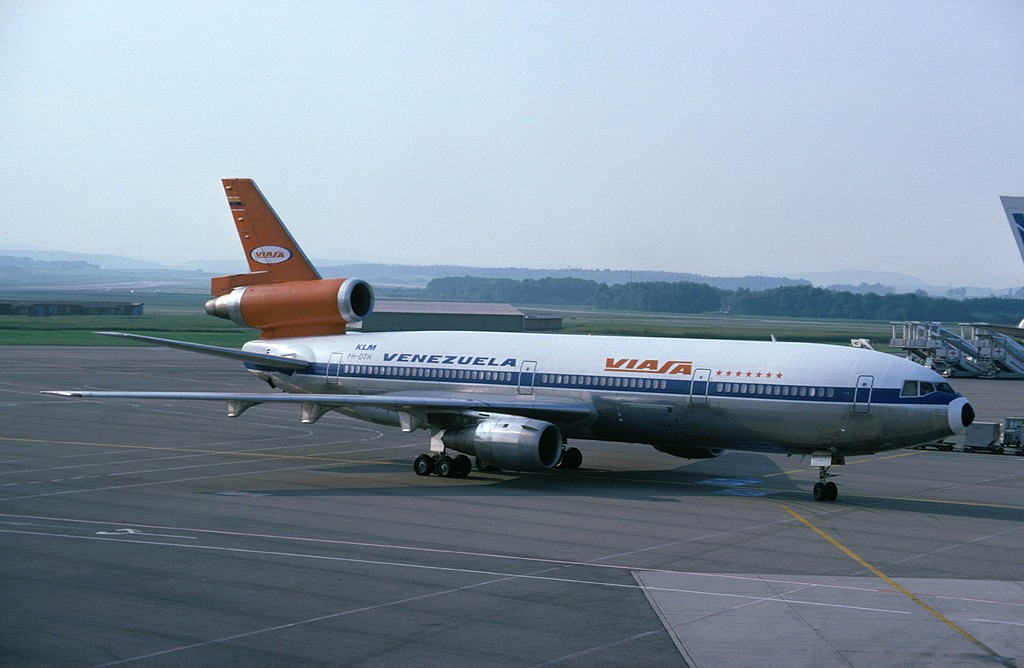
A Netherlands-registered McDonnell Douglas DC-10-30 at Zürich Airport in VIASA livery with additional KLM titles, in 1978. The aircraft was leased from KLM.

Viasa was envisioned by the government of Venezuela in 1959 to create a new company that could serve as the country's flag carrier and run without government intervention. It was set up in 1960 when the international routes operated by Línea Aeropostal Venezolana (LAV) and Avensa were merged and taken over by the newly created carrier. The government contributed with 55% of the capital, while private investors – among which were LAV and Avensa, the latter owned by Grupo Boulton and Pan American World Airways—contributed with the remainder. The board of directors came entirely from the private sector. The first president of the airline was Mr. R. van den Branden; the first chairman of the board was Mr. Oscar Augusto Machado Zuloaga, a very competent and well liked gentleman, who was instrumental in Viasa's commercial success and immediate acceptance by the market.

In early 1961, the airline signed an agreement with KLM to operate a Douglas DC-8 on Viasa's behalf, aimed at starting operations to Europe in April that year; KLM maintained a nurturing relationship with Viasa for another 24 years. In the same year, Avensa transferred two Douglas DC-6Bs to the company, as well as an order for a Convair 880-22M. Viasa boosted their Convair 880 order by purchasing another one. The airline flew the type mostly on routes to North America. Also in 1961, the airline joined the International Air Transport Association, becoming its 89th member. In 1963, Viasa started a commercial agreement with Iberia and KLM for operations through the mid-Atlantic. The same year, a third Convair 880 was ordered. Until the first DC-8-50 the company had ordered in early 1965 was delivered, long-haul services using the type were provided with wet-leased aircraft from KLM. The type was also chartered from KLM for deployment on the Caribbean routes. By April 1966, the first DC-8-50 was already forming part of the company's fleet along with the three Convair 880s, while an additional DC-8-50 was on order. To complement these two DC-8-50s, the carrier ordered two Douglas DC-8-63s in early 1967. Two Convair 880s were sold to Cathay Pacific in mid-1967. Also in 1967, Viasa started up a Panamanian airline named Panameña Internacional de Aviación SA (PAISA), with KLM support; This company began operations on 3 May 1967 with two DC-9-10s leased to VIASA from Avensa, which were in turn sub-leased to PAISA. In 1968, VIASA set up a wholly owned, non-IATA member, national cargo airline named Transportes Aereos de Carga SA, more commonly known as Transcarga, which in its beginnings served Caracas, Curaçao, Maracaibo, Miami and New York.

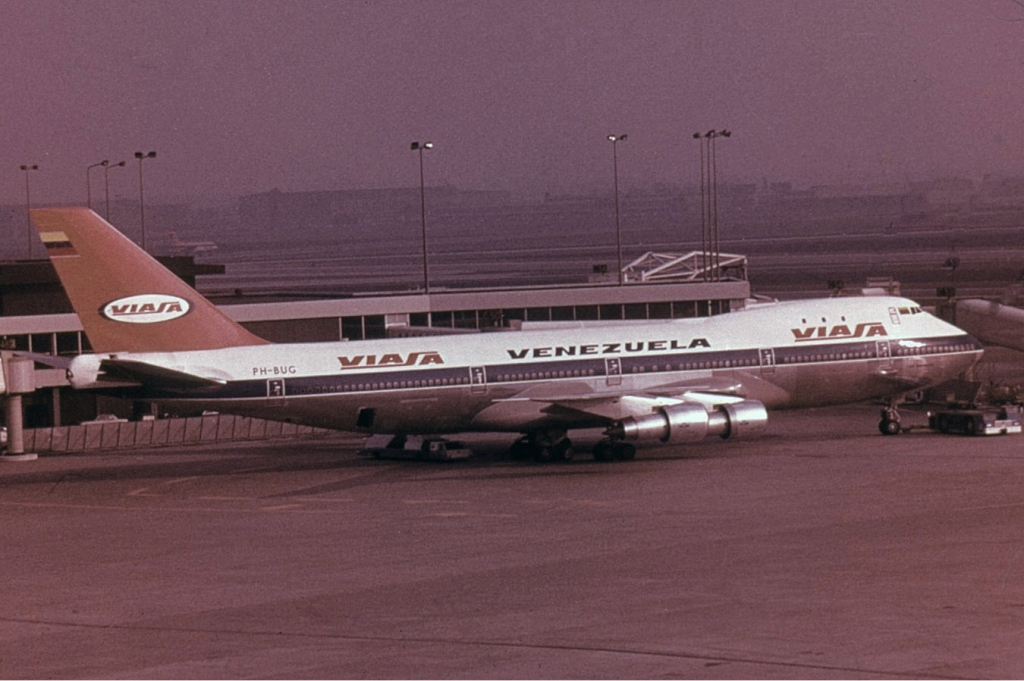
VIASA leased this Boeing 747-200B from KLM in 1972. The aircraft wore a mixed livery during the lease agreement, with the port side in KLM colours and its starboard with a VIASA decor.

In March 1970, the Government of Venezuela had a majority stake (55%) in the carrier, while the balance was held by private investors. Viasa's fleet strength at this time was eight: two DC-8-63s, two DC-8-50s, a DC-8-50F, a Convair 880, and two DC-9-10s. In November 1971 Viasa renewed the pool agreement with KLM and Iberia on their Caribbean–Europe services; to this purpose the company signed another agreement with the Dutch company in 1972, this time for the lease of a Boeing 747-200B that was put on service on a weekly round-trip Caracas–Madrid–Paris flight in April 1972. This event was a milestone for Viasa, as it became the first South American carrier to operate wide-body aircraft across the Atlantic. Through KLM, the company also placed an order for two McDonnell Douglas DC-10s the same year, and bought two Douglas DC-8-33s from the Dutch carrier as well. Also in 1972, the route network saw the incorporation of Washington and Toronto, Ontario, Canada.

With the lease of a Douglas DC-8-50 from KLM in 1974, and the sale of two aircraft of the same type to Aeroperú the same year, by March 1975 the Viasa's fleet consisted of two DC-8-63s, one DC-8-50, two DC-8-30s, and one DC-10-30, while another DC-10-30 was yet to be delivered. At a cost of US$30,000,000 (equivalent to $169,736,842 in 2025), another DC-10-30 was ordered in 1976, followed by an order for three more of these aircraft in July 1977.

In 1983, Viasa took delivery of two McDonnell Douglas DC-9 Super 80s. The early 1980s marked an overturn in the carrier's finances, as both the worldwide collapse of oil prices in the decade and the subsequent devaluation of the bolivar since 1983 (Note: The Venezuelan bolívar (VEB) devaluated from VEB4½ to VEB32 a dollar in five years.) affected the airline, which suffered a 41% drop in year-on-year traffic in 1983 and had accumulated a debt of VEB210 million in 1984, a year in which the carrier had a negative net value. That year, the crisis forced the company's work force to be cut by 30%, the fleet to be reduced (partly because of noise restrictions within the United States), and some Caribbean destinations to be dropped. Likewise, competition increased on some routes, most notably Miami and New York, where Viasa was the erstwhile sole operator or it had a single competitor at most. Nevertheless, Viasa made an operating profit of VEB125 million (US$4 million) and a net profit of VEB97 million in 1986. In early 1988, the fleet consisted of only five DC-10s, and two Airbus A300s acquired from Lufthansa through a leasing agreement, that were deployed mostly on domestic and regional routes. A Caracas–Havana service was launched in 1989, along with a stopover in São Paulo on the Caracas–Rio de Janeiro route. In March 1990, Viasa's fleet consisted of two Airbus A300B4s, one DC-8-61HF, and five DC-10-30s, and was wholly owned by the Venezuelan government. At this time, it served a network radiating from Barcelona, Caracas, Maracaibo and Porlamar to Amsterdam, Aruba, Bogotá, Buenos Aires, Curaçao, Frankfurt, Houston, Lima, Lisbon, London, Madrid, Miami, Milan, New York, Porto, Paris, Quito, Rio de Janeiro, Rome, Santiago, Santiago de Compostela, Santo Domingo, San Juan and Zurich. Toronto and Vancouver were served on a seasonal basis.

=== Nationalisation ===
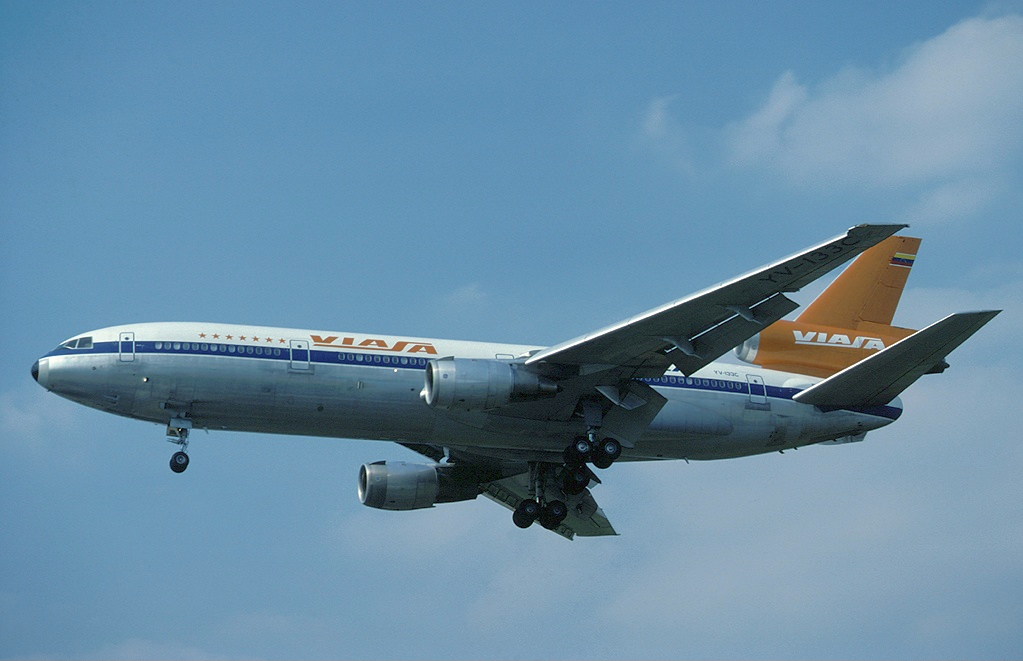
A Viasa McDonnell Douglas DC-10-30 at Heathrow Airport. (1982)

Viasa had been a model of good management and it had returned a profit every year since its creation. Viasa posted its first ever loss for the October 1975 – September 1976 fiscal year, plagued by rising fuel costs and union problems. The government nationalised the airline and began its downturn. This was not noticeable at first, since Venezuela's strong economy was backed by high oil revenue and the government did not mind pumping in money to cover mounting losses.

By 1979, Viasa had built a fleet of 6 DC-10-30s, 2 DC-8-63s, 2 DC-8-53s and 1 DC-8-63F.

In the summer of 1982, Viasa leased a couple of MD-82s from KLM for Caribbean routes and for new flights from Barquisimeto, Barcelona and Porlamar to Miami. These were returned to KLM in 1984.

In 1985, Viasa got rid of all its DC-8s plus one DC-10-30 and kept just five DC-10-30s. It revamped its livery almost completely in 1986, adopting a whiter body with three-tone blue cheatlines under the windows. The orange tail retained the white Viasa letters adopted in 1978 with the arrival of DC-10-30 YV-135C.

Two former Lufthansa Airbus A300-B4 jets were leased from GPA in 1987 for United States and South American services. In the same year, for the first time ever, VIASA began domestic services and made use of empty seats on the Caracas-Maracaibo and Caracas-Porlamar routes.

=== Privatisation ===
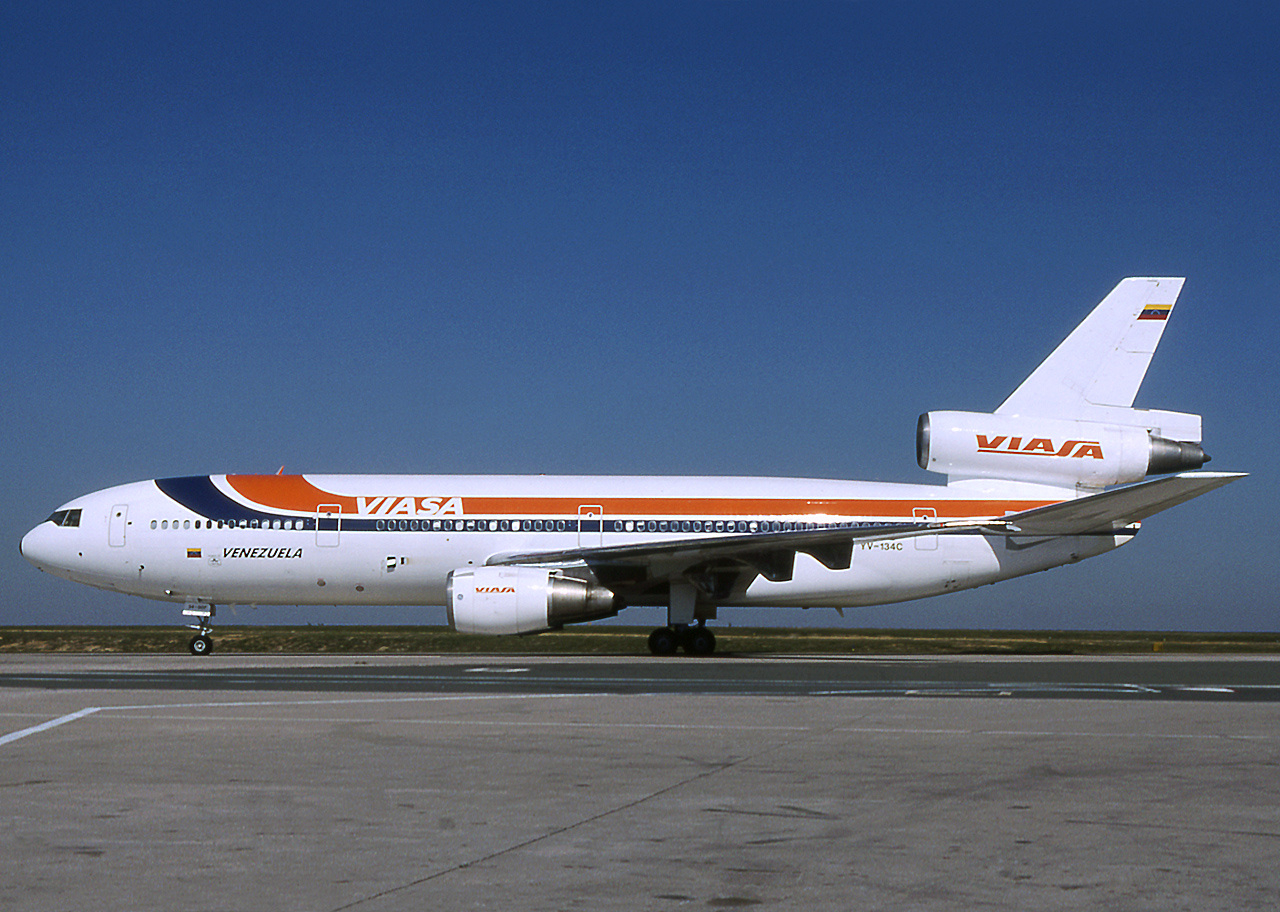
A VIASA McDonnell Douglas DC-10-30 at Charles de Gaulle Airport in 1996. The aircraft is wearing the livery used by the company throughout the Iberia management.

The red ink continued to flow and, with the new government policies adopted in 1989, Viasa became a target for privatisation. The initial plans of the government were to allocate 60% of the company to private investors, keep 20% of the shares, and transfer the balance to the airline workers. In June 1991, Iberia and KLM were approved as bidders in the privatisation process, the former teaming up with Venezuela's Banco Provincial, and the latter partnering with Northwest Airlines and other four local entities. Iberia was the only bidder left with a US$145.5 million offer, after KLM stepped aside citing that a price of US$81 million for 60% of the shares was too high.

Iberia apparently milked the airline (some Venezuelans point at this as one of Viasa's causes of bankruptcy). While it could be argued that it was not wise to sell a government owned leasing company to another government owned leasing company, changing the old ways of Viasa was an uphill battle. All its aircraft were placed under Iberia's ownership, the Airbuses were sent back to GPA, former Iberia 727s were used by Viasa (competing on the US routes versus American's 757s or A300-600s and United's 757s) and all supplies were purchased centrally through Madrid.

Short of liquidity, Viasa ceased operations on 23 January 1997. Operations came to a halt following the pilots and cabin crew staff rejecting a restructuring plan raised by Iberia and the state-run holding company that had a 40% interest in Viasa at that time, with both consortiums refusing to inject more cash into the airline. Shareholders, with Iberia being the major one having 45% of the stakes at the time, later decided to liquidate the carrier. Viasa's routes were divided between Aeropostal, Avensa and Aserca.

== Destinations ==
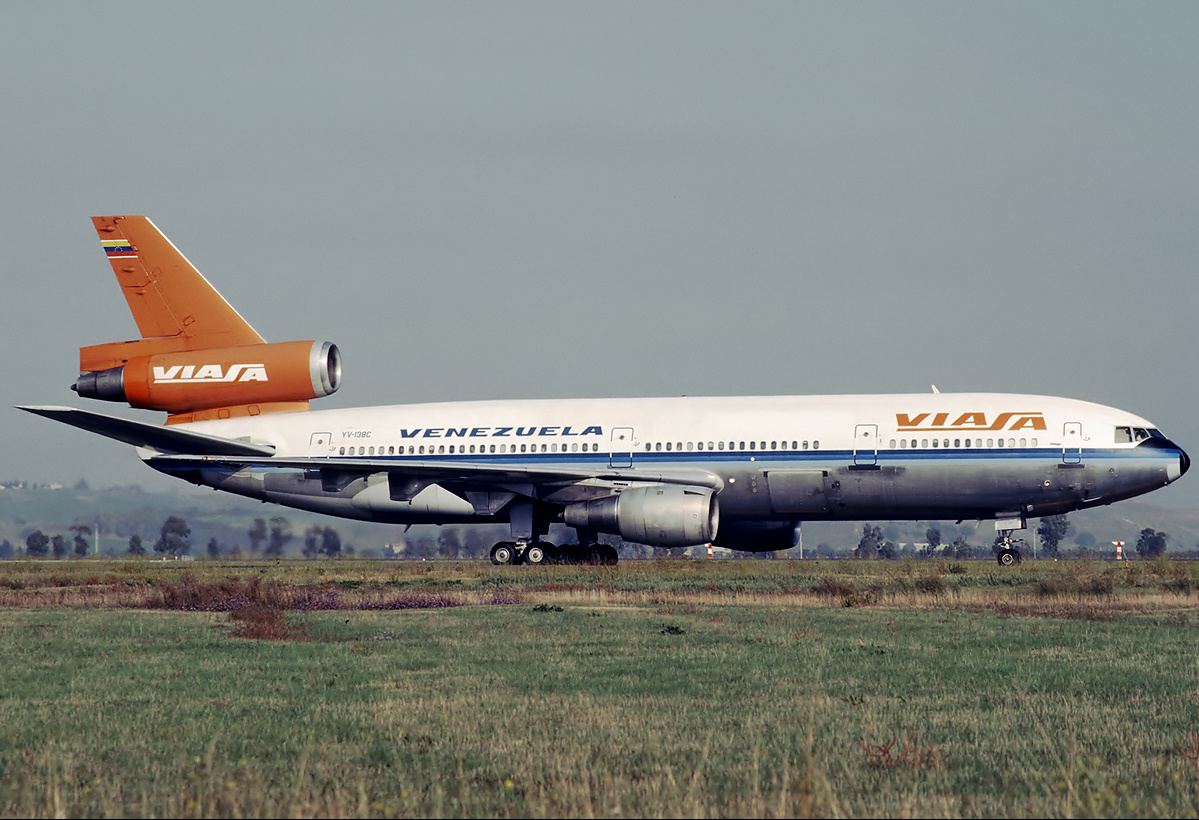
A VIASA McDonnell Douglas DC-10-30 at Fiumicino Airport, Rome, Italy in 1987.

Following is a list of destinations Viasa flew to as part of its scheduled destinations.

Country	City	Airport	Ref(s)
Argentina	Buenos Aires	Ministro Pistarini International Airport	
Aruba	Oranjestad	Queen Beatrix International Airport	
Barbados	Bridgetown	Grantley Adams International Airport	
Brazil	Rio de Janeiro	Rio de Janeiro/Galeão International Airport	
Brazil	São Paulo	São Paulo/Guarulhos International Airport	
Canada	Toronto	Toronto Pearson International Airport	
Canada	Vancouver	Vancouver International Airport	
Chile	Santiago	Arturo Merino Benítez International Airport	
Colombia	Bogotá	El Dorado International Airport	
Colombia	Cartagena	Rafael Núñez International Airport	
Costa Rica	San Jose	Juan Santamaría International Airport	
Cuba	Havana	José Martí International Airport	
Curaçao	Willemstad	Hato International Airport	
Dominican Republic	Punta Cana	Punta Cana International Airport	
Dominican Republic	Santo Domingo	Las Américas International Airport	
Ecuador	Quito	Mariscal Sucre International Airport	
France	Paris	Orly Airport	
France	Pointe-à-Pitre	Pointe-à-Pitre International Airport	
Germany	Frankfurt	Frankfurt Airport	
Italy	Milan	Milan Malpensa Airport	
Italy	Rome	Leonardo da Vinci–Fiumicino Airport	
Mexico	Cancún	Cancún International Airport	
Mexico	Mexico City	Mexico City International Airport	
Netherlands	Amsterdam	Amsterdam Airport Schiphol	
Panama	Panama City	Tocumen International Airport	
Peru	Lima	Jorge Chávez International Airport	
Portugal	Lisbon	Lisbon Portela Airport	
Portugal	Porto	Francisco de Sá Carneiro Airport	
Portugal	Santa Maria	Santa Maria Airport	
Puerto Rico	San Juan	Luis Muñoz Marín International Airport	
Sint Maarten	Philipsburg	Princess Juliana International Airport	
Spain	Madrid	Adolfo Suárez Madrid–Barajas Airport	
Spain	Santiago de Compostela	Santiago–Rosalía de Castro Airport	
Switzerland	Zurich	Zurich Airport	
Trinidad and Tobago	Port of Spain	Piarco International Airport	
United Kingdom	London	Heathrow Airport	
United States of America	Houston	George Bush Intercontinental Airport	
United States of America	Miami	Miami International Airport	
United States of America	New York City	John F. Kennedy International Airport	
United States of America	Washington, D.C.	Washington Dulles International Airport	
Venezuela	Barcelona	General José Antonio Anzoátegui International Airport	
Venezuela	Barquisimeto	Jacinto Lara International Airport	
Venezuela	Caracas	Simón Bolívar International Airport	
Venezuela	Maracaibo	La Chinita International Airport	
Venezuela	Porlamar	Del Caribe "Santiago Mariño" International Airport	

== Fleet ==
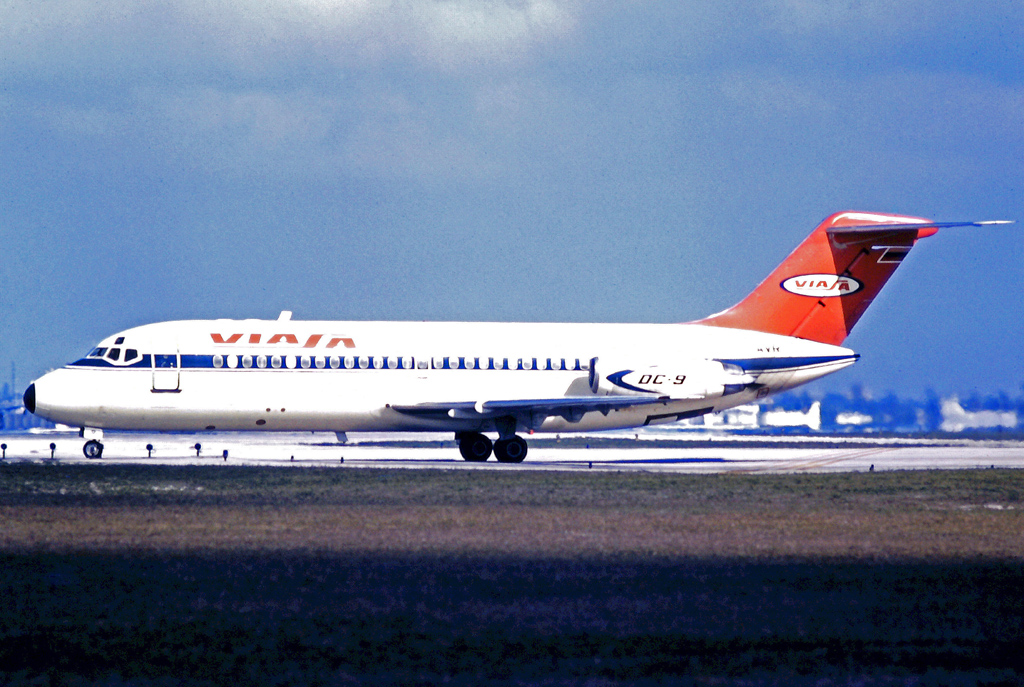
Viasa Douglas DC-9-14 operating a scheduled service at Miami International Airport in 1971

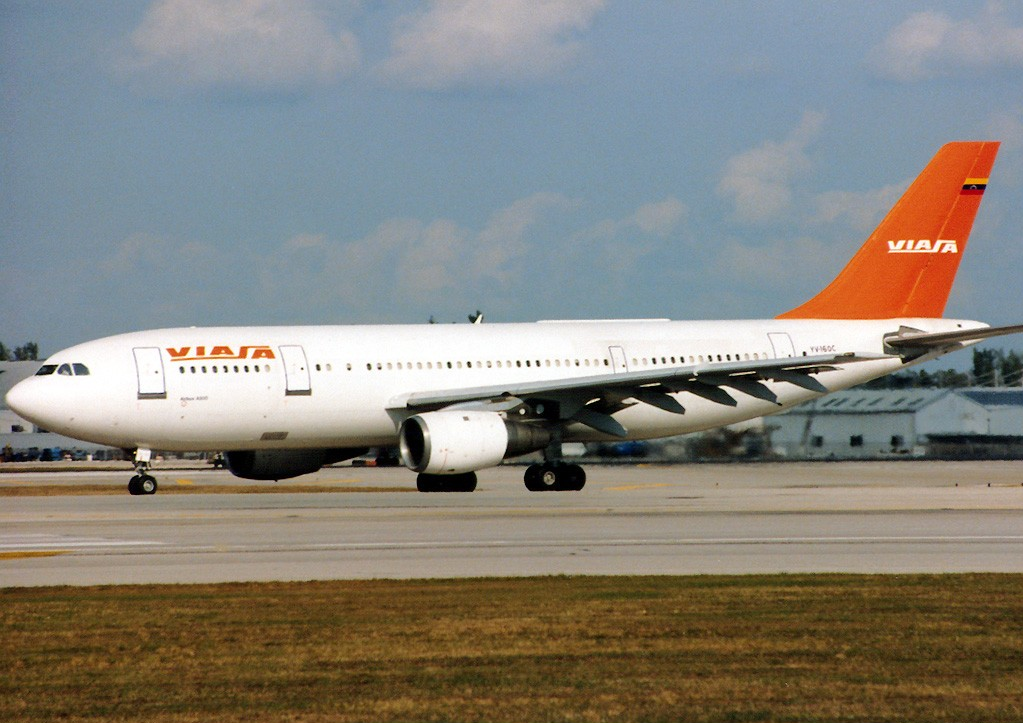
A VIASA Airbus A300B4-200 at Miami International Airport. (1993)

Viasa previously operated the following aircraft:

- Airbus A300B4
- Airbus A300C4
- Boeing 747-100
- Boeing 747-200B
- Boeing 747-200C
- Boeing 747-200F
- Boeing 727-200
- Convair 880
- Curtiss C-46
- Douglas DC-7C
- Douglas DC-7F
- Douglas DC-8-30
- Douglas DC-8-40
- Douglas DC-8-50
- Douglas DC-8-60
- Douglas DC-6B
- Douglas DC-9-10
- Douglas DC-9-30
- Lockheed Super Constellation
- McDonnell Douglas DC-10-30
- McDonnell Douglas MD-80

=== Livery ===
The airline's livery consisted of silver on the belly, white on the top part of the fuselage color, with orange and blue cheatlines that went all the way to the start of the tail. The fuselage featured the name Viasa written in orange on top of the cheatlines. The tail was all orange, with the name Viasa in white. After Iberia took over, all the fuselage went white, and so did the tail. The cheatlines were made thicker around the plane's cockpit, to resemble Iberia's planes.

== Accidents and incidents ==
According to Aviation Safety Network, Viasa experienced five accidents/incidents events throughout its history, with two of them being deadly ones, yielding a combined death toll of 216 fatalities, plus a hijacking episode. The two deadly accidents occurred with leased aircraft. Following is a list of the events that carried with the hull-loss of the aircraft involved. The worst accident experienced by the company, and also the worst aviation disaster at the time it took place, occurred in March 1969, and killed all 84 occupants of the aircraft plus 71 people on the ground.

Date	Location	Aircraft	Tail number	Aircraft damage	Fatalities	Description	Refs
30 May 1961	(Portugal) Off Fonte da Telha	DC-8-53	PH-DCL	W/O	61/61	The aircraft, leased from KLM, was due to operate the third leg of an international scheduled Rome–Madrid–Lisbon–Santa Maria–Caracas passenger service as Flight 897, when it plunged into the sea shortly after takeoff from Portela Airport, 3 km (1.9 mi) east-northeast of Fonte da Telha.	
29 June 1968	(Netherlands) Amsterdam	DC-8-53	PH-DCH	W/O	0	The aircraft was destroyed by fire while undergoing maintenance at Schiphol Airport owing to an explosion in one of its engines. The aircraft was on lease from KLM.	
16 March 1969	(Venezuela) Maracaibo	DC-9-32	YV-C-AVD	W/O	155	Leased from AVENSA, the aircraft was due to operate the second leg of an international scheduled Caracas–Maracaibo–Miami passenger service as Flight 742, when it performed a long take-off at Grano de Oro Airport, hit powerlines, and plunged into a nearby crowded neighborhood of the city. All 84 occupants of the aircraft perished in the accident, plus 71 people on the ground.	
26 November 1993	(Argentina) Buenos Aires	DC-10-30	YV-135C	W/O	0/123	Inbound from Caracas as Flight 940, the aircraft started aquaplaning immediately after touchdown in bad weather at Ezeiza Airport. Overran the runway threshold by 180 m (590 ft). The nosegear collapsed, causing both port and starboard engines to strike the ground.	

== See also ==
- Transportation in Venezuela
