= Avensa Flight 358 =

1974 aviation accident

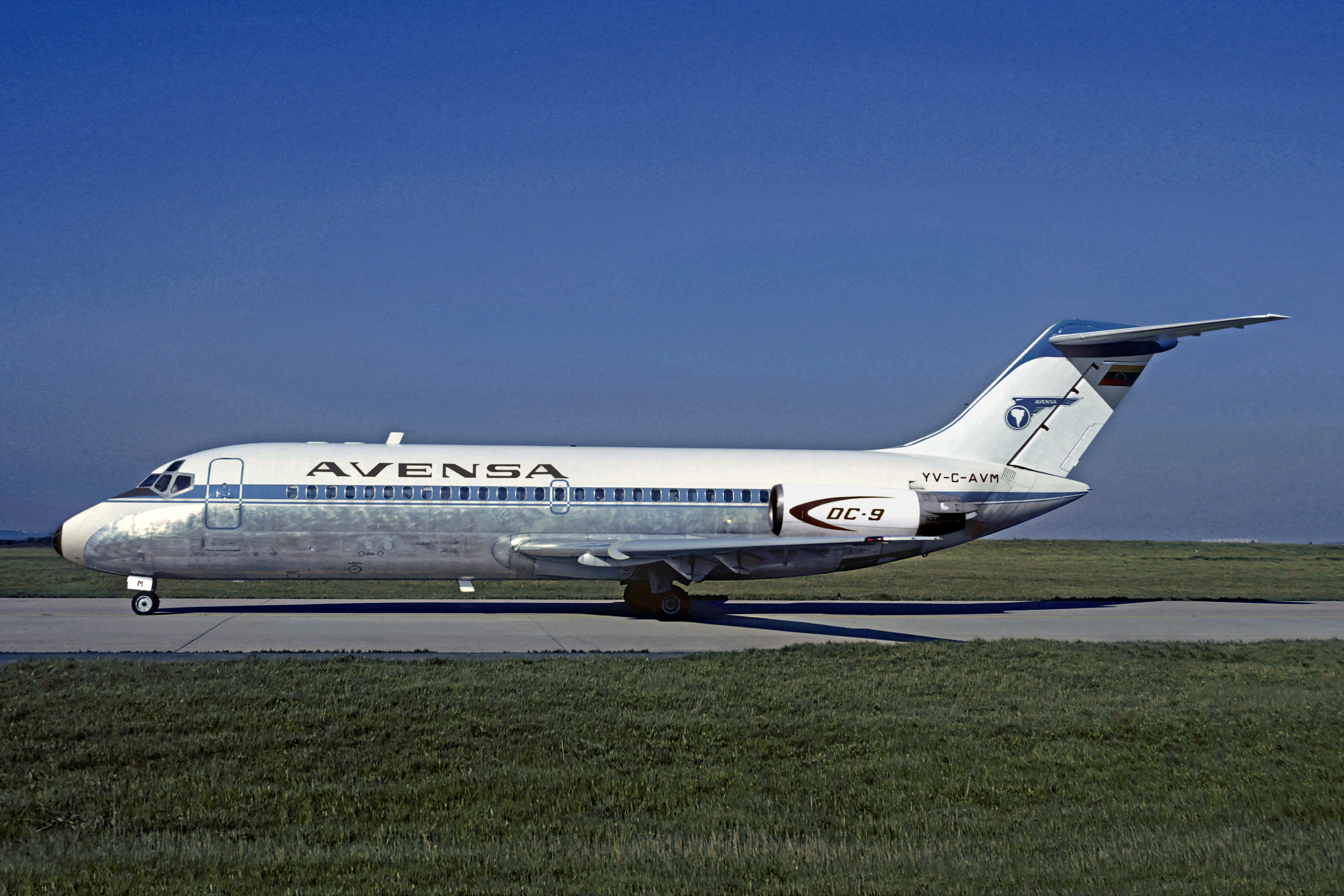
- YV-C-AVM, the aircraft involved in the accident, in 1967 in a previous livery

Accident
- Date: 22 December 1974
- Summary: Loss of control for undetermined reasons
- Site: Near Maturín Airport, Maturín, Venezuela; 9°46′N 63°10′W

Aircraft
- Aircraft type: McDonnell Douglas DC-9-14
- Operator: Avensa
- IATA flight No.: VE358
- ICAO flight No.: AVE358
- Call sign: AVENSA 358
- Registration: YV-C-AVM
- Flight origin: Maturín Airport, Venezuela
- Destination: Simón Bolívar International Airport, Venezuela
- Passengers: 69
- Crew: 6
- Fatalities: 75
- Survivors: 0

Avensa Flight 358 was a scheduled domestic flight from Maturín Airport to Simón Bolívar International Airport in Venezuela. On 22 December 1974, the McDonnell Douglas DC-9-14 operating the flight crashed from the city of Maturín, killing all 75 people on board.

== Aircraft ==
The aircraft involved was a seven-year-old DC-9-14, which had been delivered to Avensa from McDonnell Douglas in 1967.

== Accident ==
On 22 December 1974, the McDonnell Douglas DC-9, with 69 passengers and 6 crew on board, took off on runway 05 from Maturín Airport. In command was 49-year-old Captain Diógenes Torrellas Leon, a veteran pilot with 25,000 hours of flying time, and the First Officer was Norberto Vivas Uzcátegui, 34. Five minutes after takeoff the pilots declared an emergency to the control tower. The pilots lost control of the aircraft and crashed 32 km (20 mi; 17 nmi) from the city of Maturín, Venezuela. All 75 on board the flight perished.

== Cause ==
Venezuelan authorities and the United States National Transportation Safety Board (NTSB) investigated the accident. The cause of the accident was not determined, though an elevator malfunction was considered.

== See also ==
- Aviation accidents and incidents
- List of aircraft accidents and incidents resulting in at least 50 fatalities
- List of accidents and incidents involving commercial aircraft
