= Servivensa =

Venezuelan airline

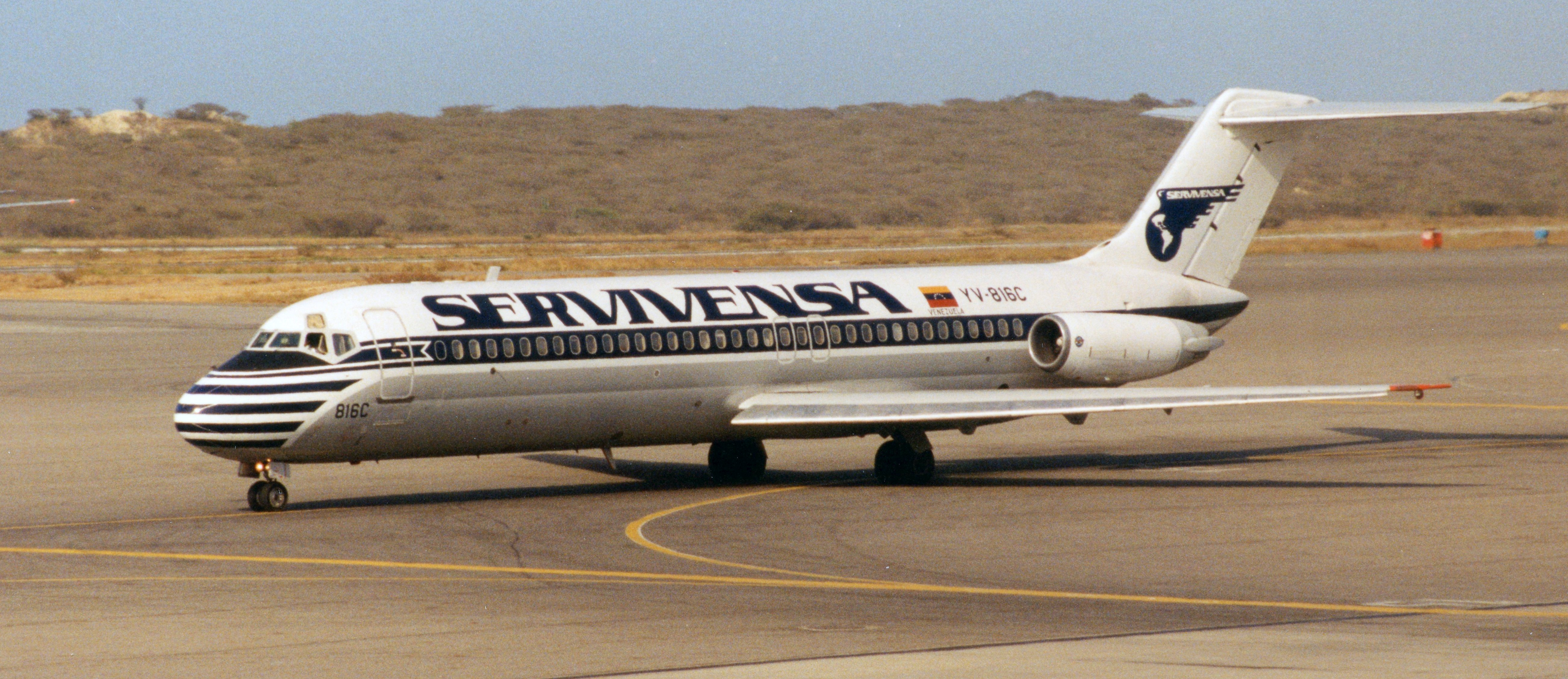
IATA	ICAO	Call sign
VC	SVV	SERVIVENSA
- Founded: 1989
- Ceased operations: 1 May 2003; 23 years ago
- Hubs: Simón Bolívar International Airport
- Alliance: Aeroperú (1999)
- Parent company: Avensa
- Headquarters: Caracas, Venezuela

Servivensa S.A. (legally Servicios Avensa S.A.) was a low-cost airline based in Caracas, Venezuela that operated scheduled domestic and international flights.

== History ==
Servivensa was established by Avensa in 1989 to counteract the unionized workforce demands of Avensa's employees. By the mid-1990's, it had grown to become larger than its parent company, and Servivensa crews of contract workers began operating Avensa aircraft. However, Venezuela's macroeconomic problems, especially its currency exchange restrictions, caused the airline to have trouble procuring spare parts and led to the widespread grounding of its aircraft.

For a short time in 1999, the airline had a short-lived alliance with Aeroperú named Alianza Andes that operated codeshare flights between Caracas and Lima.

By 2001, Servivensa and Avensa were close to bankruptcy and were being sued by BP for over $1 million in unpaid fuel bills. Servivensa operations were officially ceased on May 1, 2003, when its parent company, Avensa announced that it was grounding its aircraft due to a drop in demand of air traffic.

== Fleet ==
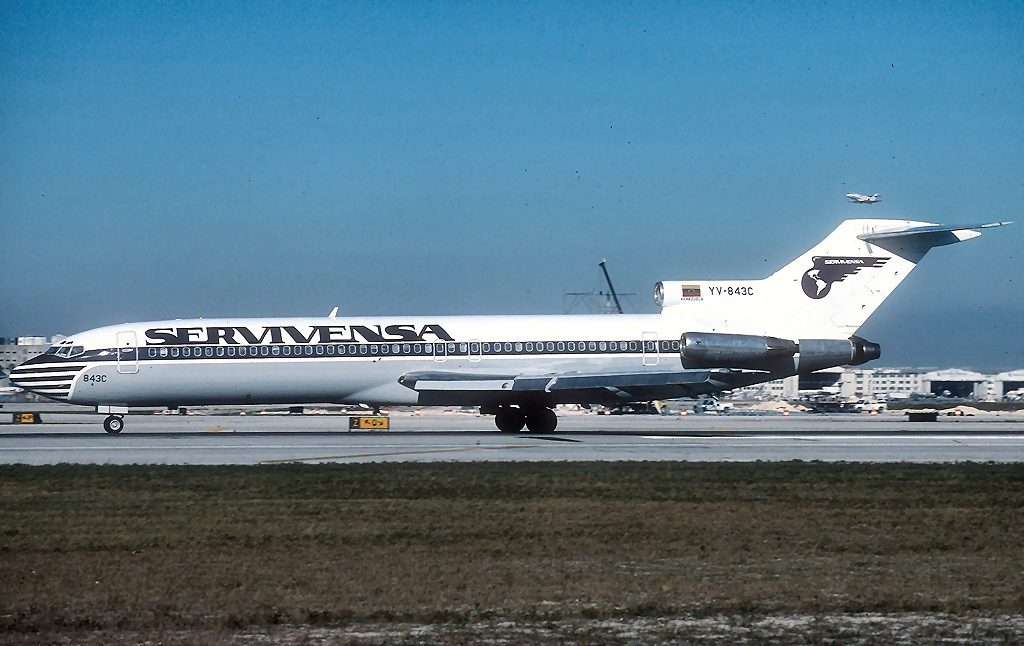
A Servivensa Boeing 727-200 at Miami International Airport in 1997

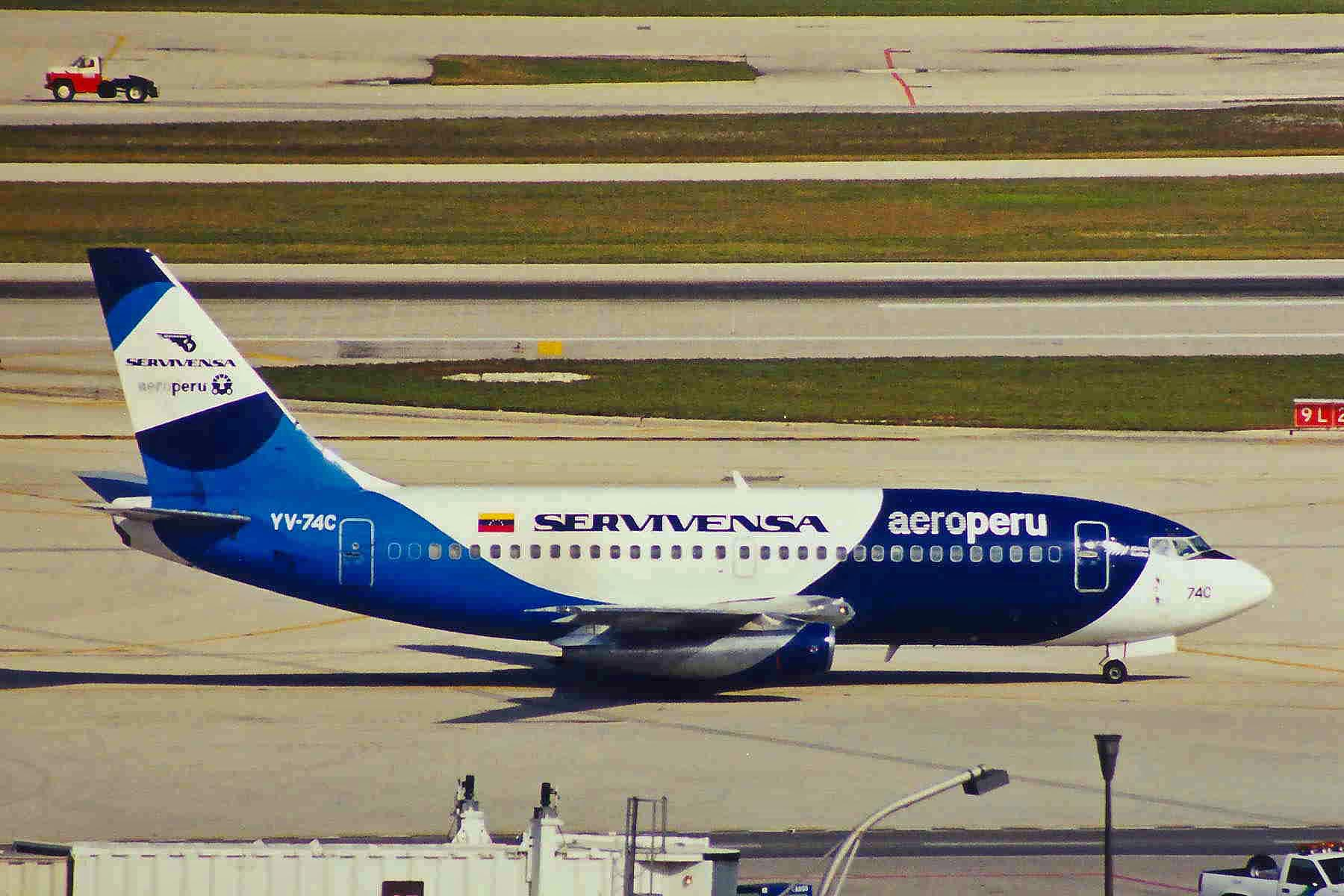
A Boeing 737-200 in the Alianza Andes livery at Miami International Airport in 1999

Servivensa operated the following aircraft:

- 4 Beechcraft 90
- 3 Boeing 727-100
- 7 Boeing 727-200
- 2 Boeing 737-200
- 1 Boeing 757-200
- 2 Douglas DC-3C
- 5 Douglas C-47A Skytrain
- 8 McDonnell Douglas DC-9-31
- 3 McDonnell Douglas DC-9-32
- 3 McDonnell Douglas DC-9-51

== Accidents and incidents ==
- On December 17, 1994, Douglas C-47A (registered YV-761-C) crashed on approach to Cerro Aicha Airport, killing all nine people on board.
- On October 2, 1998, Douglas DC-3C (registered YV-611C) crashed on approach to Canaima Airport. The aircraft had been on a local sightseeing flight to view the Angel Falls. One of the 25 people on board was killed.
- In 2000, U.S. federal prosecutors indicted 18 individuals for a drug trafficking conspiracy centered around using Servivensa flight attendants to smuggle heroin into the United States, following a year-long investigation known as Operation Aeromoza.

== See also ==
- List of defunct airlines of Venezuela
