= Flash Airlines =

Egyptian airline

IATA	ICAO	Call sign
—	FSH	FLASH
- Founded: 1995 (as Heliopolis Airlines)
- Ceased operations: March 2004
- Operating bases: Sharm el-Sheikh Int'l Airport
- Fleet size: 2
- Parent company: Flash Group
- Headquarters: Cairo, Egypt

Flash Airlines was a private charter airline operating out of Cairo, Egypt that was part of the Flash Group tourism company. The airline operated two Boeing 737-3Q8 aircraft manufactured in 1993 on non-scheduled commercial passenger flights on both international and domestic routes.

== History ==
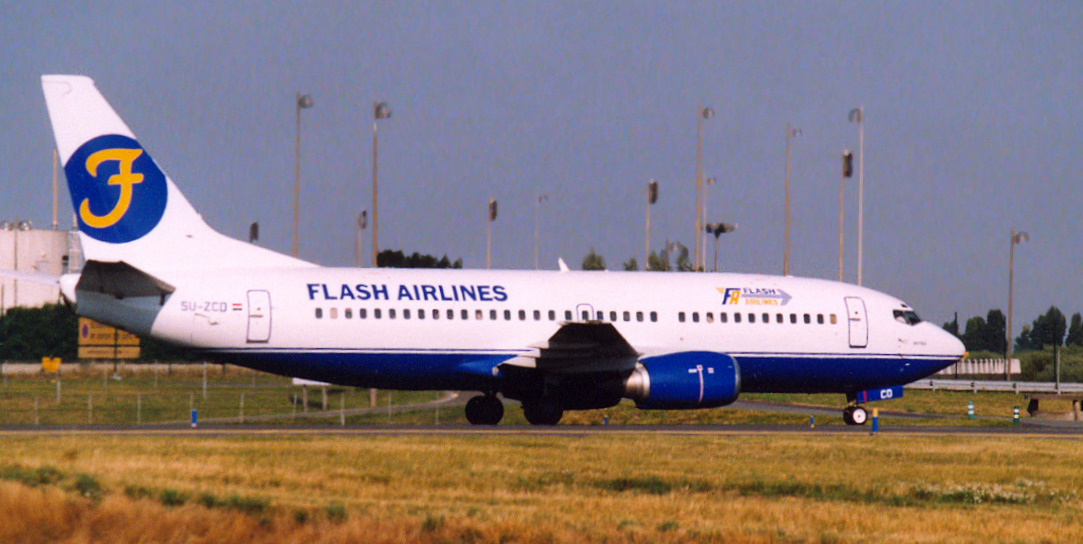
A Flash Airlines Boeing 737-300 at the Charles de Gaulle Airport in Paris (2003)

The airline was established in 1995 as Heliopolis Airlines. It received its certificate of operation from the Egyptian authorities in 1996. It became a member of the Flash group in 2000. During that year Flash Airlines had one 737-300 with another that joined in 2002.

In 2002, Swiss aviation authorities performed a surprise inspection on SU-ZCF, a Flash Airlines Boeing 737-300. They discovered missing pilot oxygen masks, a lack of oxygen tanks, and inoperable cockpit instruments. The Swiss grounded the aircraft until Flash repaired the plane. Several days later, Switzerland banned Flash. Poland also banned Flash, while tour operators in Norway ceased contracting. In early 2004, SU-ZCF crashed while operating Flash's Flight 604 from Sharm el-Sheikh to Paris via Cairo. The subsequent investigation exposed poor safety measures and pilot disorientation, which led to the demise of Flash.

== Fleet ==
=== Flash Airlines ===
The Flash Airlines fleet consisted of the following aircraft during operations:

Aircraft	Registration	Delivered	Exited	Fate
Boeing 737-3Q8	SU-ZCF	22 July 2001	3 January 2004	Crashed as Flash Airlines Flight 604
Boeing 737-3Q8	SU-ZCD	16 February 2002	5 March 2004	Became N271LF with ILFC

=== Heliopolis Airlines ===
The Heliopolis Airlines fleet consisted of the following aircraft before merging into Flash group:

Aircraft	Registration	Delivered	Exited	Fate
Airbus A310-222	SU-ZCC	27 October 1997	26 August 1999	Became N453FE with FedEx Express
Boeing 737-3Q8	SU-ZCE	21 April 2000	17 May 2000	Became N221LF with ILFC, later became SU-ZCF
Boeing 737-3Q8	SU-ZCF	23 June 2001	22 July 2001	Stayed as SU-ZCF with Flash Airlines
Boeing 737-3Q8	SU-ZCD	16 February 2000	27 August 2000	Stayed as SU-ZCD with Ecoair International
McDonnell Douglas MD-83	SU-ZCA	23 August 1996	13 February 1998	Became HK-4137X with Avianca, involved in the Air Algérie Flight 5017 crash

== Accidents and incidents ==
- On 3 January 2004, Flash Airlines Flight 604, operated by a Boeing 737-300 registration SU-ZCF, crashed into the Red Sea shortly after taking off from Sharm el-Sheikh. All passengers and crew died. As a result of the crash, Flash Airlines went out of business in March 2004.
