= Flash Airlines Flight 604 =

2004 aviation accident in the Red Sea

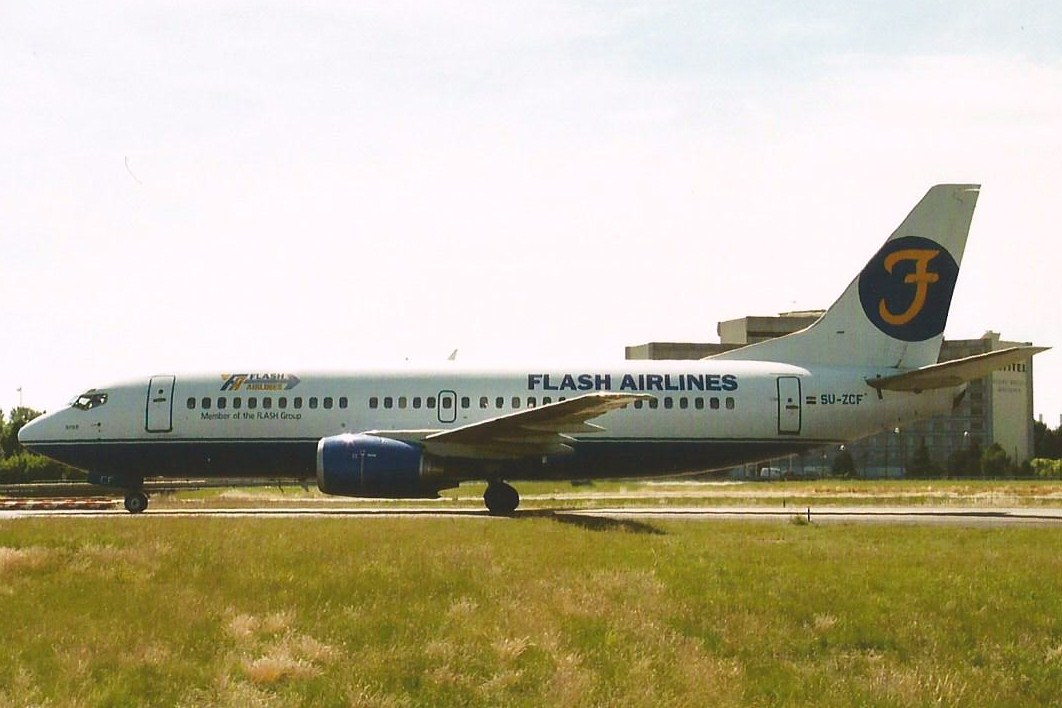
- SU-ZCF, the aircraft involved in the accident, pictured in 2003

Accident
- Date: 3 January 2004
- Summary: Crashed shortly after takeoff due to spatial disorientation
- Site: Red Sea near Sharm El Sheikh International Airport, Sharm El Sheikh, Egypt; 27°50′N 34°23′E

Aircraft
- Aircraft type: Boeing 737-3Q8
- Aircraft name: Nour
- Operator: Flash Airlines
- ICAO flight No.: FSH604
- Call sign: FLASH 604
- Registration: SU-ZCF
- Flight origin: Sharm El Sheikh International Airport, Sharm El Sheikh, Egypt
- Stopover: Cairo International Airport, Cairo, Egypt
- Destination: Charles de Gaulle Airport, Paris, France
- Occupants: 148
- Passengers: 135
- Crew: 13
- Fatalities: 148
- Survivors: 0

Flash Airlines Flight 604 was a charter flight from Sharm El Sheikh International Airport in Egypt to Charles de Gaulle International Airport in Paris, France, with a stop-over at Cairo International Airport, provided by Egyptian private charter company Flash Airlines. On 3 January 2004, the Boeing 737-300 that was operating the route crashed into the Red Sea shortly after takeoff from Sharm El Sheikh, killing all 135 passengers, most of whom were French tourists, and all thirteen crew members. The findings of the crash investigation were controversial, with accident investigators from the different countries involved unable to agree on the cause of the accident.

Flight 604 was the deadliest air disaster in Egypt until it was surpassed almost 12 years later by the bombing of Metrojet Flight 9268. It remains the deadliest accident involving a 737 Classic aircraft.

== Background ==
=== Aircraft ===
The aircraft involved, manufactured in October 1992, was an 11-year-old Boeing 737-3Q8 powered by two CFM International CFM56-3C1 engines. At the time of the accident, it had accumulated around 25,600 flight hours and 18,000 cycles of takeoffs and landings.

=== Crew ===
The captain of Flight 604 was 53-year-old Khedr Abdullah who had accrued almost 7,500 hours of flight time, including 474 hours on the Boeing 737. The first officer was 25-year-old Amr al-Shaafei who had fewer than 800 hours of flying experience, with 242 of them on the Boeing 737. Also in the cockpit was 42-year-old Ashraf Abdelhamid, who was training as a first officer and had experience flying corporate jets.

=== Passengers ===
Most of the passengers aboard the flight were French tourists from the Paris metropolitan area. A provisional passenger list, dated 5 January 2004, stated that twelve entire French families had boarded the flight. Members of only seventeen families appeared at Charles de Gaulle Airport to meet passengers off the flight; this gave an indication to the airport staff that entire families had died on Flight 604.

Country of origin	Passengers	Crew	Total
Egypt	0	13	13
France	132	0	132
Morocco	2	0	2
Japan	1	0	1
Total	135	13	148

== Accident ==
The aircraft departed from Sharm El Sheikh International Airport at 04:42 EGY (02:42 UTC) on 3 January 2004. After taking off, it made a left turn to intercept the airport's VOR system, and the autopilot was then engaged.

Shortly afterwards, however, Captain Khedr made an unintelligible exclamation and the autopilot abruptly disconnected (this might have been an intentional action by the pilots or it may have happened automatically). At this point the aircraft entered a right bank of 40 degrees. When the bank reached 50 degrees, First Officer al-Shaafei called out "overbank," indicating that the aircraft's bank was becoming dangerous. The bank angle increased rapidly until it reached 111 degrees at which point the aircraft entered a stall. It crashed into the Red Sea at 04:45 EGY (02:45 UTC), just three minutes after takeoff, at a speed of 412 knots (763 km/h; 474 mph) at a right bank angle of 24 degrees and at a nose-down angle of 24 degrees. All 148 people on board died in the crash.

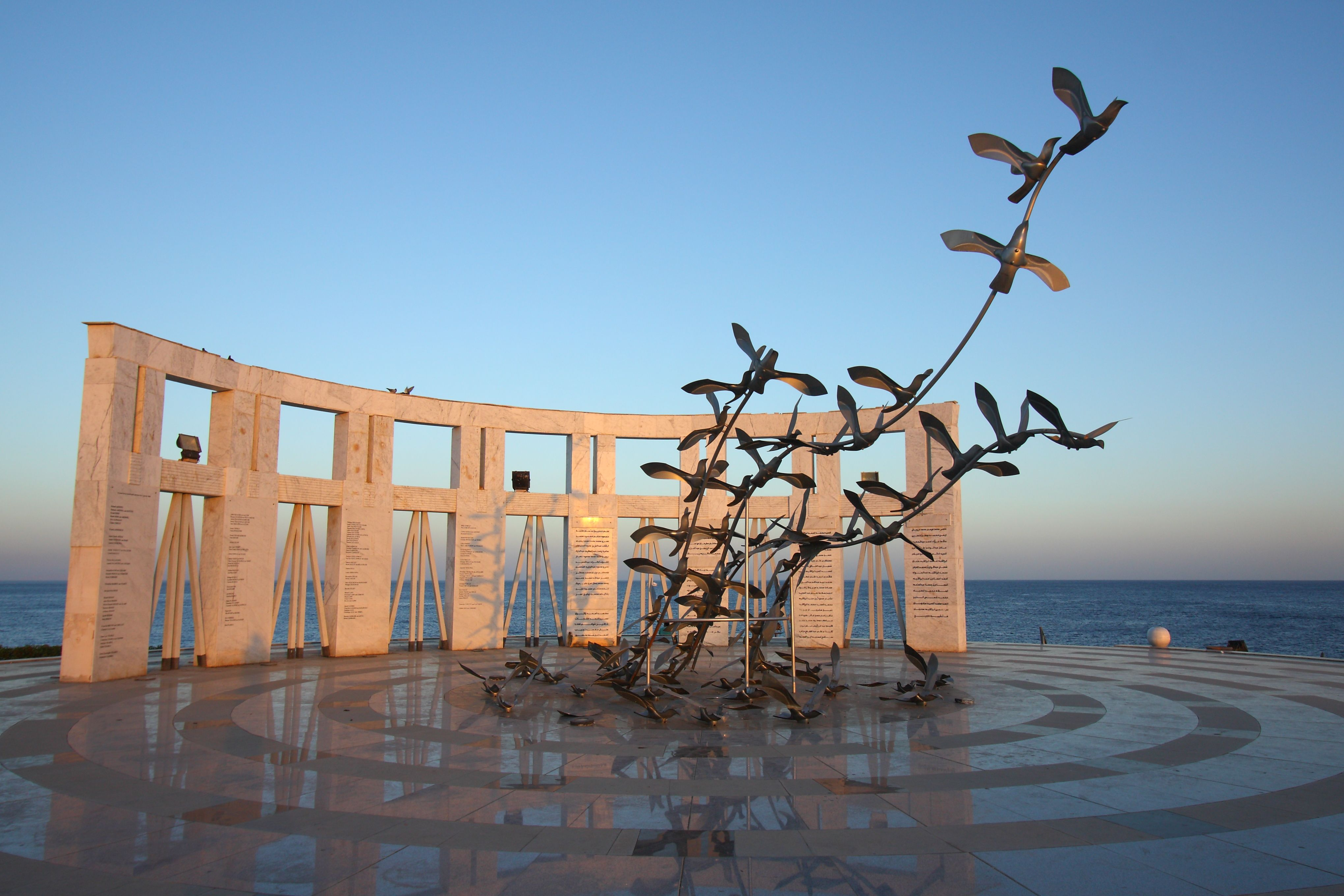
Monument built at Sharm El Sheikh to commemorate the crash victims

== Investigation ==
Initially, it was thought that terrorists might have been involved, as fear of aviation terrorism was high (with several major airlines in previous days cancelling flights on short notice). The British Prime Minister at the time, Tony Blair, was also on holiday in the Sharm El Sheikh area. A group in Yemen said that it destroyed the aircraft as retaliation against a new law in France banning headscarves in schools. Accident investigators dismissed terrorism when they discovered that the wreckage was in a tight debris field, indicating that the aircraft crashed in one piece; a bombed aircraft would have disintegrated and left a large debris field.

The wreckage sank to a depth of 1,000 m (3,300 ft), making recovery of the flight data recorder (FDR) and cockpit voice recorder (CVR) difficult. However two weeks after the accident, both devices were located by a French salvage vessel and recovered by a ROV. The accident investigators examined the recorders while in Cairo. The maintenance records of the aircraft had not been duplicated; they were destroyed in the crash and no backup copies existed.

The Egyptian Ministry of Civil Aviation (MCA) investigated the accident, with assistance from the American National Transportation Safety Board (NTSB) and the French Bureau of Enquiry and Analysis for Civil Aviation Safety (BEA).

The MCA released its final report into the accident on 25 March 2006. The report did not conclude with a probable cause, listing instead four "possible causes".

The NTSB and the BEA concluded that the pilot suffered spatial disorientation, and the copilot was unwilling to challenge his more experienced superior. Furthermore, the NTSB and BEA noted that both officers were insufficiently trained. According to the NTSB, the CVR showed that 24 seconds had passed after the airliner banked before the pilot began corrective maneuvers. Egyptian authorities disagreed with this assessment, instead blaming mechanical issues. Shaker Kelada, the lead Egyptian investigator, said that if Abdelhamid, who had more experience than the copilot, detected any problems with the flight, he would have raised objections. Some media reports suggest that the crash was caused by technical problems, possibly a result of the airline's apparently questionable safety record. This attitude was shown in a press briefing given by the BEA chief, who was berated by the first officer's mother during a press conference and demanded that the crew be absolved of fault prior to the completion of the investigation. Two months after the crash, Flash Airlines declared bankruptcy.

According to an excerpt from page five of the U.S.'s comments on the final report of this accident:

"Distraction. A few seconds before the captain called for the autopilot to be engaged, the aircraft's pitch began increasing and airspeed began decreasing. These deviations continued during and after the autopilot engagement/disengagement sequence. The captain ultimately allowed the airspeed to decrease to 35 knots (65 km/h; 40 mph) below his commanded target airspeed of 220 knots (410 km/h; 250 mph) and the climb pitch to reach 22°, which is 10° more than the standard climb pitch of about 12°. During this time, the captain also allowed the aircraft to enter a gradually steepening right bank, which was inconsistent with the flight crew's departure clearance to perform a climbing left turn. These pitch, airspeed and bank angle deviations indicated that the captain directed his attention away from monitoring the attitude indications during and after the autopilot disengagement process. Changes in the autoflight system's mode status offer the best explanation for the captain's distraction. The following changes occurred in the autoflight system's mode status shortly before the initiation of the right roll: (1) manual engagement of the autopilot, (2) automatic transition of roll guidance from heading select to control wheel steering-roll (CWS-R), (3) manual disengagement of the autopilot, and (4) manual reengagement of heading select for roll guidance. The transition to the CWS-R mode occurred in accordance with nominal system operation because the captain was not closely following the flight director guidance at the time of the autopilot engagement. The captain might not have expected the transition, and he might not have understood why it occurred. The captain was probably referring to the mode change from command mode to CWS-R when he stated, "see what the aircraft did?," shortly after it occurred. The available evidence indicates that the unexpected mode change and the flight crew's subsequent focus of attention on reestablishing roll guidance for the autoflight system were the most likely reasons for the captain's distraction from monitoring the attitude."

Problems associated with the complexity of autopilot systems were documented in the June 2008 issue of Aero Safety World. Before the completion of the investigation, Avionics writer David Evans suggested that differences in artificial horizon instrumentation between the MiG-21 (with which the captain had experience) and the Boeing 737 may have contributed to the crash.

== In popular culture ==
The Discovery Channel Canada / National Geographic TV series Mayday (also called Air Crash Investigation, Air Emergency or Air Disasters) depicted the accident in a 2007 episode, Season 4 episode 9, titled "Vertigo".

== See also ==
- Gulf Air Flight 072
- Pan Am Flight 816
- Adam Air Flight 574
- Air India Flight 855
- Viasa Flight 897
- EgyptAir Flight 804
- Lion Air Flight 610
- Sriwijaya Air Flight 182
- John F. Kennedy Jr. plane crash
- The Day the Music Died
