= Pan Am Flight 816 =

1973 aviation accident

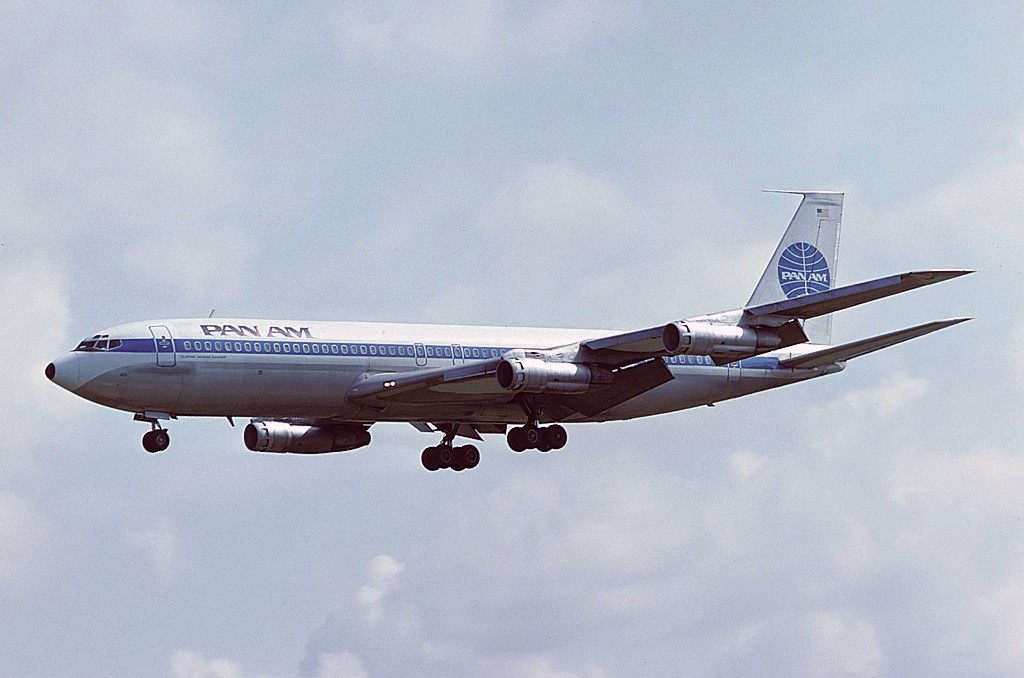
- Sister ship to the accident aircraft, Clipper Yankee Ranger (N418PA)

Accident
- Date: July 22, 1973
- Summary: Crashed during takeoff; cause undetermined
- Site: Off Faa'a International Airport, Papeete, Tahiti, French Polynesia; 17°30′56″S 149°35′10″W

Aircraft
- Aircraft type: Boeing 707-321B
- Aircraft name: Clipper Winged Racer
- Operator: Pan American World Airways
- Call sign: CLIPPER 816
- Registration: N417PA
- Flight origin: Auckland Airport, New Zealand
- 1st stopover: Faa'a International Airport, Tahiti, French Polynesia
- 2nd stopover: Los Angeles International Airport, California, United States
- Destination: San Francisco International Airport, California, United States
- Occupants: 79
- Passengers: 69
- Crew: 10
- Fatalities: 78
- Survivors: 1

Pan Am Flight 816 was an international flight from Auckland, New Zealand, to San Francisco, California, via Tahiti, French Polynesia, and Los Angeles, California. It was operated by a Pan Am Boeing 707 bearing the registration N417PA and named Clipper Winged Racer. On July 22, 1973, at 10:06 P.M. local time, the Boeing 707 took off from Faa'a International Airport in Papeete. Thirty seconds after takeoff, the airliner, carrying 79 passengers and crew, crashed into the sea. All occupants except 1 passenger were killed.

== Aircraft and crew ==
N417PA had its maiden flight on February 25, 1966, and was delivered to Pan Am on May 21. It was powered by four Pratt & Whitney JT3D-3B turbofan engines.

The captain was Robert M. Evarts of Grass Valley, California, 59, who had 25,275 flight hours, including 8,384 hours on the Boeing 707. Evarts's first officer was Lyle C. Havens, 59, from Medford, Oregon, who had 21,575 flight hours, with 9,248 of them on the Boeing 707. The flight engineer was Isaac N. Lambert, 34, of Danville, California (9,134 flight hours, 4,760 of which were on the Boeing 707). The navigator was Frederick W. Fischer, 32, of Rochester, New York. He had 3,961 flight hours, including 3,945 of them on the Boeing 707.

== Preceding events ==
The first leg of the flight from Auckland to Papeete was mainly uneventful. However, after landing, the flight crew reported a crack in the cockpit windshield. Procedures (at the time) considered this a minor problem and allowed pilots to continue flying. Nevertheless, the crew notified airline officials in New York City about the issue and requested permission to continue the flight, which was granted. Captain Evarts decided to have the aircraft loaded with additional fuel, expecting a lower flight altitude than usual. 156,220 pounds (70,860 kg) of fuel were loaded instead of the planned 121,000 pounds (55,000 kg).

The communication with New York City and the extra refueling delayed the flight past its intended departure time of 20:30 by 90 minutes. The aircraft weighed 316,150 pounds (143,400 kg) from the extra fuel. The engines burned 1,000 pounds (450 kg) of fuel before takeoff, decreasing the aircraft's weight to 315,150 pounds (142,950 kg). The weather consisted of rain (with stratus and cumulonimbus clouds at 7,900 feet (2,400 m) and 980–1,640 feet (300–500 m), respectively), wind blowing from the Southwest, a visibility of 8 kilometres (5.0 mi; 4.3 nmi), atmospheric pressure of 1013 mb and an outside air temperature of 26 °C (79 °F). The aircraft would take off from the 11,201-foot (3,414 m) runway 08. The V speeds were the following:

- V1 = 143 knots (265 km/h; 165 mph)
- VR = 149 knots (276 km/h; 171 mph)
- V2 = 165 knots (306 km/h; 190 mph)

== Accident description ==
At 9:52 PM the crew contacted air traffic control requesting permission to take off from runway 04 instead of 08. Two minutes later, Flight 816 began taxiing. The crew then asked if they could be assigned flight level (FL) 230 (23,000 feet (7,000 m)) as their cruising altitude, rather than the intended FL 330 (33,000 feet (10,000 m). At 10:04 PM the controller cleared Flight 816 for takeoff, but the crew did not acknowledge this transmission.

Eyewitnesses reported seeing the aircraft make a sudden 90-degree turn soon after takeoff, along with a flash from the aircraft. The sole survivor reported a loud cracking sound immediately before the crash. At 10:06 PM, the controller heard a loud sound over the radio, saw flashes on the water, and activated the emergency response. A sea search by naval ships and private craft recovered 12 bodies and one survivor. The sole survivor of the accident was a Canadian citizen. He told investigators that he felt the aircraft was in a dive, took the brace position, and "woke up" in the water. The crash of Flight 816 is the deadliest aviation disaster to occur in French Polynesia.

== Investigation ==
By 31 July, M. Lemaire, president of the French commission of inquiry, declared that it was unlikely that a criminal act had taken place.

The cockpit voice recorder and flight data recorder are believed to have sunk in 2,300 ft (700 m) of water, and were never recovered. It is believed that an instrument failure during the climb out turn may have contributed to the accident.

Due to the flight recorders not being found, no official cause was determined.

== See also ==
- List of aviation accidents and incidents with a sole survivor
- Other aircraft that crashed shortly after takeoff after pilots lost spatial orientation:
  - Air India Flight 855
  - Flash Airlines Flight 604
  - Northeast Airlines Flight 823
  - South African Airways Flight 228
  - Viasa Flight 897
