= Viasa Flight 897 =

1961 plane crash off the coast of Portugal

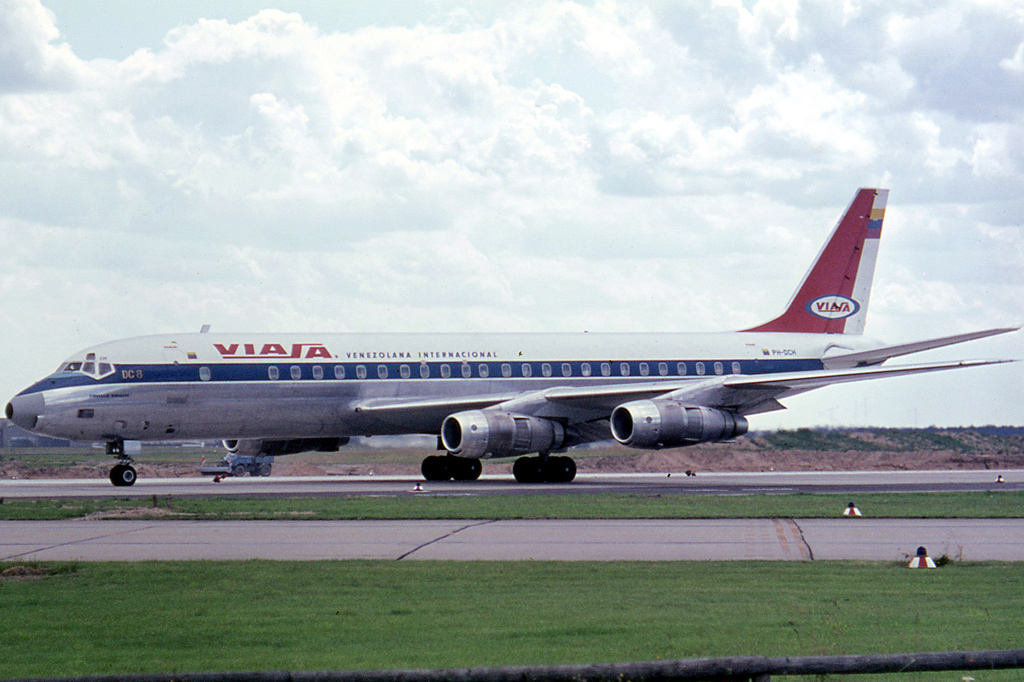
- A VIASA Douglas DC-8-53 similar to the one involved in the accident.

Accident
- Date: 30 May 1961
- Summary: Loss of control, cause undetermined
- Site: Off the coast of Lisbon, Portugal

Aircraft
- Aircraft type: Douglas DC-8-53
- Aircraft name: Fridtjof Nansen
- Operator: KLM on behalf of Viasa
- Call sign: VIASA 897
- Registration: PH-DCL
- Flight origin: Fiumicino Airport
- 1st stopover: Barajas Airport
- 2nd stopover: Portela Airport
- 3rd stopover: Santa Maria Airport
- Last stopover: Portela Airport
- Destination: Simón Bolívar International Airport
- Occupants: 61
- Passengers: 47
- Crew: 14
- Fatalities: 61
- Survivors: 0

Viasa Flight 897 was an international scheduled Rome–Madrid–Lisbon–Santa Maria–Caracas (Note: There exists a discrepancy over the route served by the flight depending upon the source. Nevertheless, a July 1961 timetable shows that the route covered by the flight at the time the accident took place actually had its origin in Rome and had Caracas as its final destination, with stopovers at Madrid, Lisbon, and Santa Maria Island.) passenger service that crashed into the Atlantic Ocean off the coast of Portugal on 30 May 1961, shortly after takeoff from Portela Airport. There were no survivors among the 61 occupants of the Douglas DC-8-53.

== Aircraft ==
Named Fridtjof Nansen, the aircraft involved in the accident was a Douglas DC-8-53, registration PH-DCL, owned by KLM and operated on Viasa's behalf. With constructor's number 45615/131, the airframe was the newest one of the type in KLM's fleet at the time the accident took place; it had accumulated 209 flight hours.

== Description ==
The crash of Viasa Flight 897 occurred on the third leg of a trip that originated in Rome, Italy, and was scheduled to conclude in Caracas, Venezuela. Intermediate stops were to be made in Madrid, Spain, Lisbon, and on Santa Maria Island.

At the time the airliner lifted off from Lisbon at 01:15 UTC, the nighttime sky had a cloud base of 3,700 feet (1,100 m). A few minutes after takeoff the DC-8 entered a spiral dive to the left shortly after sending two short messages to Air Traffic Control. The pilot over-corrected to the right and the aircraft struck the sea with a pitch angle of approximately 25° nose down.

== Investigation ==
The cause for the crash of Viasa Flight 897 was never determined by either Portuguese or Dutch authorities. The official report out of Portugal concluded "Notwithstanding a very thorough, time-consuming investigation, in which many authorities and experts co-operated, it was not possible to establish a probable cause of the accident."

The Netherlands, as state of registry for the aircraft, commented: "Though there are no direct indications in this respect, the Board regards it as possible that the accident was due to the pilot or pilots being misled by instrument failure, in particular of the artificial horizon, or to the pilot having been distracted, so that a serious deviation from the normal flight path was not discovered in time."

== Legacy ==
At the time it occurred, Flight 897 was the third fatal crash of a big jetliner since they were introduced into service in 1958. It was the worst civilian aviation incident ever to take place in Portugal until the crash of TAP Air Portugal Flight 425 in 1977.

== See also ==
- Graveyard spiral
- Sensory illusions in aviation
- Spatial disorientation
- Other aircraft that crashed shortly after takeoff, while turning above a dark ocean:
  - Air India Flight 855
  - Flash Airlines Flight 604
  - Pan Am Flight 816
