= Jacinto Lara International Airport =

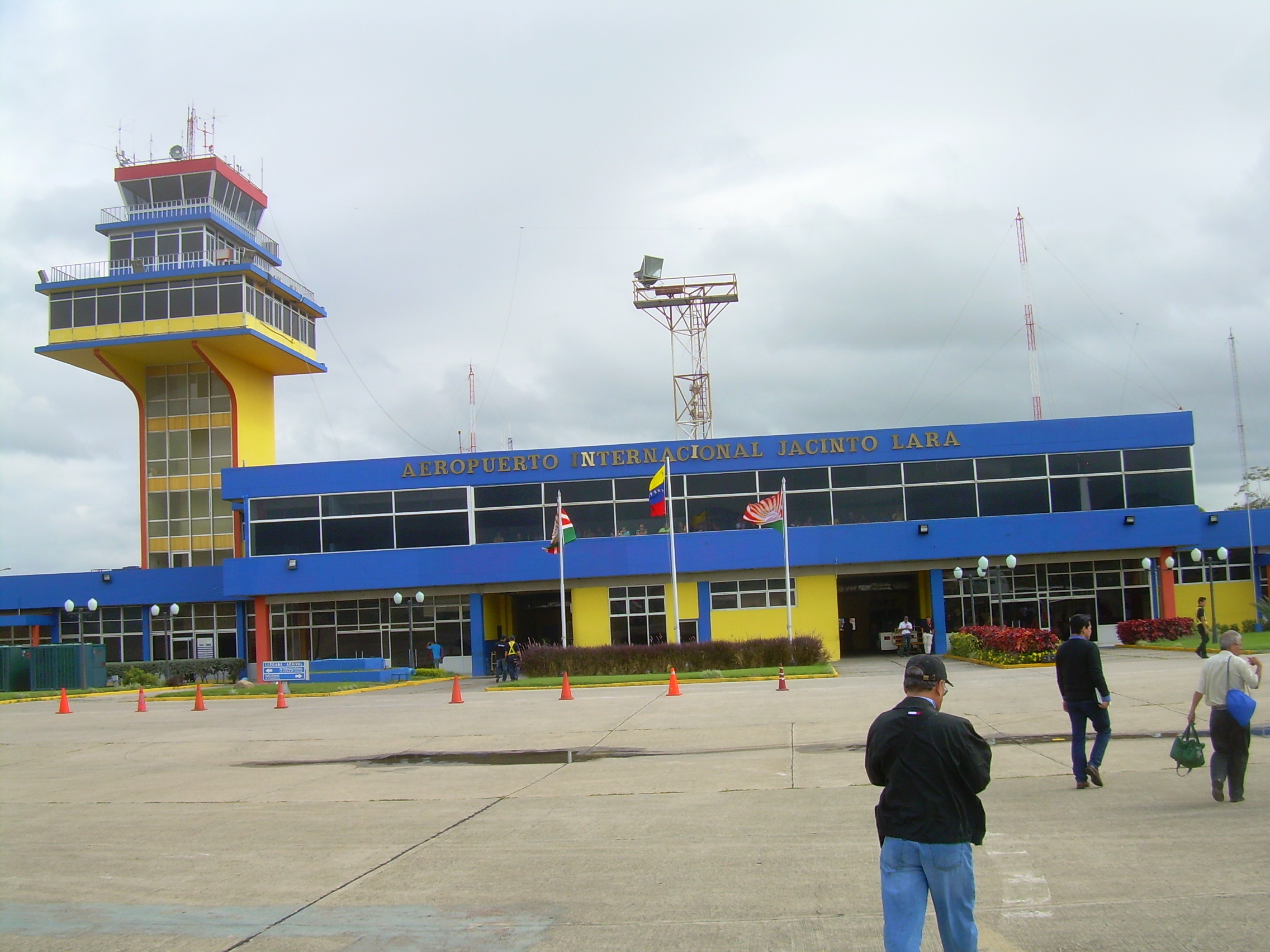
- IATA: BRM; ICAO: SVBM

Summary
- Airport type: General
- Operator: IADAL
- Location: Barquisimeto, Venezuela
- Elevation AMSL: 2,042 ft (622 m)
- Coordinates: 10°02′34″N 069°21′30″W
- Website: http://iadal.lara.gob.ve/

Map
- Location of the airport in Venezuela

Runways
Direction	Length		Surface
Direction	m	ft	Surface
09/27	2,850	9,350	Asphalt
- Sources: GCM

Jacinto Lara International Airport (IATA: BRM, ICAO: SVBM) is an airport in Barquisimeto, Venezuela, named after Venezuelan independence hero Jacinto Lara. It serves the city of Barquisimeto and others such as Acarigua, Yaritagua, and Carora, the main cities in the west-central area of Venezuela.

It is one of the most important airports of Venezuela, with domestic flights to Caracas and international flights to Caribbean islands such as Hispaniola (to the Dominican Republic) and, formerly, to Curaçao, Aruba, and the United States. The airport was inaugurated in 1961 by Rómulo Betancourt; it has one terminal building.

== Airlines and destinations ==
Airlines	Destinations
Air Century	Punta Cana, Santo Domingo
Avior Airlines	Caracas
Conviasa	Caracas, Porlamar, San Antonio del Táchira
Copa Airlines	Panama City–Tocumen
RUTACA Airlines	Caracas, Panama City–Tocumen, Porlamar, San Antonio del Táchira
Venezolana	Caracas

== See also ==
- Transport in Venezuela
- List of airports in Venezuela
