= Aerovías Quisqueyana =

Dominican airline

IATA	ICAO	Call sign
QQ	QAS	—
- Founded: 1962
- Ceased operations: 1978 (end of flight operations); 1993 (formally dissolved)
- Hubs: Las Américas International Airport
- Headquarters: Santo Domingo, Dominican Republic

Aerovías Nacionales Quisqueyana, also known as Quisqueyana, was an airline from the Dominican Republic which was based at Las Américas International Airport, Santo Domingo, during the 1960s and 1970s. Offering mostly flights to the United States and to Europe, Quisqueyana was in direct competition with Dominicana, which at the time was the flag carrier of the country.

== History ==
Quisqueyana was founded in 1962, aiming at the Dominican VFR traffic within the Americas and to Europe. It became the second largest airline of the Dominican Republic, but ultimately lost the competition with Dominicana. In 1978, the airline suspended all flights and was shut down, though technically its airline license stayed valid until 1993.

== Destinations ==
In 1976, Quisqueyana offered scheduled flights to the following destinations:

Dominican Republic

- Santo Domingo - Las Américas International Airport hub

Italy

- Rome - Leonardo da Vinci-Fiumicino Airport

Puerto Rico

- San Juan - Luis Muñoz Marín International Airport

Spain

- Madrid - Barajas International Airport

United States of America

- Miami - Miami International Airport

== Fleet ==
Over the years of its existence, Quisqueyana operated the following aircraft types:

- Boeing 707
- Boeing 727
- Convair 880
- Curtiss-Wright C-46 Commando
- Douglas DC-3
- Douglas DC-8
- Lockheed Constellation (last airline in the world to use this type for passenger flights)
- Martin 4-0-4

== Incidents ==
- On 26 January 1971, a hijacking attempt occurred on board a Quisqueyana Lockheed Constellation. A person demanded to be taken to Cuba, but was quickly overpowered by passengers.
- On 31 August 1979, a Quisqueyana Constellation (registered HI-260) was destroyed during Hurricane David. The abandoned aircraft had been parked at Las Américas International Airport, Santo Domingo following the demise of the airline.
