= Dominicana de Aviación =

Flag carrier of the Dominican Republic (1944–1995)

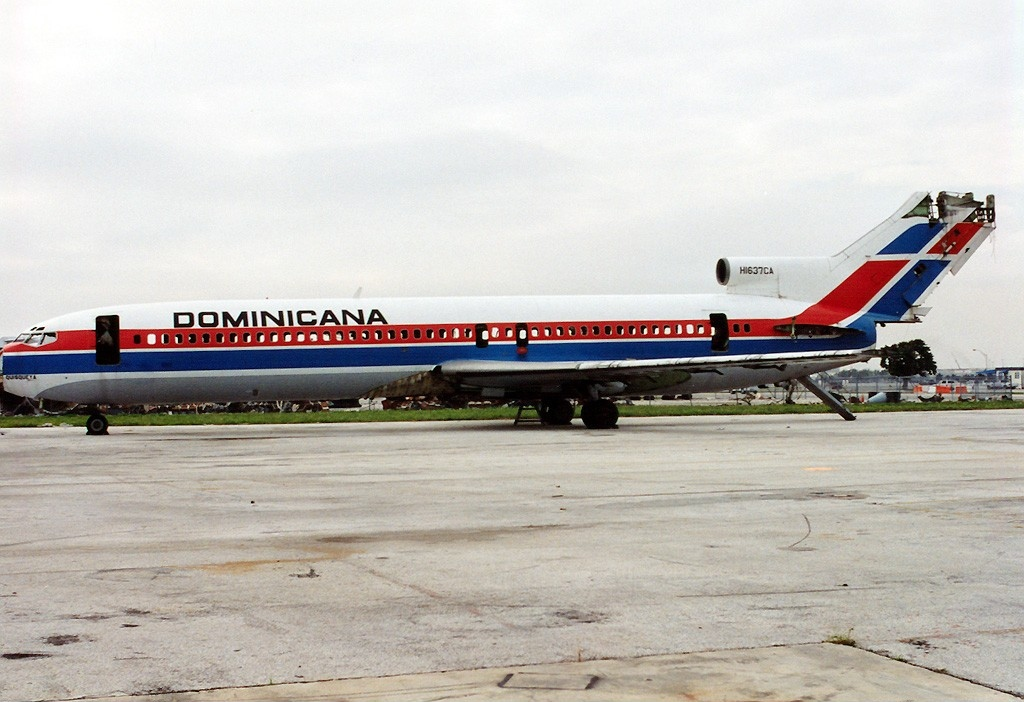
- A 727-200 of Dominicana being scrapped in 1994
IATA	ICAO	Call sign
DO	DOA	DOMINICANA
- Founded: 4 May 1944
- Commenced operations: 1944
- Ceased operations: 1995
- Hubs: Santo Domingo–Las Américas
- Secondary hubs: Puerto Plata
- Focus cities: Miami; New York-JFK; San Juan
- Fleet size: 13
- Destinations: 19 (at time of closing)
- Headquarters: Santo Domingo, Dominican Republic
- Employees: 45,000

Compañía Dominicana de Aviación, usually shortened to Dominicana, was an airline based in the Dominican Republic and served as the first flag carrier for the country.

== History ==
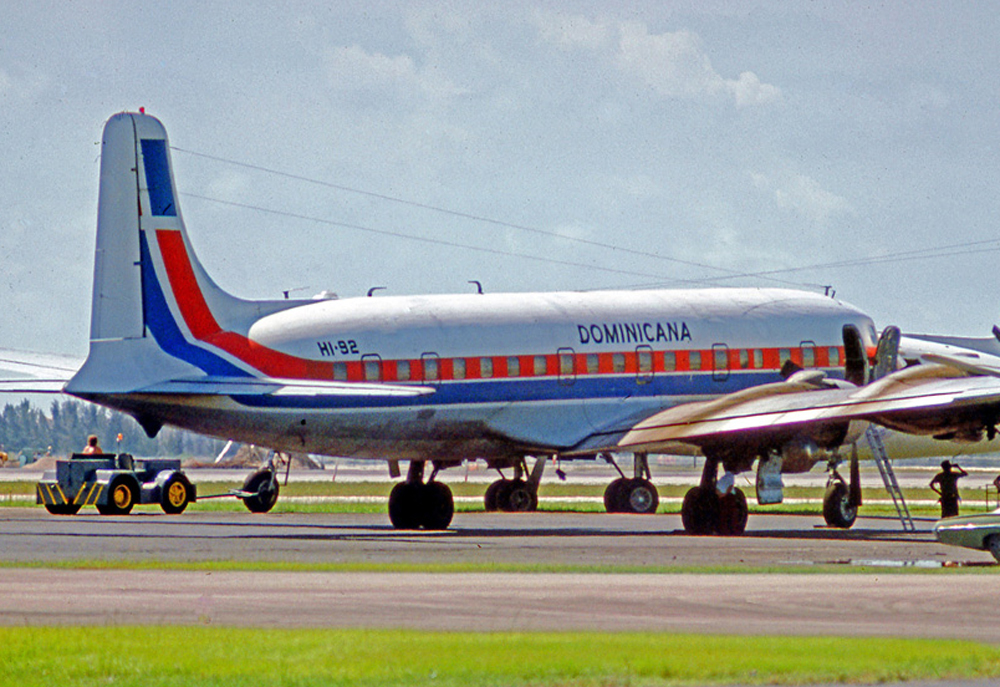
A Dominicana Douglas DC-6B freighter parked at Miami International Airport in 1975

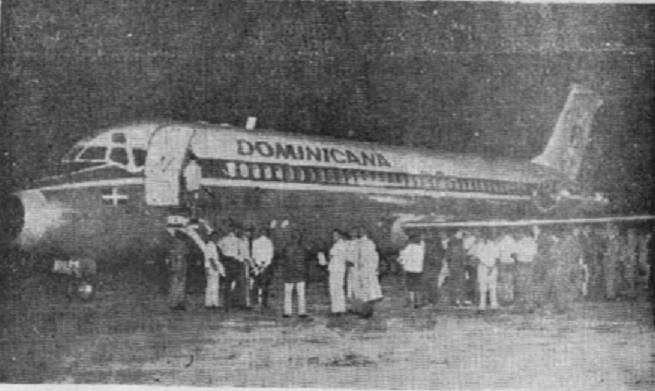
The only McDonnell Douglas DC-9 Dominicana owned. This aircraft crashed in 1970, killing all 102 people on board

Dominicana was established in 1944 in an effort to create a national airline aiming at the large number of Dominican citizens who emigrated to the United States, Puerto Rico and Spain. The initial fleet consisted of the Douglas C-47 and DC-6. During the 1950s, Dominicana launched a domestic route network to places such as Puerto Plata, La Romana and Santiago de los Caballeros, acquiring Curtiss C-46 Commando and Aviation Traders Carvair airplanes. In 1960, the airline was operating international nonstop passenger service between Ciudad Trujillo (the capital of the Dominican Republic which was later renamed Santo Domingo) and Miami with Douglas DC-4 propliners and also nonstop between Ciudad Trujillo and San Juan, Puerto Rico with Douglas DC-3 and Curtiss C-46 prop aircraft. Later during the 1960s, Dominicana renewed its fleet with the Douglas DC-8, McDonnell Douglas DC-9 and Boeing 727 jetliners. The route network was further expanded, with more destinations in the Americas and the Caribbean during the 1970s. At its height in the 1980s, Dominicana operated the Boeing 747 to European destinations like Madrid, Milan, and Frankfurt.

At the end of the decade, the airline's economic situation worsened due to poor management, lack of innovation or cost-cutting culture, and the heavy maintenance costs of its aging fleet. More importantly, on the revenue side, government employees also sought to fly non-revenue, given the typical patronage in the Dominican Republic with many flights full of them often displacing paying passengers. Subsequently, the fleet and network were scaled back, leaving only the original routes like New York, Miami, Caracas, and San Juan. In an effort to save on maintenance costs, Dominicana began to operate leased aircraft (mostly Boeing 727s and also Airbus A300s). The financial situation further worsened into the 1990s, which coincided with a negative customer reputation (like lost or delayed luggage as well as unreliable schedules). In 1994, now also faced with Cat1 restrictions in the US, Dominicana wet-leased a Boeing 737-300 and a Boeing 757-200 from Mexican low-cost airline TAESA. Further aircraft were wet-leased from Capitol Air Express Express One International, Atlantic Aviation and Carnival Air Lines. During Christmas of 1994, many Dominicana VFR passengers were stranded at JFK, MIA, and SJU when the airline was unable to provide necessary funding to lessors for heavily-booked Christmas flights (and, overbooked for the B727 the lessors were providing, since an A300 had been expected to be wet-leased). As a consequence of the outrage, in early 1995 the government of the Dominican Republic decided to shut down the airline. While the shutdown was originally only planned as a temporary measure to get re-organized, the company never became operational again, and was dissolved in 1999. The vice president at the time was quoted saying that "Dominicans can fly APA International" which was another "local" airline that benefited handsomely from Dominicana's demise. While several attempts have been made to privatize the airline, no efforts came to fruition. American Airlines and later JetBlue dominated the market and the business case for a new Dominican flag carrier is relatively weak given the investment that would be required and the debts that would have to be honored in order to use the Dominicana name.

== Destinations ==
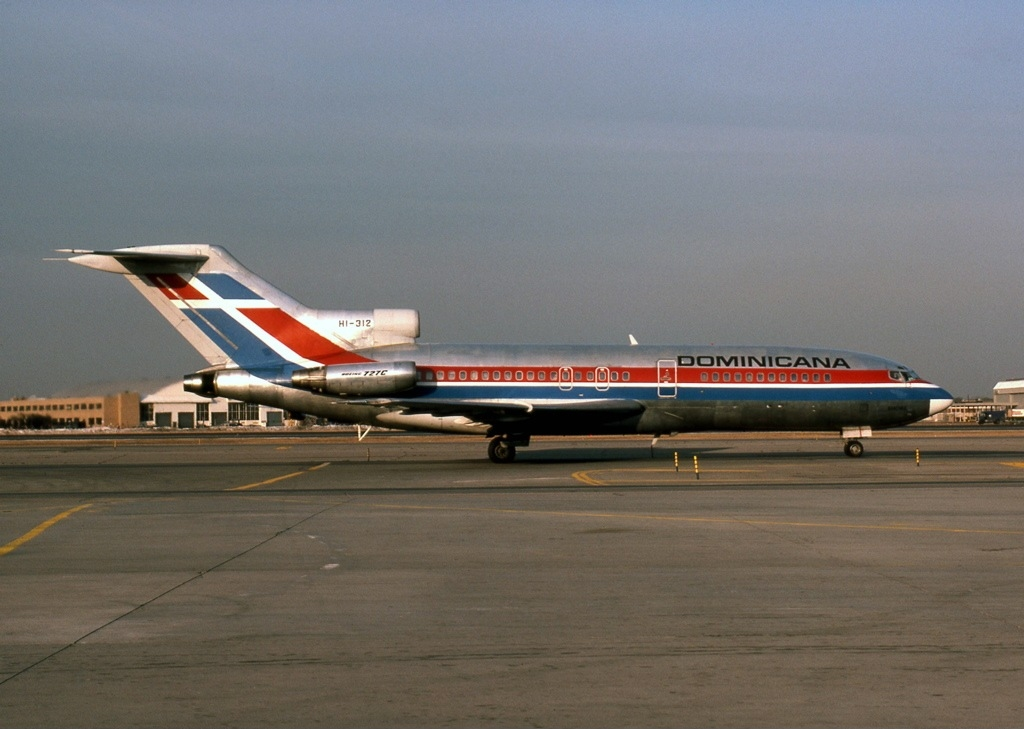
A Dominicana Boeing 727-100 taxiing at John F. Kennedy International Airport in 1985

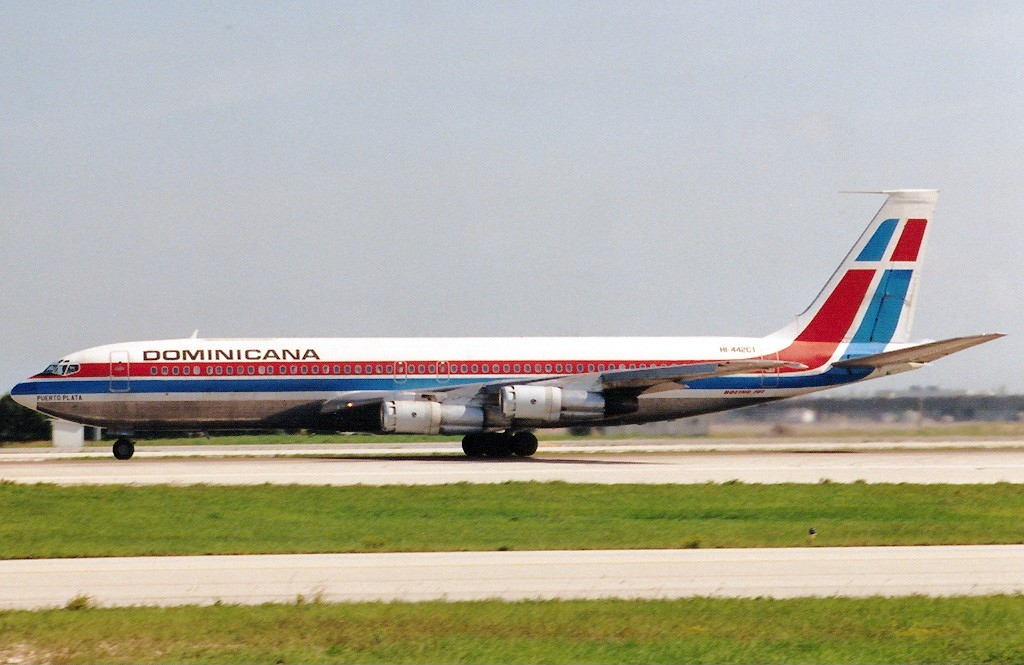
A Dominicana Boeing 707-320C at Miami International Airport in 1989

Aruba

- Oranjestad (Queen Beatrix International Airport)

Canada

- Toronto (Toronto Pearson International Airport)

Curaçao

- Willemstad (Curaçao International Airport)

Dominican Republic

- Barahona (María Montez International Airport)
- Puerto Plata (Gregorio Luperón International Airport) Hub
- Santo Domingo (Las Américas International Airport) Hub
- Santiago de los Caballeros

Ecuador

- Quito (Old Mariscal Sucre International Airport)

France

- Paris (Charles de Gaulle Airport)

Germany

- Frankfurt (Frankfurt Airport)

Haiti

- Port-au-Prince (Toussaint Louverture International Airport)

Italy

- Milán (Milan Malpensa Airport)

Panama

- Panama City (Tocumen International Airport)

Puerto Rico

- San Juan (Luis Muñoz Marín International Airport) Focus city

Spain

- Madrid (Adolfo Suárez Madrid–Barajas Airport)

United Kingdom

- London (Gatwick Airport)

United States

- Boston (Logan International Airport)
- Miami (Miami International Airport) Focus city
- New York City (John F. Kennedy International Airport) Focus city
- Orlando (Orlando International Airport)

Venezuela

- Caracas (Simón Bolívar International Airport)

== Fleet ==
Over the years, Dominicana operated the following aircraft types:

Dominicana de Aviación fleet
Aircraft	Total	Introduced	Retired	Notes
Airbus A300B4	2	1992	1993	Leased from Conair of Scandinavia
ATL-98A	2	1969	1978	One written off as Flight 401
Boeing 707-320	1	1971	1972	Leased from Pan Am
Boeing 707-320C	1	1972	1972	Leased from Pan Am
Boeing 707-320C	1	1984	1994	
Boeing 727-100	5	1972	1994	
Boeing 727-200	9	1975	1999	
Boeing 737-400	1	1994	Unknown	Wet leased from TAESA
Boeing 747-100	1	1985	1987	
Boeing 757-200	1	1994	Unknown	Wet leased from TAESA
Curtiss C-46 Commando	8	1948	1969	
Douglas C-47 Skytrain	4	1947	1974	Version of the Douglas DC-3
Douglas C-54 Skymaster	2	1958	1977	
Douglas DC-4	1	1973	1975	
Douglas DC-6B	4	1962	1994	
Douglas DC-8-43	2	1978	1981	
Lockheed L-188C Electra	1	1970	1971	Leased from American Flyers Airline
McDonnell Douglas DC-9-15	1	1968	1970	Leased from McDonnell Douglas
McDonnell Douglas DC-9-32	1	1969	1970	Crashed into the sea
McDonnell Douglas DC-10-10	1	1984	1985	Leased from Arrow Air
McDonnell Douglas DC-10-30	1	1995	1996	Leased from TAESA
McDonnell Douglas DC-10-40	1	1984	1984	Leased from Jet 24

=== Livery ===
The most common Dominicana livery consisted of a metallic silver fuselage, with red and blue cheatlines going all the way from the cockpit to the tail painting, representing the colors in the Dominican flag. The Dominicana titles were written in black letters above the passenger windows.

== Accidents and incidents ==
- On 11 January 1948, a Dominicana Douglas C-47 Skytrain (registered HI-6) crashed into a mountain near Yamasá in bad weather conditions, killing all 30 passengers and two crew members on board, amongst them the baseball team of B.B.C Santiago. The aircraft had been on a scheduled flight from Barahona to Santiago de los Caballeros.
- On 17 July 1958 at 10:16 UTC, a Curtiss C-46 Commando aircraft (registered HI-16) operating Dominicana Flight 402 from Ciudad Trujillo (today's Santo Domingo) to Miami crashed shortly after take-off due to an engine problem, killing the two pilots on board.
- On 23 June 1969 at 15:42 local time, a Dominicana Aviation Traders Carvair aircraft (registered HI-168), which was operating Flight 401 from Miami to Santo Domingo, crashed shortly after take-off from Miami International Airport, killing all four persons on board, as well as six people on the ground. The aircraft had suffered an engine failure during take-off run, on which the pilots were not able to react accordingly.
- On 15 February 1970 at approximately 18:30 local time, a Dominicana McDonnell Douglas DC-9 (registered HI-177) operating as Flight 603 crashed into the sea some 3 kilometres off Santo Domingo, killing all 97 passengers and 5 crew members on board, making it the deadliest accident in the history of the Dominican Republic until the crash of Birgenair Flight 301 in 1996. The aircraft had just departed Las Américas International Airport for a scheduled flight to San Juan, when it suffered a dual engine failure.
- On 5 September 1993, a Dominicana Boeing 727-200 (registered HI-617CA) was destroyed in a fire at Las Américas Airport. The then 20 years old aircraft had been operating a scheduled flight from San Juan to Santo Domingo carrying 98 passengers and 7 crew members, when the cabin filled with smoke during disembarkation, which was caused by a fire due to electrical overheating. All people involved managed to leave the aircraft before it was completely engulfed by the flames.

== See also ==
- List of defunct airlines of the Dominican Republic
