= Dominicana de Aviación Flight 603 =

1970 aviation accident in the Caribbean Sea

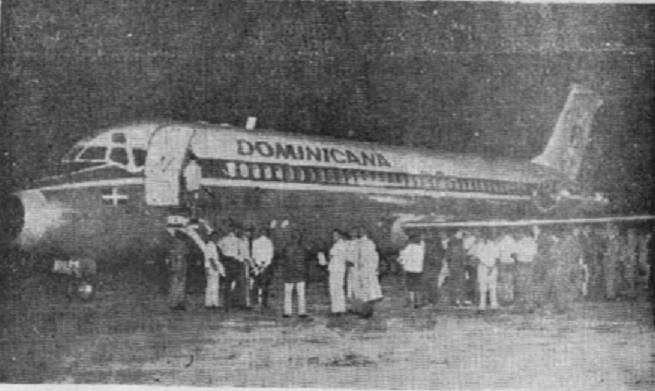
- HI-177, the aircraft involved in the accident

Accident
- Date: February 15, 1970
- Summary: Dual-engine failure due to fuel contamination
- Site: 18.388086°N 69.678913°W Caribbean Sea, near Las Américas International Airport, Santo Domingo, Dominican Republic

Aircraft
- Aircraft type: McDonnell Douglas DC-9-32
- Operator: Dominicana de Aviación
- IATA flight No.: DO603
- ICAO flight No.: DOA603
- Call sign: DOMINICANA 603
- Registration: HI-177
- Flight origin: Las Américas International Airport, Santo Domingo, Dominican Republic
- Destination: Luis Muñoz Marín International Airport, San Juan, Puerto Rico
- Occupants: 102
- Passengers: 97
- Crew: 5
- Fatalities: 102
- Survivors: 0

On February 15, 1970, Dominicana de Aviación Flight 603, (Note: Spanish: Vuelo 603 de Dominicana de Aviación) en route from Santo Domingo, Dominican Republic to San Juan, Puerto Rico crashed into the Caribbean Sea shortly after takeoff. The crash killed all 97 passengers and 5 crew on board, making it the deadliest aviation disaster to occur within the Dominican Republic until the crash of Birgenair Flight 301 in 1996, in the Caribbean Sea, leaving 189 dead.

== Aircraft ==
The aircraft, a McDonnell Douglas DC-9-32 registered as HI-177 (with serial number 47500 and line number 546), was manufactured by McDonnell Douglas in 1969. The aircraft was powered by two Pratt & Whitney JT8D-7 turbofan engines. It had been in service with Dominicana for less than a month (with only 354 flying hours) when it crashed and was the only DC-9-30 purchased by the airline.

== Accident ==
The airliner was operating an international flight from Las Américas International Airport near Santo Domingo, to San Juan's Luis Muñoz Marín International Airport. The flight took off at about 6:30 PM. Two minutes after departure, one of the engines lost thrust. The crew declared an emergency, telling air traffic controllers that the right engine had flamed out, and requested to immediately return to the airport. While the crew were preparing to turn back toward the airport, the left engine also flamed out. The aircraft descended until it hit the sea about two miles south of the airport. There were no survivors among the 97 passengers and five crew members on board.

== Investigation ==
There were initially concerns of a terrorist attack as the family of Antonio Imbert Barrera was on board. However, the investigation concluded that the cause of the crash was the sequential failure of both engines caused by fuel contamination due to water ingress. Neither the cockpit voice recorder (CVR) or flight data recorder (FDR) was ever found.

== Notable victims ==
Several famous passengers were among the dead, including:

- Former world lightweight boxing champion Carlos Cruz, who was flying alongside his wife and their two children back to San Juan for a fight against Roger Zami.
- The coach and eleven players of the Puerto Rico women's national volleyball team, who were returning home after a friendly game against the Dominican Republic women's national volleyball team.

== Aftermath ==
Immediately after the Santo Domingo crash, Dominicana suspended all operations. Four of the airline's mechanics were reportedly arrested as well. In addition, the United States Federal Aviation Administration (FAA) banned Dominicana aircraft from operating to the United States. The ban was lifted later in the year after Dominicana leased a replacement DC-9 aircraft, to be flown by crews from the Spanish airline Iberia.

Dominicana eventually resumed full services, including to the United States. The airline flew until 1995 when the government of Joaquín Balaguer forced it to suspend services indefinitely, officially ceasing all operations in 1999.

== See also ==
- Aviation safety
- List of accidents involving sports teams
