= RED Air =

Charter airline in the Dominican Republic

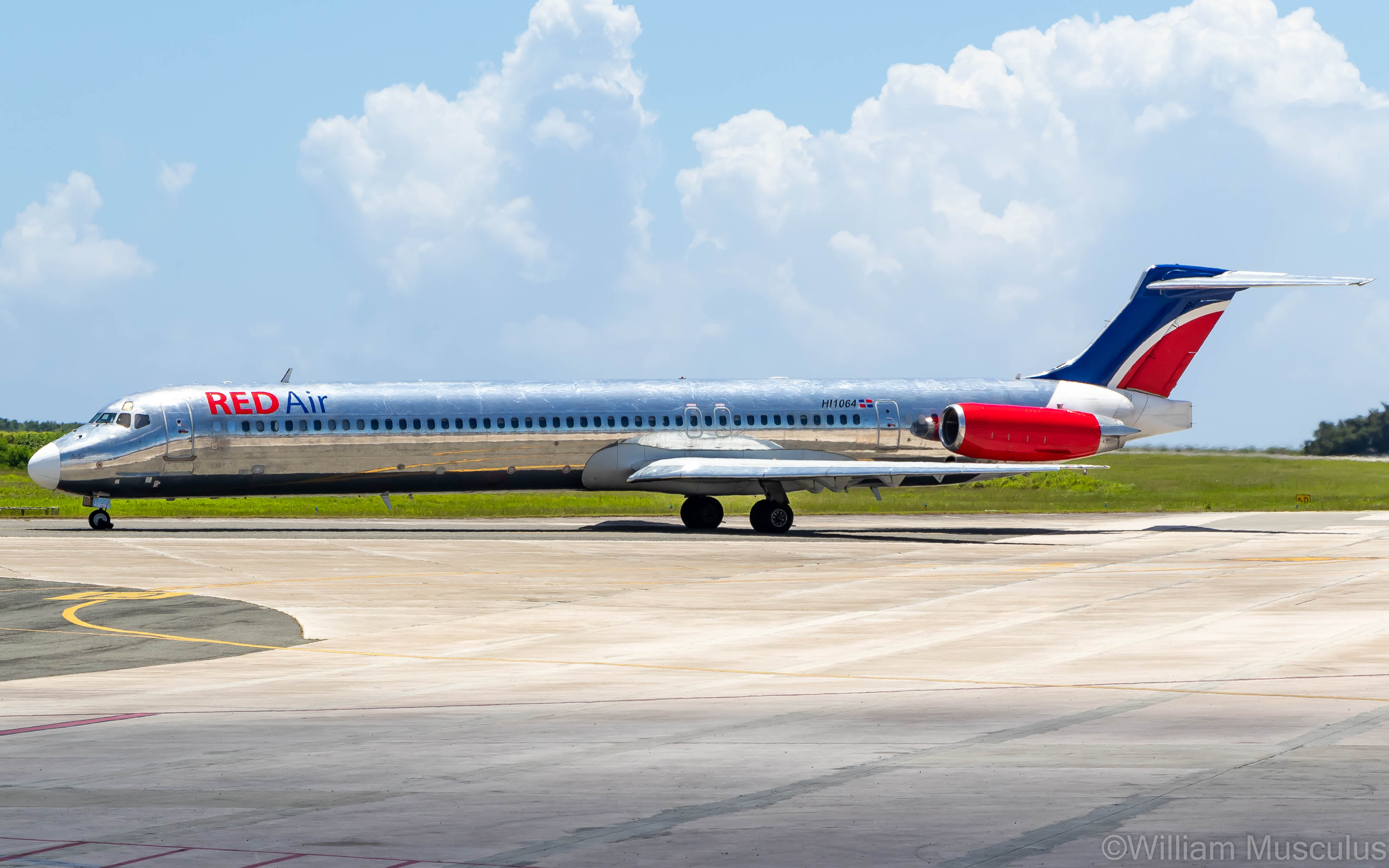
IATA	ICAO	Call sign
L5	REA	RED DOMINICANA
- Founded: January 2020; 6 years ago
- Commenced operations: November 2021; 4 years ago
- Hubs: La Romana International Airport
- Fleet size: 2
- Destinations: 5
- Parent company: LASER Airlines
- Headquarters: Santo Domingo, Dominican Republic
- Key people: Héctor Gómez (CEO); Josseily Hidalgo (HR)
- Website: redair.com.do

RED Air S.R.L. is a Dominican low-cost leisure airline with facilities in Las Américas International Airport and main offices in Santo Domingo, Dominican Republic.

== History ==
The airline was founded in January 2020 as a joint venture between the Venezuelan airline LASER Airlines and Dominican fixed-base operator SERVAIR Dominicana.

== Destinations ==
As of December 2024, RED Air serves scheduled flights to the following destinations:

Country	City	Airport	Notes	Refs
Curaçao	Willemstad	Curaçao International Airport		
Dominican Republic	La Romana	La Romana International Airport	Hub	
Dominican Republic	Santo Domingo	Las Américas International Airport		
United States	Miami	Miami International Airport	Operated by GlobalX	
Venezuela	Caracas	Simón Bolívar International Airport	Operated by LASER Airlines	

== Fleet ==
=== Current fleet ===
As of July 2026, RED Air operates the following aircraft:

RED Air fleet
Aircraft	In service	Orders	Passengers			Notes
Aircraft	In service	Orders	C	Y	Total	Notes
McDonnell Douglas MD-82	2	—	12	137	149	Former LASER Airlines aircraft.
Total	2	—				

=== Former fleet ===
RED Air formerly operated the following aircraft:

RED Air former fleet
Aircraft	Total	Introduced	Retired	Notes
Airbus A320-200	1	2024	2024	Leased from Galistair Malta
McDonnell Douglas MD-81	1	2020	2021	Leased from LASER Airlines

== Incidents ==
- On June 21, 2022, RED Air Flight 203 experienced a landing gear collapse. The McDonnell Douglas MD-82 (registered as HI1064) slid through a communications tower and caught fire at Miami International Airport. All 140 people on board survived. At least three people were hospitalized with reportedly-minor injuries. The aircraft has been written off as a total loss. The NTSB final report on the accident stated the cause of the accident was the left main landing gear's shimmy dampener failing to mitigate extreme vibrations during landing rollout. The vibrations caused the gear's lower torque link to fail and the entire left gear collapsed as a result.

== See also ==
- List of airlines of the Dominican Republic
