= Dominicana de Aviación Flight 401 =

1969 cargo flight crash in Miami, Florida

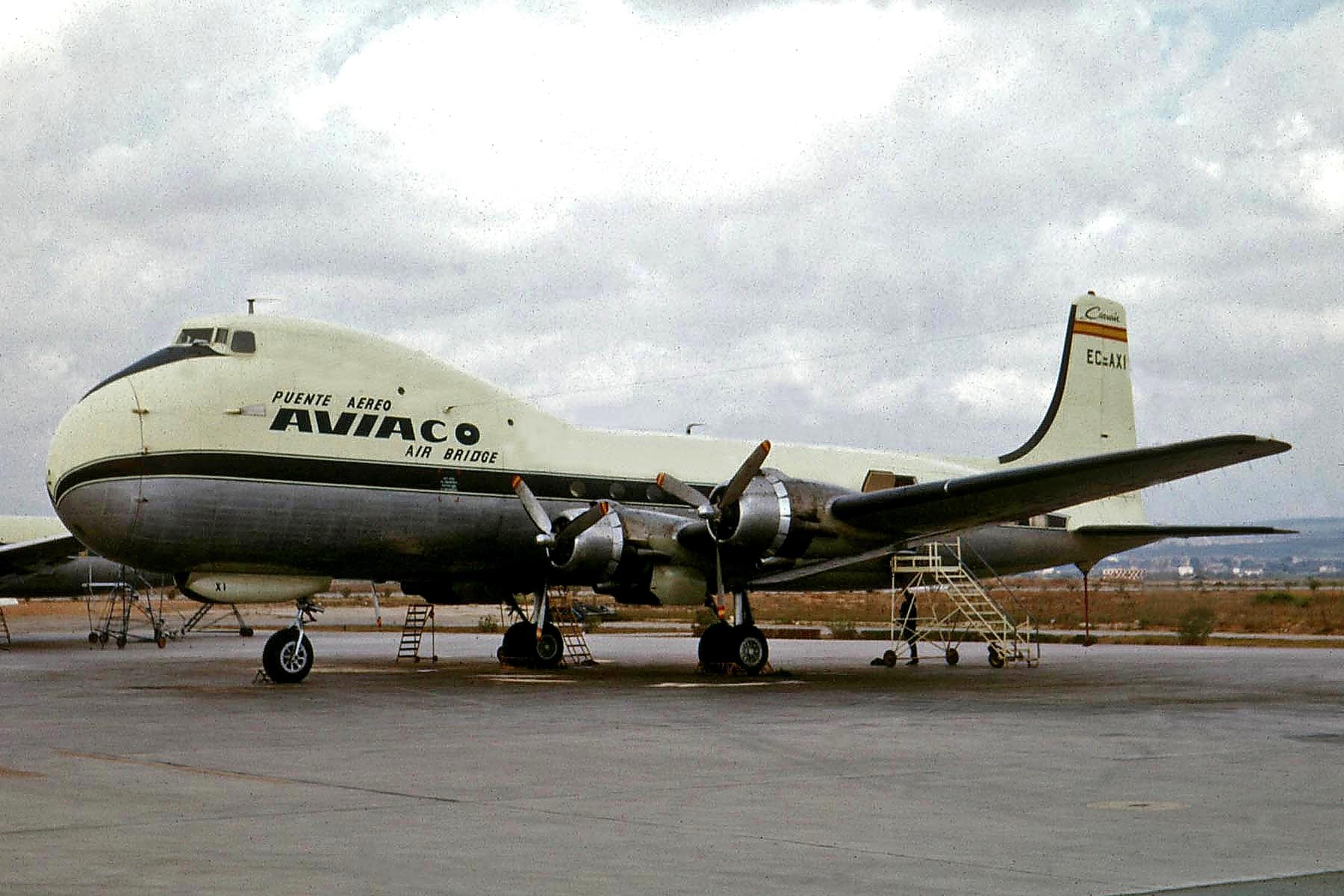
- The accident aircraft seen while still in service with Aviaco in 1967

Accident
- Date: June 23, 1969
- Summary: Multiple engine failures and fire; maintenance error & pilot error
- Site: Miami, Florida, United States
- Total fatalities: 10
- Total injuries: 12

Aircraft
- Aircraft type: Aviation Traders ATL-98 Carvair
- Operator: Dominicana de Aviación
- IATA flight No.: DO401
- ICAO flight No.: DOA401
- Call sign: DOMINICANA 401
- Registration: HI-168
- Flight origin: Miami International Airport, Florida, United States
- Destination: Las Américas International Airport, Santo Domingo, Dominican Republic
- Occupants: 4
- Passengers: 0
- Crew: 4
- Fatalities: 4
- Survivors: 0

Ground casualties
- Ground fatalities: 6
- Ground injuries: 12

Dominicana de Aviación Flight 401 was a regularly scheduled international cargo flight operating from Miami International Airport in the United States, to Las Américas International Airport, in the Dominican Republic. On June 23, 1969, the aircraft operating the flight, an Aviation Traders Carvair, suffered an engine failure and fire in two engines, leading to the aircraft crashing in downtown Miami, killing all 4 people on board, and 6 people on the ground.

== Background ==
=== Aircraft ===
The aircraft involved in the accident was a 25 year old ATL-98 Carvair, registered HI-168, and had originally been built as a Douglas C-54D Skymaster equipped with four Pratt & Whitney R-2800 Double Wasp engines. The conversion from a Douglas C-54D Skymaster to the ATL-98 Carvair occurred in 1964, and entered service with Aviaco later that year, registered EC-AXI. Dominicana acquired the aircraft in early 1969, being re-registered to HI-168.

=== Crew ===
In command was Captain Jorge Bujosa, aged 42. He had about 500 hours of his 13,736 flight hours on the Douglas DC-4/ATL-98 Carvair. During his training in 1967, he failed a performance exam that simulated dealing with an engine failure or an engine fire. Being hired in 1964, First Officer Carlos Brador, aged 30, was far less experienced than captain Bujosa, but still fairly experienced, having 2,333 flight hours, of which, 476 were logged on the Douglas DC-4/ATL-98 Carvair. The newest company member of the crew, only becoming a full-time employee in January 1969, Flight Engineer Carlos Gonzales had less than 100 flight hours, and at least 10 were on the Douglas DC-4/ATL-98 Carvair. A deadheading crew member was also present on board.

== Accident ==
While on their takeoff roll from runway 09L at 15:41 EDT (22:41 UTC), the number 2 engine began emitting a heavy white smoke and the crew, after being advised about the smoke by the air traffic controller at 15:42 EDT (22:42 UTC), did not reject the takeoff, and after lifting off and climbing to about 15 feet, engine 2 failed. The controller had noticed the smoke and eventual fire from the number 2 engine and had informed the crew that they could make an approach to any runway that they needed. The crew did not feather the engine and attempted to make a 90 degree turn back towards the airport. While leveling out at 300 ft, engine 4 also failed and caught fire, and the crew proceeded to feather the engine. After losing 2 engines, the aircraft was unable to maintain enough altitude to glide to the airport, and so the aircraft crashed into industrial buildings at 15:44:15 EDT (22:44:15 UTC) about a mile (1.5 km) from the airport, killing all 4 people on board, and 6 civilians on the ground.

== Investigation ==
After the accident, the National Transportation Safety Board (NTSB) launched an investigation into the accident. which lasted a year and nearly a month after the crash. The report was initially hampered by the fact the aircraft wasn't equipped with a CVR or a FDR, however, the investigators were able to determine a cause nonetheless. It highlighted multiple errors within Dominicana's maintenance and pilot training and sited the probable cause as follows:

Probable Cause: The Safety Board determines that the probable cause of this accident was the confused action on part of the crew while attempting to cope with the catastrophic failures of their engines during flight.

The investigation also revealed how Dominicana had been cutting costs and had failed to maintain their aircraft, and also failing to abide by a FAA issued notice that stated that Pratt & Whitney R-2800 Double Wasp engines had a tendency with the pistons to overwork, and disintegrate inside the engine, causing a fire.

=== Design flaw ===
The investigation made note of a potentially fatal flaw within the design of the aircraft. The hump, or bulge on the ATL-98 Carvair causes a massive amount of drag on the aircraft, which was noted to reduce the cruising speed of the aircraft in some occasions, prevented the aircraft from maintaining an altitude, which caused the aircraft to crash short of the airport. Without this hump, the aircraft likely would've made it back to the airport and landed safely.
