= RED Air Flight 203 =

2022 aviation accident in Florida

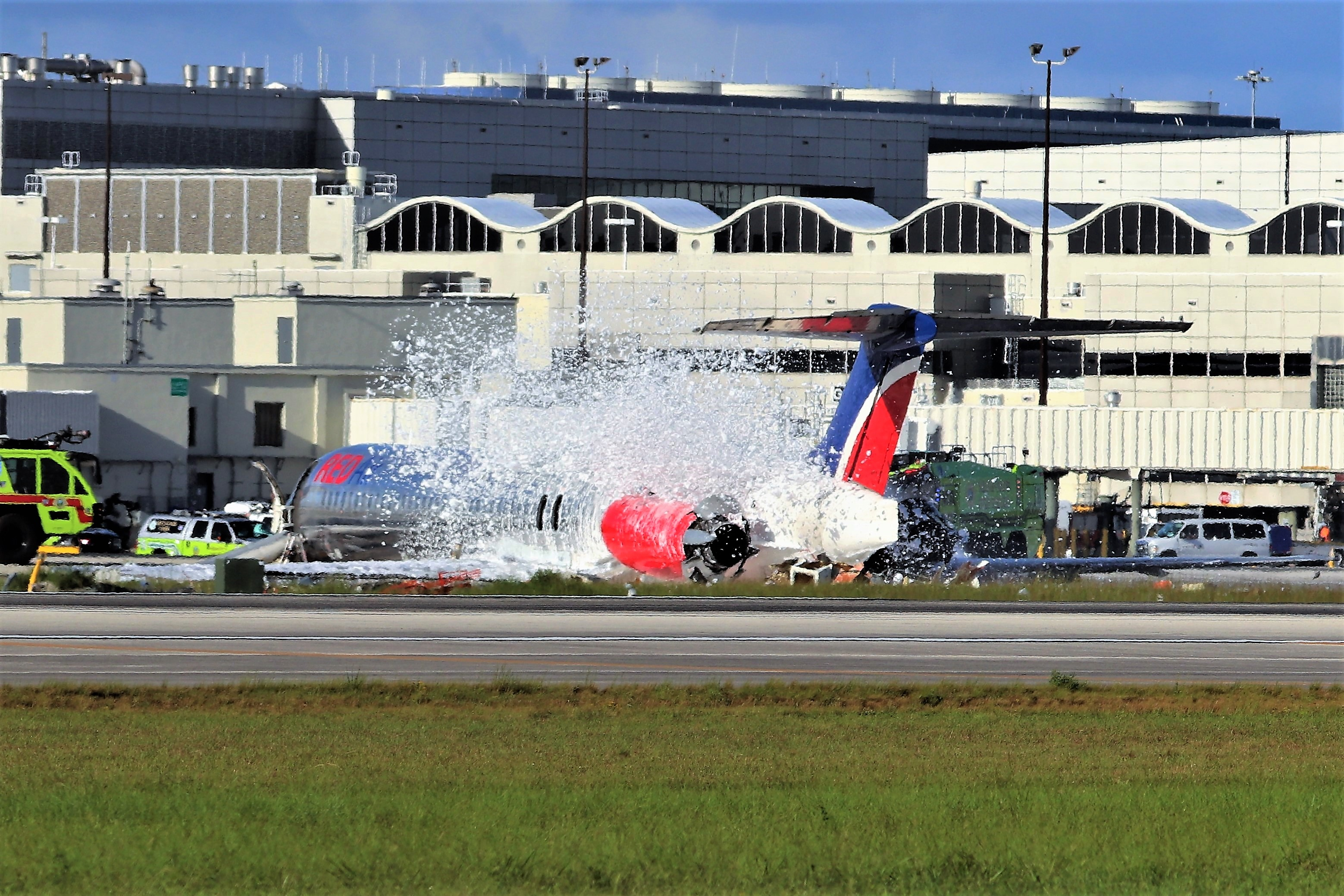
- The aircraft after overrunning the runway

Accident
- Date: June 21, 2022
- Summary: Runway excursion after landing gear collapse
- Site: Miami International Airport, Miami, Florida, United States

Aircraft
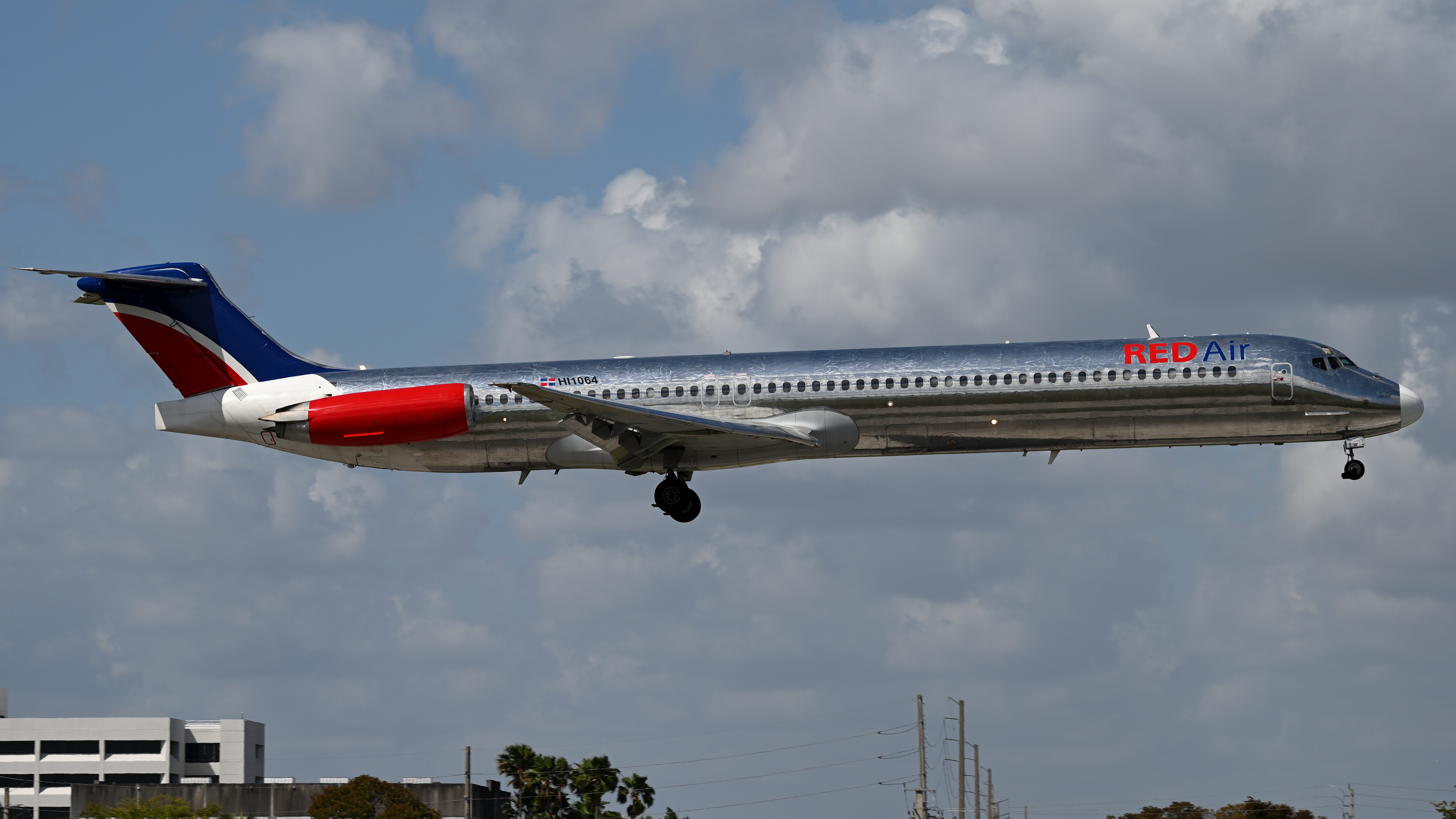
- HI1064, the aircraft involved in the accident, seen in March 2022
- Aircraft type: McDonnell Douglas MD-82
- Operator: RED Air
- IATA flight No.: L5203
- ICAO flight No.: REA203
- Call sign: RED DOMINICANA 203
- Registration: HI1064
- Flight origin: Las Américas International Airport, Santo Domingo, Dominican Republic
- Destination: Miami International Airport, Miami, Florida, United States
- Occupants: 140
- Passengers: 130
- Crew: 10
- Fatalities: 0
- Injuries: 4
- Survivors: 140

RED Air Flight 203 was a scheduled international passenger flight from Santo Domingo in the Dominican Republic to Miami International Airport by RED Air. On June 21, 2022, the McDonnell Douglas MD-82 aircraft operating the service suffered a left landing gear collapse and runway excursion, causing the left wing of the aircraft to impact an antenna structure, followed by a subsequent fire on the right side of the airplane. The incident caused four people to be hospitalized with minor injuries.

== Aircraft ==
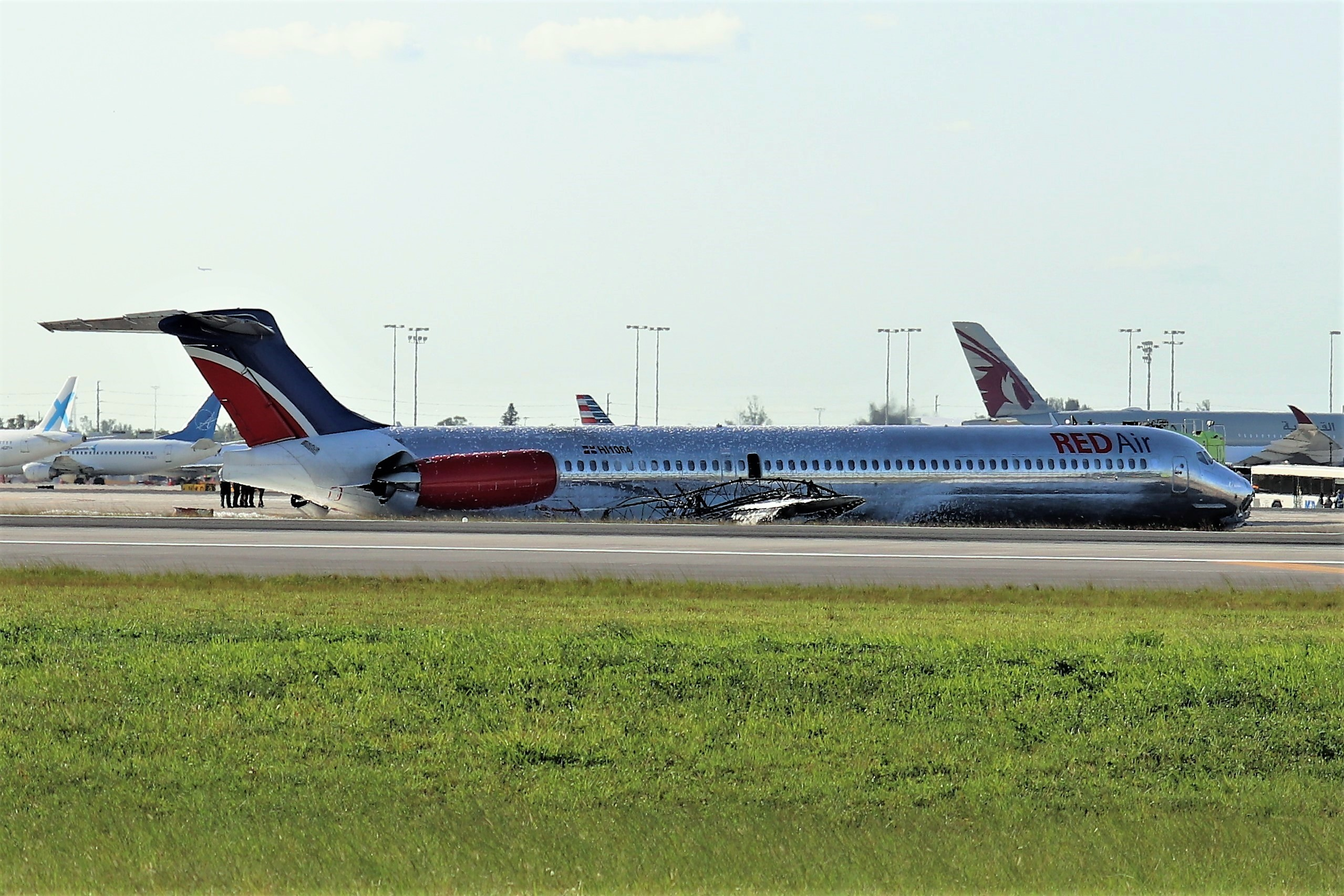
A northeast view of the plane after the fire was put out

The aircraft involved in the accident was a McDonnell Douglas MD-82 with the registration of HI1064 and serial number 53027. The aircraft was transferred to RED Air, a subsidiary of LASER Airlines, in February 2021.

== Passengers and crew ==
There were 140 occupants on board the accident flight: 130 passengers and 10 crew members. Airport officials reported that all of them survived. The local fire rescue authorities reported that four people suffered minor injuries and were sent to the hospital.

The flight crew consisted of 58-year-old Captain José Darriba, out of 14,388 total flight hours, 1,400 were on the MD-80; and 28-year-old First Officer Pablo Peña had 269 hours of experience on the MD-80, out of 822 total flight hours. Captain Darriba was the pilot monitoring, while First Officer Peña was flying the aircraft.

== Incident ==
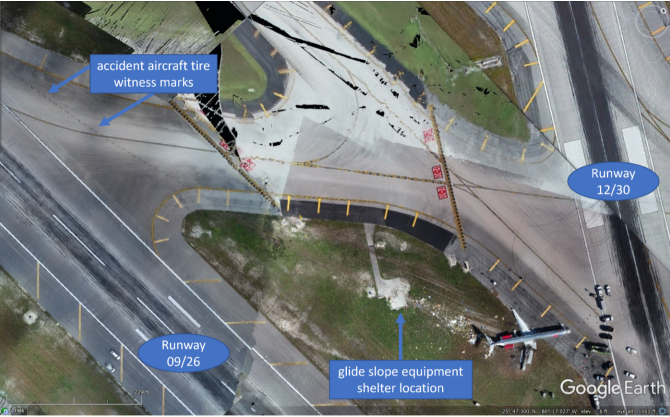
Aerial image of the aircraft wreckage.

According to Flightradar24, RED Air Flight 203 departed from Las Américas International Airport in the Dominican Republic at 3:36 PM (19:36 UTC) and landed at Miami International Airport on runway 09 at 5:38 PM (21:38 UTC) after a flight time of two hours and three minutes on June 21, 2022. During landing, the aircraft's left main landing gear collapsed, causing the aircraft's left wing to scratch the runway. Just before the aircraft came to a full stop, the right landing gear and nose landing gear also collapsed, resulting in damage to the aircraft's nose and a fire on the right wing. Firefighters found fuel leaking from the aircraft when they arrived on scene. The aircraft had also reportedly collided with a communication tower and a small building before catching fire. Passengers began evacuating the plane about 5 seconds after the aircraft stopped and fled with their personal belongings. This became RED Air's first aircraft to be involved in a hull loss accident.

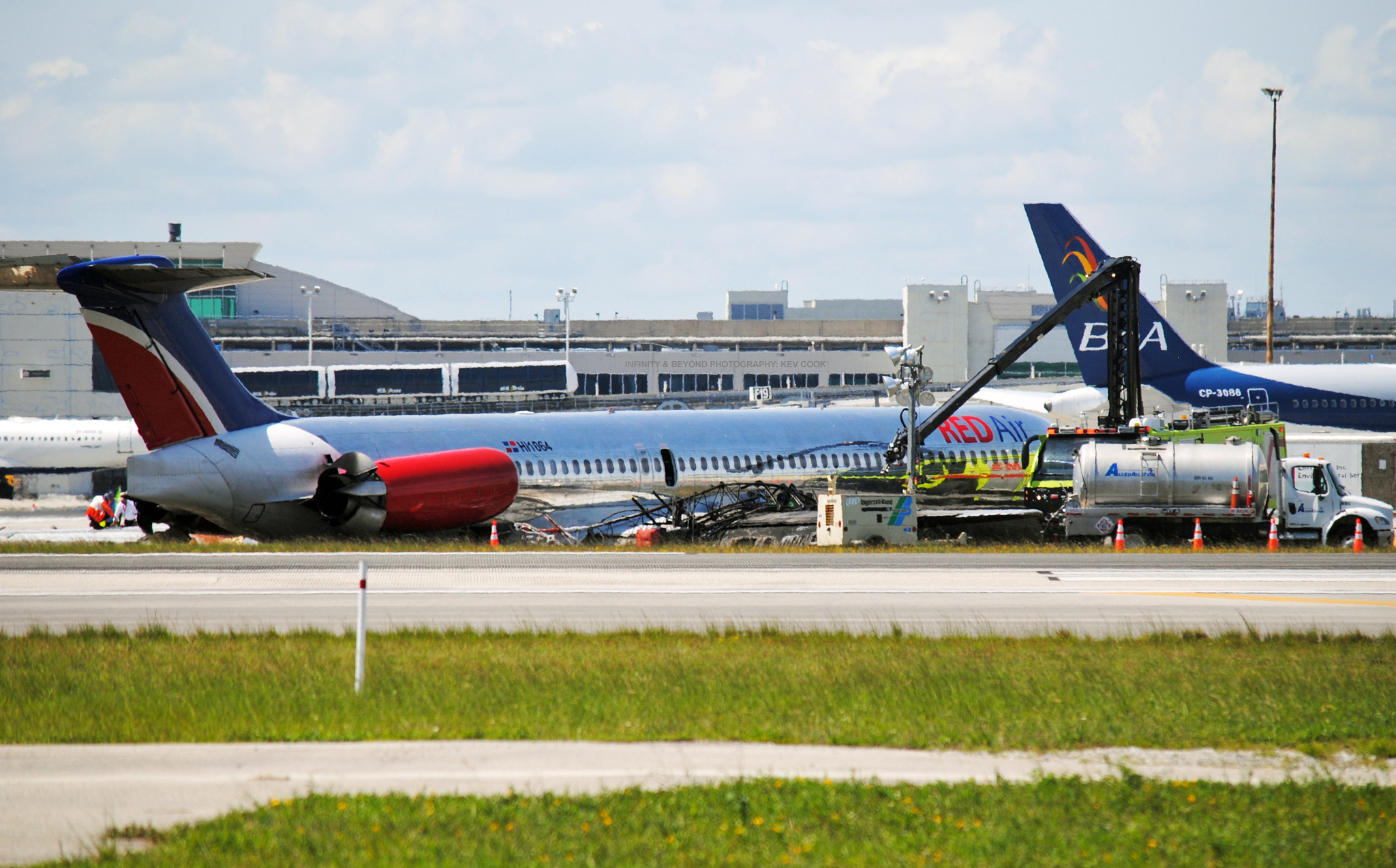
Wreckage after the incident

=== Footage of the incident ===
The scene was captured by Miami International Airport's CCTV camera and a ground crew employee's cellphone. Two videos were subsequently released showing scenes onboard the aircraft during the landing and when the passengers were evacuating the aircraft. The footage was recorded by one of the passengers onboard. The first video shows the aircraft's landing and the unusual vibrations before the left landing gear collapsed. The collapse of the left landing gear was heard at the end of the first video. The second video shows the passenger who recorded the footage exiting the aircraft. Another smartphone video was released, showing the moment inside the plane from touch down on the runway until the stop of the aircraft. This video shows not just what the other onboard video shows, but also the passengers' reactions during the incident.

== Investigation ==
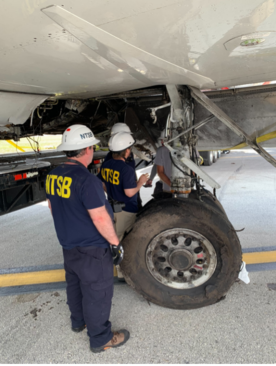
NTSB investigators inspecting the left main landing gear.

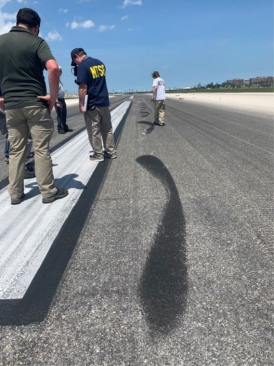
NTSB investigators inspecting tire witness marks on runway 09

The National Transportation Safety Board (NTSB) arrived on scene the following day and began an investigation. A preliminary report issued by the NTSB cited four minor injuries to passengers, rather than the three originally reported by news outlets. Both flight recorders (data and voice) were recovered and their data was successfully downloaded by the NTSB. The NTSB also removed the left and right main landing gear from the aircraft for further evaluation.

=== Preliminary report ===
The NTSB released their preliminary report into the accident on July 15, 2022 stated that, the flight was the second of the day from the actual flight crew. The captain was the pilot monitoring while the first officer was the pilot flying. The flight departed Las Américas International Airport, Santo Domingo at 15:35 after a delay of 36 minutes. The airplane was cleared to land at Miami International Airport, Miami runway 09 with an Instrument Landing System (ILS) approach with the pilot reporting that the approach was normal. The first officer reported that the landing was smooth, and they first touched down on the right main gear followed by the left main gear slightly right of centerline. The pilots had the sensation of an increase in vibration on the left side of the aircraft shortly after the left main gear touched down. During the landing roll-out the left main gear collapsed, the airplane traveled to the left, departed the paved surface and impacted the runway 30 glide slope equipment shelter. During departure from the paved surface and impact with the steel and concrete shelter, the airplane's right main landing gear and nosewheel collapsed, and the fuel tanks were breached. Shortly after the airplane came to a stop, a postcrash fire began on the right wing. All 140 occupants of the airplane evacuated safely and four of them sustained minor injuries. The Miami-Dade Fire Rescue Department (MDFR) is successfully extinguished the post-crash fire and all occupants of the plane were transferred to the airport's terminal with buses.

An investigation docket of the accident was opened by NTSB on July 31, 2023.

=== Final report ===
The NTSB released their final report on the accident on April 25, 2024, which stated the cause of the accident was the left main landing gear's shimmy damper failing to mitigate extreme vibrations during landing rollout. The vibrations caused the gear's lower torque link to fail and the entire left gear collapsed as a result.

== See also ==
- DHL Aero Expreso Flight 7216
- Emirates Flight 521
- Tibet Airlines Flight 9833
- FedEx Express Flight 910
