= Punta Caucedo =

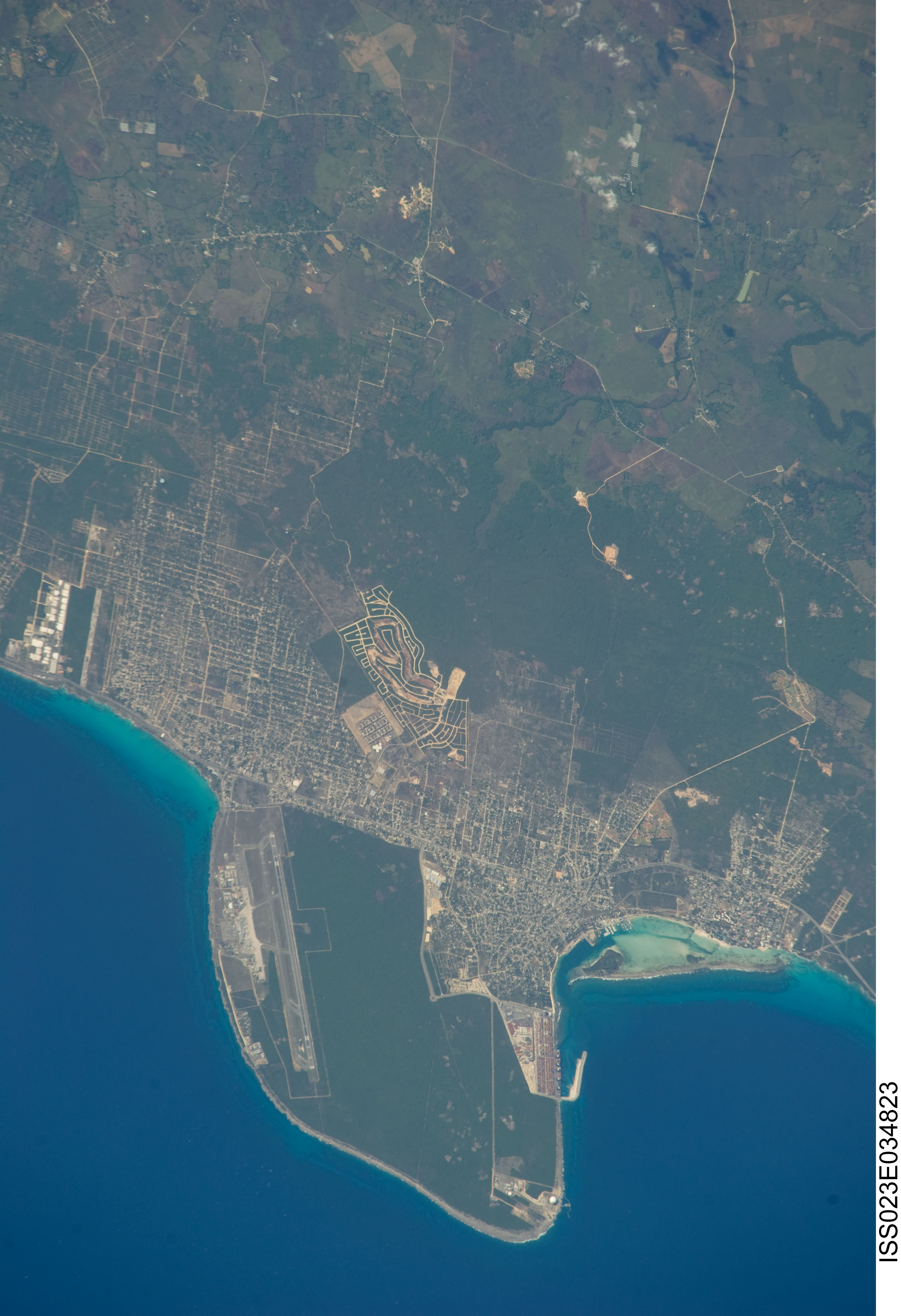
- Satellite view of Punta Caucedo by Expedition 23 (2010)

- Location within the Dominican Republic
- Coordinates: 18°25′19″N 69°39′25″W
- Country: Dominican Republic
- Province: Santo Domingo Province
- Municipio: Boca Chica

Government
  - Mayor: Ramón Arístides Candelaria Santana (PCR)

Population (2008)
  - Total: 17,643
- Time zone: UTC−04:00 (AST)
- Postal code: 15700
- Website: ayuntamientobocachica.gob.do (in Spanish)

Punta Caucedo is a small cape located in the south coast of the Dominican Republic, 15 miles (24 km) east from Santo Domingo. Las Américas International Airport is located at Punta Caucedo. It opened October 24, 1959 with a 6,600 ft. runway and a highway link to the capital city of Santo Domingo.

The Multimodal Caucedo Port was established on Punta Caucedo in 2003.

The cape is a sector in the city of Boca Chica in the Santo Domingo Province of the Dominican Republic.
