= General Andrews Airport =

General Andrews Airport Aeropuerto General Andrews
- IATA: none; ICAO: none

Summary
- Airport type: Public / Military (Defunct)
- Operator: Pan American World Airways / Dominican Government
- Serves: Santo Domingo (formerly Ciudad Trujillo)
- Location: Centro Olímpico Juan Pablo Duarte, Santo Domingo
- Opened: January 22, 1944
- Closed: 1959
- Coordinates: 18.478276°N 69.916788°W

Map
- Location of airport in the Dominican Republic

General Andrews Airport was an international airport located in Santo Domingo (then known as Ciudad Trujillo), Dominican Republic. Operating from 1944 until the late 1950s, it served as the country's primary gateway before being replaced by the modern Las Américas International Airport (originally known as Punta Caucedo).

The airport was situated in what is now the Centro Olímpico Juan Pablo Duarte, a central district of the modern capital. It is frequently confused with the Herrera Airport (which served domestic flights) and the San Isidro Air Base (formerly Base Aérea Trujillo).

== History ==
=== Early Aviation and Construction ===
Before the construction of General Andrews, aviation in Santo Domingo was centered around the Miraflores airfield. In the early 1940s, the government of dictator Rafael Trujillo, in cooperation with Pan American World Airways (Pan Am), authorized the construction of a modern airport to handle the increasing air traffic and larger aircraft of the era.

The airport was inaugurated on January 22, 1944, as part of the celebrations for the Centennial of the Dominican Republic. It was named after Lieutenant General Frank Maxwell Andrews, a senior United States Army officer and aviation advocate who had died in a plane crash in Iceland in 1943.

=== Operations ===
During its operational life, General Andrews Airport was the hub for international travel, hosting airlines such as Pan Am, KLM, and the nascent Compañía Dominicana de Aviación. The terminal building was considered modern for its time, featuring a distinct architectural style often associated with the "Trujillo Era" public works.

It played a critical role in the connectivity of the Caribbean during the post-World War II commercial aviation boom. However, as jet aircraft began to emerge, the airport's location within the expanding urban fabric of Ciudad Trujillo limited the possibility of runway expansion.

=== Closure and Legacy ===
By the mid-1950s, it became clear that a new facility was needed. The government commissioned the construction of the "Aeropuerto Internacional de Punta Caucedo" (now Las Américas International Airport) on a peninsula east of the city.

General Andrews ceased operations around 1959/1960 when traffic moved to the new airport. Following its closure, the land was repurposed. In the 1970s, the site was redeveloped into the Centro Olímpico Juan Pablo Duarte, the country's primary sports complex, for the 1974 Central American and Caribbean Games.

Today, traces of the old runway alignment can still be discerned in the layout of the Olympic Center streets and facilities.

== Confusion with other airports ==
General Andrews is often historically confused with:

- Miraflores Airfield: The landing strip that existed in the same area prior to the 1944 construction of the formal terminal.
- Herrera Airport: Located further west, which operated as the domestic airport until 2006.
- San Isidro Air Base: A military installation in Guerra.
- Punta Caucedo: The airport that replaced General Andrews.

== See also ==
- Las Américas International Airport
- Compañía Dominicana de Aviación
- Transportation in the Dominican Republic
