= LASER Airlines =

Venezuelan airline

LASER Airlines C.A.

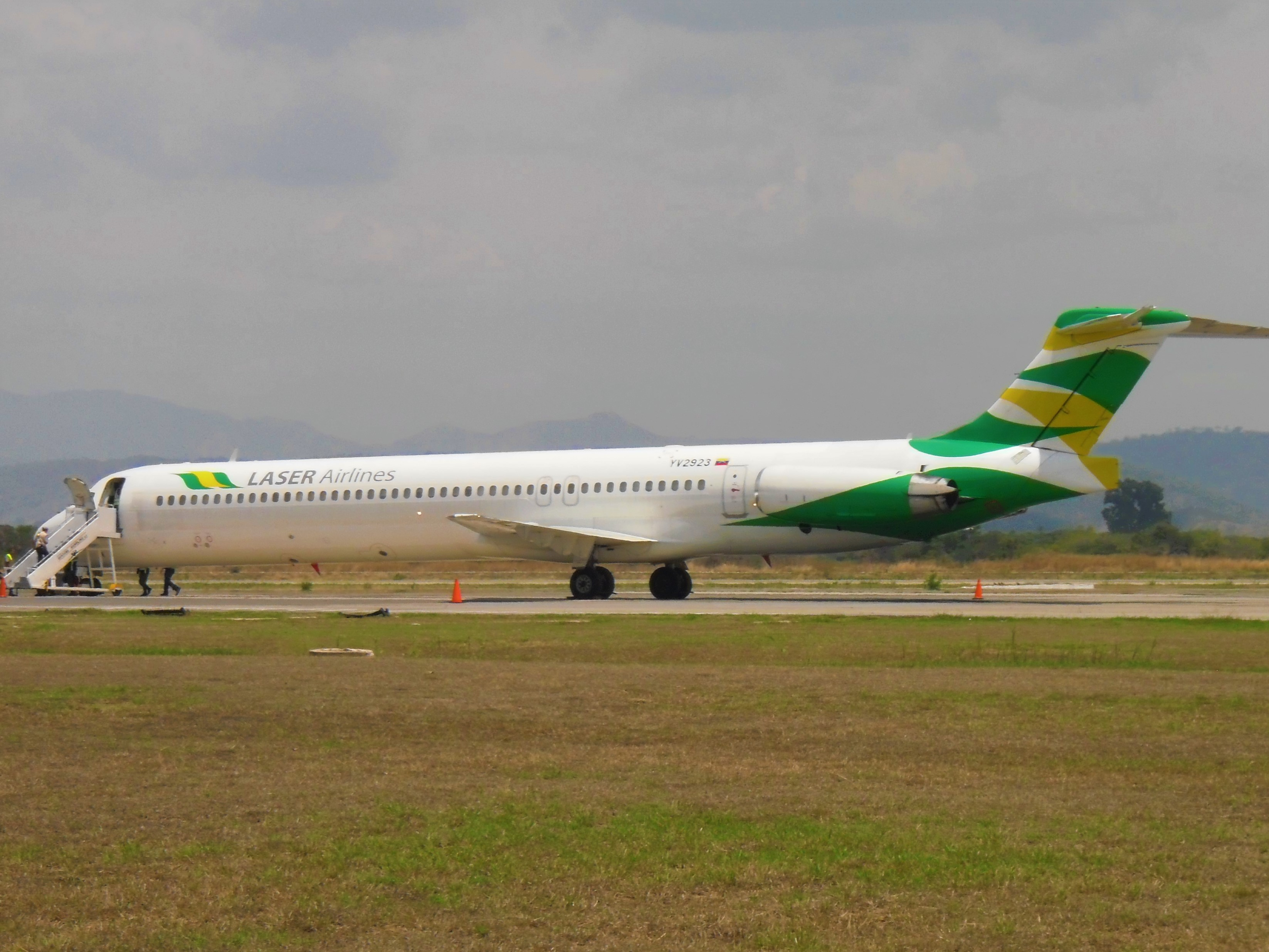
IATA	ICAO	Call sign
QL	LER	LASER
- Founded: September 1993
- Commenced operations: March 11, 1994
- Hubs: Simón Bolívar International Airport
- Secondary hubs: La Romana International Airport
- Focus cities: Santiago Mariño Caribbean International Airport
- Frequent-flyer program: LASER Club
- Subsidiaries: RED Air
- Fleet size: 10
- Destinations: 12
- Headquarters: Caracas, Venezuela
- Key people: Orlan Viloria (President); René Cortés (VP)
- Website: www.laserairlines.com

LASER Airlines (Spanish: Línea Aérea de Servicio Ejecutivo Regional, C.A., lit. 'Air Line of Regional Executive Service[s], C.A.') is a regional airline based in Caracas, Venezuela. It operates scheduled and passenger charter services within Venezuela, the Caribbean, and South America. Its main hub is Simón Bolívar International Airport.

== History ==
The airline was established in September 1993 and started operations on March 11, 1994. At the beginning, the company had one Douglas DC-9-14, and only the following year purchased a Boeing 727-200. It began to expand domestic and international destinations, becoming one of Venezuela’s main airlines.

After the outbreak of the Venezuelan crisis in 2014, due to the embargo sanctions imposed by the United States, some of LASER’s international routes were changed to originate and end at Las Américas International Airport in Dominican Republic to ensure that relevant routes continue to operate.

LASER began to fly to Miami in an alliance with World Atlantic Airlines, which has been a partner since November 2016. The flight route was created daily, with a second frequency added by partnering with Swift Air to offer greater comfort to passengers. It was possible to expand the baggage allowance and operate 2 classes. Both were operated with the Boeing 737, thus dissolving the alliance with World Atlantic. Subsequently, due to the decision taken by the United States Government, on May 15, 2019, flights to Venezuela from the United States were suspended indefinitely. Due to this, LASER created a hub at Las Americas International Airport, adding frequency to this destination, leaving 2 daily frequencies and with the possibility of connecting to Miami, maintaining the alliance with Swift Air.

On December 1, 2019, LASER was forced to cancel its Caracas-Guayaquil route due to complex migratory demands by the Government of Ecuador for Venezuelans. Still, a few weeks later, it announced a new route to Caracas-Bogotá with a daily frequency that began operating on February 10, 2020.

In January 2020, LASER formed a subsidiary low-cost airline named RED Air, under a joint venture with a Dominican corporation, SERVAIR.

== Destinations ==
As of April 2026, LASER operates services to the following domestic and international scheduled destinations:

Country	City	Airport	Notes	Refs
Colombia	Bogotá	El Dorado International Airport		
Curaçao	Willemstad	Curaçao International Airport		
Dominican Republic	La Romana	La Romana International Airport	Suspended	
Dominican Republic	Santo Domingo	Las Américas International Airport		
Panama	Panama City	Tocumen International Airport	Suspended	
Spain	Madrid	Madrid–Barajas Airport	Operated by Hi Fly	
United States	Miami	Miami International Airport		
Venezuela	Barcelona	General José Antonio Anzoátegui International Airport		
Venezuela	Caracas	Simón Bolívar International Airport	Hub	
Venezuela	El Vigía	Juan Pablo Pérez Alfonzo Airport		
Venezuela	La Fría	Francisco García de Hevia Airport		
Venezuela	Maracaibo	La Chinita International Airport		
Venezuela	Porlamar	Santiago Mariño Caribbean International Airport	Focus city	
Venezuela	Puerto Ordaz	Manuel Carlos Piar Guayana Airport		
Venezuela	Santo Domingo	Mayor Buenaventura Vivas Airport		

=== Codeshare agreements ===
- Plus Ultra Líneas Aéreas

== Fleet ==
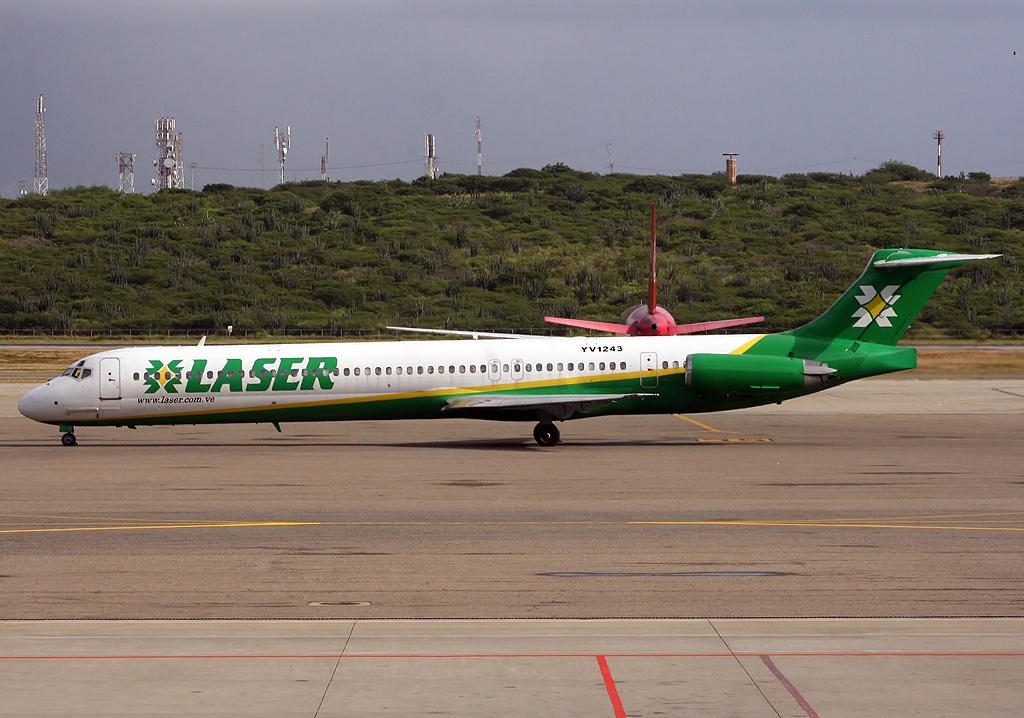
A McDonnell Douglas MD-81 taxiing at Simón Bolívar International Airport in 2011

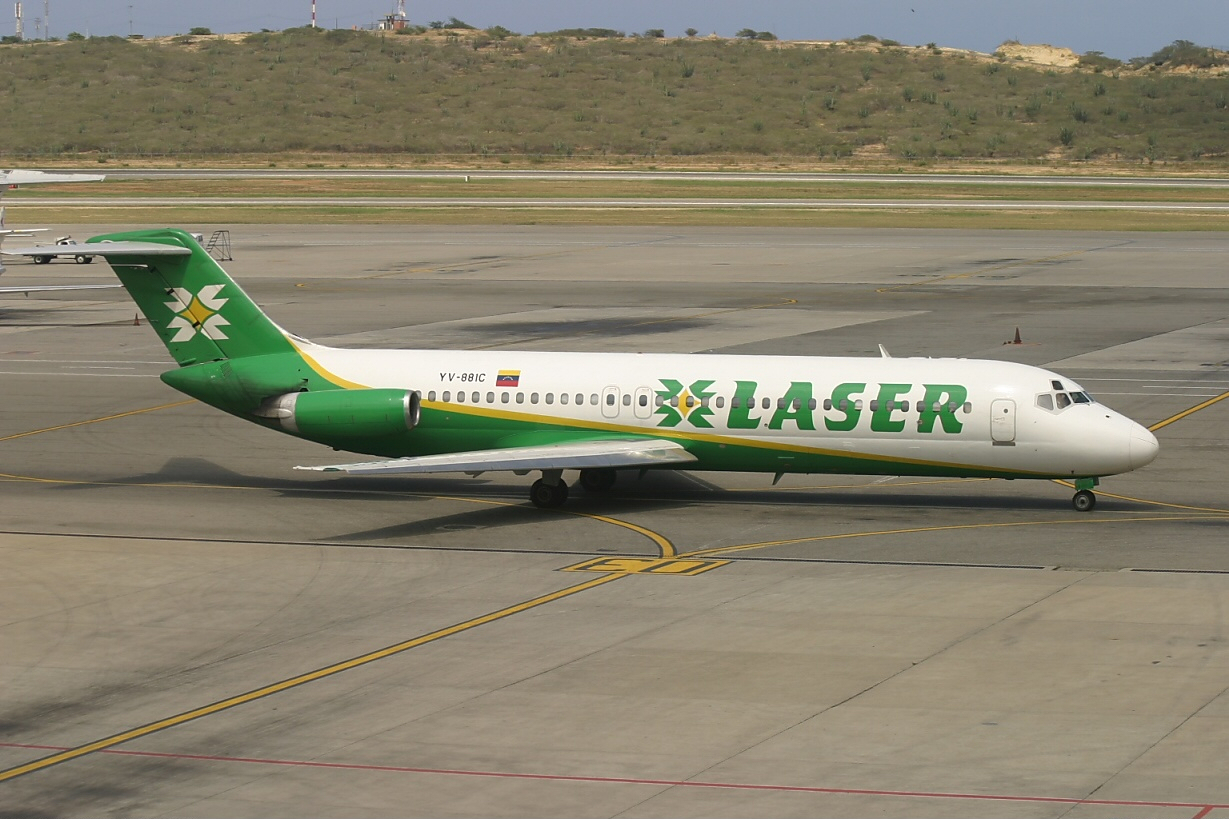
A McDonnell Douglas DC-9-32 taxiing at Simón Bolívar International Airport in 2003

=== Current ===
As of May 2025, LASER Airlines operates an all McDonnell Douglas fleet which consists of the following aircraft:

Aircraft	In service	Orders	Passengers			Notes
Aircraft	In service	Orders	C	Y	Total	Notes
McDonnell Douglas MD-81	4	—	–	163	163	Last commercial operator
McDonnell Douglas MD-82	4	—	12	137	149	
McDonnell Douglas MD-83	2	—	12	129	141	
Total	10	—				

=== Former ===
LASER Airlines had in the past operated the following aircraft

Aircraft	Total	Introduced	Retired	Notes
Airbus A330-200	2	2024	2025	Leased from Hi Fly
Boeing 727-200	3	1995	2000	
McDonnell Douglas DC-9-10	1	1994	2007	
McDonnell Douglas DC-9-30	6	1999	2016	

== Accidents and incidents ==
- On March 17, 2014, a McDonnell Douglas MD-82 (registered YV2945) flying from Porlamar to Valencia with 96 people on board, burst both nose gear tires while landing at Arturo Michelena International Airport and came to a stop on the runway with the tires and both nose wheels damaged, and was disabled. No injuries occurred.
- On May 25, 2021, a McDonnell Douglas MD-83 (registered YV3465) made an emergency landing after a failure in the left engine. The crew reported that a bird strike caused the failure. The aircraft landed back safely at Simón Bolívar International Airport, and all 116 on board were uninjured.
- On April 28, 2024, a McDonnell Douglas MD-83 operating flight 943 from Caracas to Santo Domingo reported smoke on board during takeoff. Emergency slides were deployed, and all 91 people on board evacuated, although some injuries were reported.

== See also ==
- List of airlines of Venezuela
