= APA International Air =

APA International Air Republica Dominicana S.A.
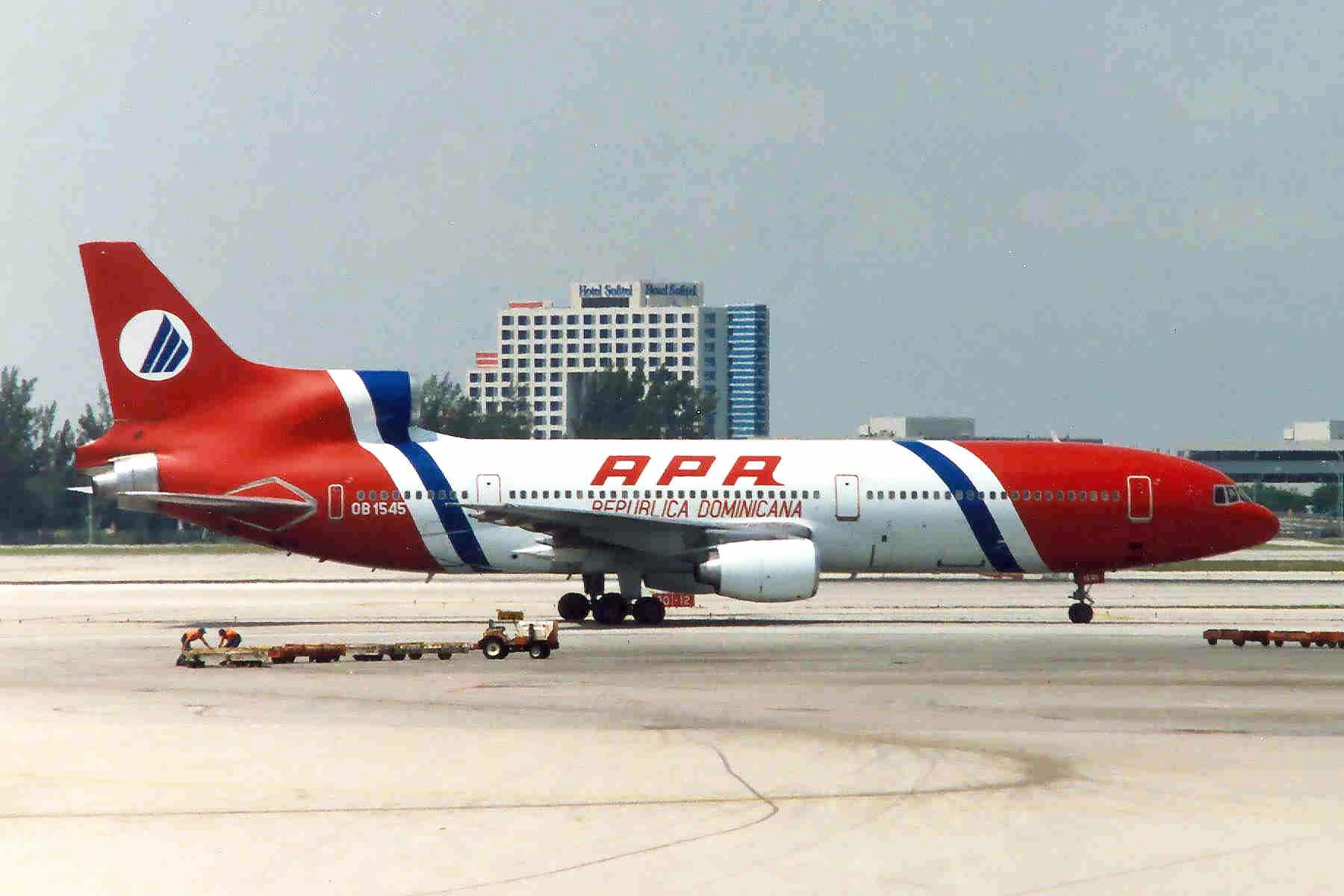
IATA	ICAO	Call sign
7P	APY	APA INTERNACIONAL
- Founded: February 1980
- Ceased operations: 2001
- Hubs: Las Américas International Airport
- Secondary hubs: Miami International Airport
- Focus cities: John F. Kennedy International Airport
- Frequent-flyer program: LatinPass
- Destinations: 8
- Headquarters: Miami, Florida, United States
- Website: apainternacionalair.com

APA International Air, Inc. was a Dominican airline that was operational between 1980 and 2001.

== History ==
The airline was founded in February 1980 as a freight charter company. It started operations with a Douglas DC-6 from Santo Domingo to Puerto Plata. In the mid-1990's, APA International Air focused on regular passenger flights with wet-leased aircraft from Faucett Perú. By the end of 2001, APA faced financial difficulties following the September 11 attacks.

== Destinations ==
Country	City	Airport	Notes
Dominican Republic	Puerto Plata	Gregorio Luperón International Airport	
Dominican Republic	Santo Domingo	Las Américas International Airport	Hub
Haiti	Port Au Prince	Toussaint Louverture International Airport	
Panama	Panama City	Tocumen International Airport	
Puerto Rico	San Juan	Luis Muñoz Marín International Airport	
United States	Miami	Miami International Airport	Hub
United States	New York City	John F. Kennedy International Airport	Focus city
Venezuela	Caracas	Simón Bolívar International Airport	

== Fleet ==
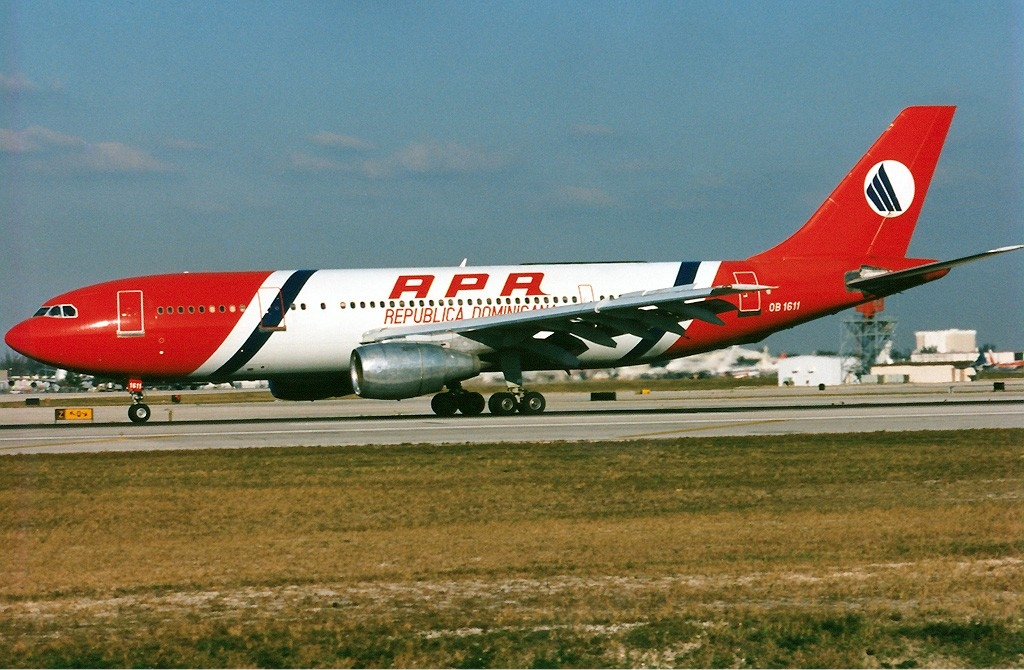
An APA International Air Airbus A300B4 taxiing at Miami International Airport in 1996

APA International Air operated the following aircraft:

Aircraft	Total	Introduced	Retired	Notes
Airbus A300B4	4	1994	1996	Leased from Faucett Perú
Boeing 727-200	1	1996	1996	Leased form Av Atlantic
Douglas C-118A Liftmaster	1	1990	1990	
Douglas DC-6B	1	1986	1990	
Douglas DC-8-55CF	1	1982	1984	Leased from Iberia and operated by LACSA
Lockheed L-1011 TriStar	2	1994	1996	Leased from Faucett Perú

== See also ==
- List of defunct airlines of the Dominican Republic
