= Visiting friends and relatives =

Type of tourism

Visiting friends and relatives (VFR tourism / VFR travel) is a type of tourism that encompasses a broad category of individuals travelling to a destination primarily for the purposes of meeting friends and relatives. The flow of travel is usually outbound from major urban centers and inbound to more rural settlements, although this is not always the case.

One definition of VFR travel is "a form of travel involving a visit whereby either (or both) the purpose of the trip or the type of accommodation involves visiting friends and / or relatives." This has subsequently been developed into definitional model for VFR to describe it visually.

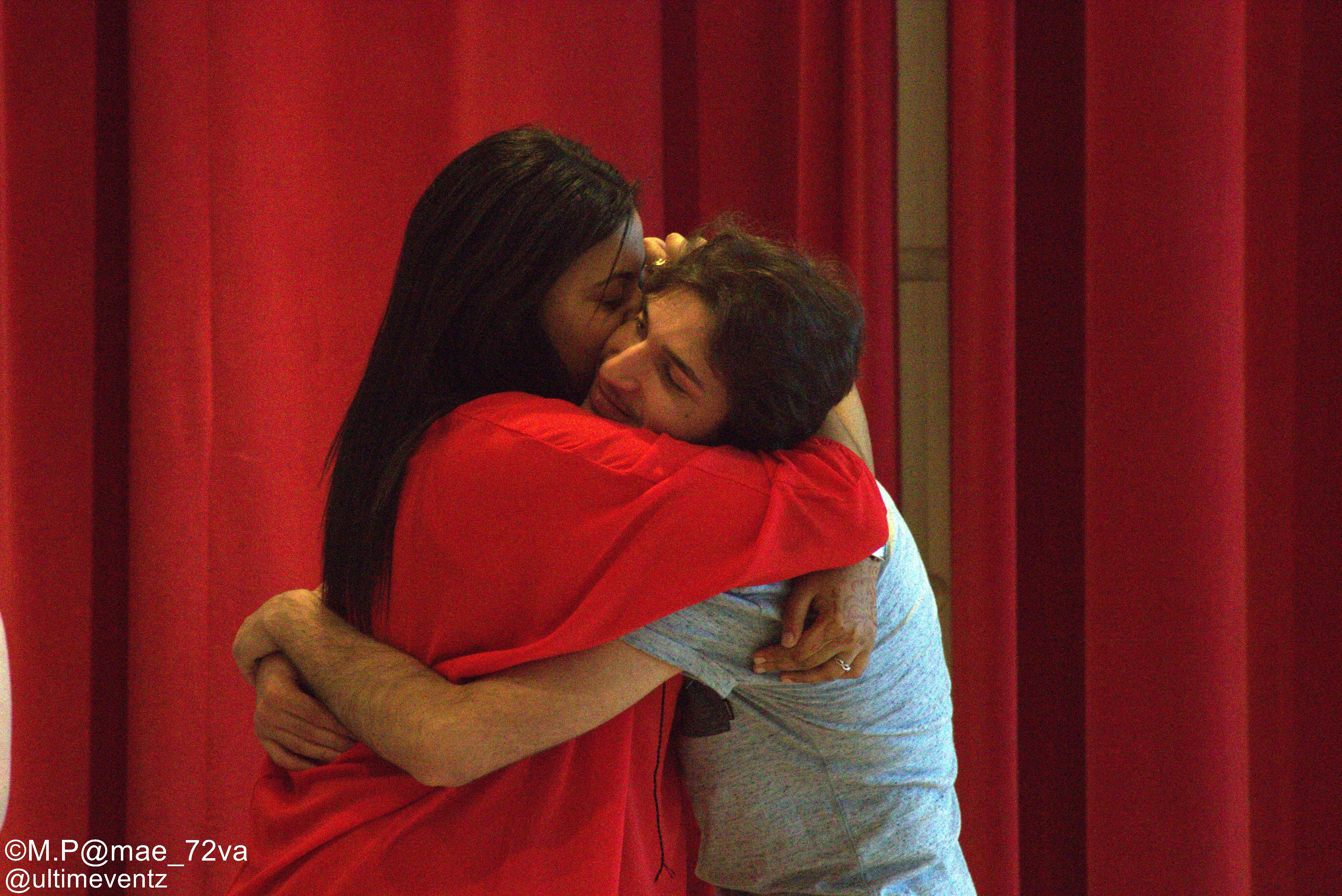
Reunion of family members

VFR expenditures tend to be quite broad, spread widely throughout the community rather than confined to the narrow tourism sector (McKercher, 1995). In some expenditure categories, VFR travellers have been shown to outspend non-VFR travellers (Seaton & Palmer, 1997; Morrison, Verginis et al., 2000).

Common time periods of VFR travel include festive seasons or during school holidays. VFR traffic is primarily driven by diasporic populations settling abroad, usually in more economically prosperous or urban areas.

== Flight routes primarily driven by VFR traffic ==
=== Asia ===
- Singapore to Kuantan
- Singapore to Ipoh
- Dubai to Manila

=== Europe ===
- Hanover to Kostanay
- London to Sylhet
- Prague to Hanoi
- Amritsar to London
- Luxembourg to Porto

=== North America ===
- New York to Rzeszow
- Providence to Praia
