= Las Américas International Airport =

Airport in the Dominican Republic

Las Américas International Airport Aeropuerto Internacional Las Américas

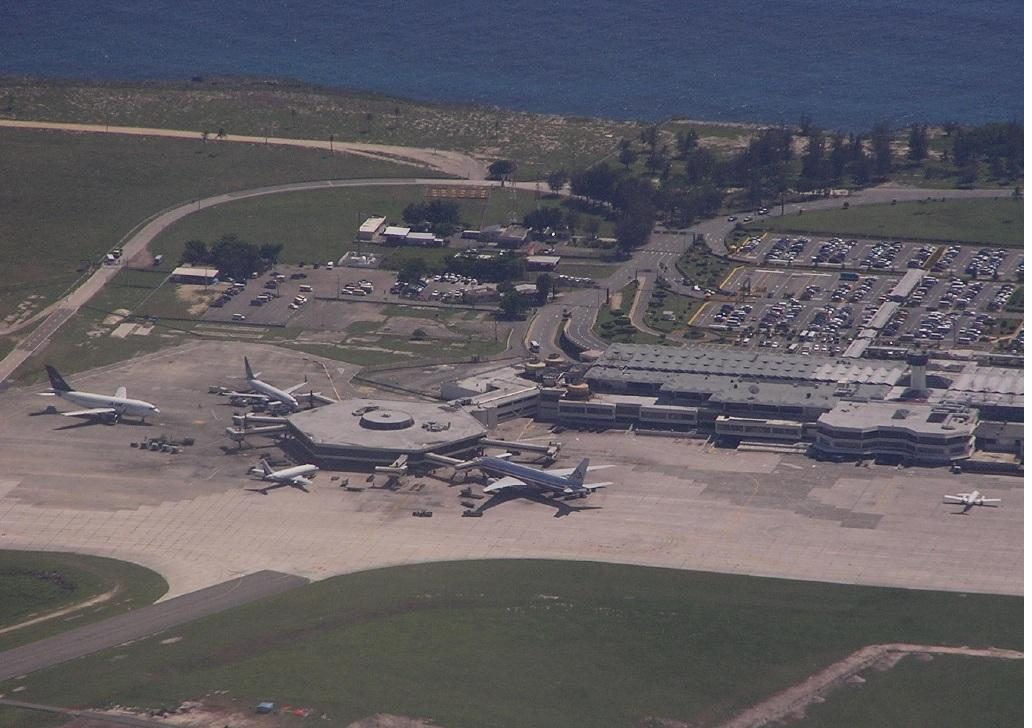
- Las Américas International Airport in 2007
- IATA: SDQ; ICAO: MDSD

Summary
- Airport type: Public
- Owner: Aerodom
- Serves: Santo Domingo
- Location: Punta Caucedo, Dominican Republic
- Hub for: Arajet; SKYhigh Dominicana
- Elevation AMSL: 58 ft (18 m)
- Coordinates: 18°25′46″N 069°40′08″W
- Website: aeropuertolasamericas.com

Map
- Location of airport in the Dominican Republic

Runways
Direction	Length		Surface
Direction	m	ft	Surface
17/35	3,353	11,001	Asphalt

Statistics (2025)
- Total passengers: 9,882,365
- Aircraft operations: 46,380
- Source: Central Bank of the Dominican Republic (BCRD), Instituto Dominicano de Aviación Civil (IDAC)

Las Américas International Airport (Spanish: Aeropuerto Internacional Las Américas, abbreviation; AILA) (IATA: SDQ, ICAO: MDSD), officially Las Américas–Dr. José Francisco Peña Gómez International Airport (Spanish: Aeropuerto Internacional de Las Américas Dr. José Francisco Peña Gómez), is an international airport located in Punta Caucedo, near Santo Domingo and Boca Chica in the Dominican Republic. The airport is run by Aerodom, a private corporation based in the Dominican Republic, under a 25-year concession to build, operate, and transfer (BOT) six of the country's airports. Las Américas usually receives a wide variety of long-, mid-, and short-haul aircraft. Santo Domingo's other airport, La Isabela, is much smaller and used by smaller aircraft only.

The airport is the second-busiest in the country, after Punta Cana International Airport, and one of the largest in the Caribbean, handling 5.490 million passengers in 2023. It is also the busiest cargo hub in the Caribbean and Central America, with 355,000,000 lbs of cargo transported in 2019. The airport has two terminals (A and B). A new terminal is expected to be inaugurated by the end of 2028.

== History ==
Las Américas Airport opened in 1959 as the official airport of Ciudad Trujillo, the capital of the Dominican Republic, with the city subsequently changing its name to Santo Domingo. The official name of the airport was changed in 2002 to "Aeropuerto Internacional Las Américas- José Francisco Peña Gómez (AIJFPG)" but is known as "Las Américas International Airport", or locally, "Las Américas Airport, AILA or "El Aeropuerto".

In April 1953, Chicago and Southern Air Lines, a U.S. based air carrier, was operating a weekly Lockheed Constellation service into Ciudad Trujillo with a southbound routing of Memphis - New Orleans - Port-au-Prince - Ciudad Trujillo - San Juan, PR and a northbound routing of San Juan - Ciudad Trujillo - Port-au-Prince - New Orleans - Memphis - St. Louis - Chicago. By 1954, U.S. based Delta Air Lines (which was known as "Delta C&S" at the time following its acquisition and merger with Chicago and Southern Air Lines in May 1953) was serving the Dominican Republic on a daily basis via the then-named General Andrews Airport in Ciudad Trujillo with nonstop flights to San Juan, Puerto Rico and Port au Prince, Haiti operated with Convair 340 twin prop aircraft. The eastbound Delta flights operated a daily routing of Houston - New Orleans - Havana, Cuba - Port-au-Prince - Ciudad Trujillo - San Juan and the westbound Delta flights operated a daily routing of San Juan - Ciudad Trujillo - Port-au-Prince - Havana - New Orleans. Also during the mid-1950s, U.S. based Pan American World Airways (Pan Am) was serving Ciudad Trujillo with nonstop flights to New York City, Miami and Port-au-Prince operated with Douglas DC-6 four engine propliners (which the airline called the "Super-6 Clipper"). In 1960, locally based Dominicana de Aviacion, the former flag carrier of the Dominican Republic, was operating scheduled international passenger service nonstop between the airport and Miami with Douglas DC-4 four engine propliners and also nonstop between the airport and San Juan, Puerto Rico with Douglas DC-3 and Curtiss C-46 twin prop aircraft.

By the early and mid-1960s, several airlines were operating international jet service from the airport including Pan Am with Boeing 707 service nonstop to New York City, Miami, San Juan, Puerto Rico, Kingston, Jamaica and Curaçao as well as direct, no change of plane 707 service to Montego Bay, Caracas, Port of Spain, Georgetown, Guyana and Paramaribo while Brazil-based VARIG was operating Sud Aviation Caravelle and Convair 990 jetliner flights nonstop to New York City and Miami as well as direct, no change of plane jet service to Port of Spain, Belém, Fortaleza, Recife, Rio de Janeiro, São Paulo and Porto Alegre.

By 1976, the airport was being served by American Airlines with nonstop Boeing 707 and Boeing 747 flights from New York City, Dominicana de Aviacion with nonstop Boeing 727-100, Boeing 727-200, Boeing 707-399C, Boeing 747 and McDonnell Douglas DC-10 (leased aircraft) service from New York City, Miami and San Juan, Puerto Rico, Eastern Airlines with nonstop Boeing 727-100 service from San Juan, Puerto Rico as well as direct, no change of plane 727 flights from Cleveland and Miami, Pan Am with nonstop Boeing 707 service from Port au Prince as well as direct, one stop 707 service from Miami, ALM Antillean Airlines with nonstop and direct one stop McDonnell Douglas DC-9-30 service from Curaçao, Viasa with nonstop Douglas DC-8 service from Curaçao and direct one stop DC-8 flights from Caracas, and locally based Aerovias Quisqueyana with nonstop Boeing 707 and Douglas DC-8 service from Miami and San Juan, Puerto Rico. Also in 1976, Aerovias Quisqueyana was operating nonstop Boeing 707 transatlantic service from the airport to Madrid with this flight also providing direct one stop service to Rome.

According to the Official Airline Guide (OAG), in 1996 a number of European-based airlines were operating transatlantic flights from the airport including Air France with nonstop Boeing 747 service to Paris, Alitalia with nonstop Boeing 767-300 service to Rome, Condor Airlines with nonstop Boeing 767-300 service to both Cologne/Bonn and Frankfurt, Iberia Airlines with nonstop McDonnell Douglas DC-10 service to Madrid, LTU International Airways with nonstop McDonnell Douglas MD-11 service to Düsseldorf, Martinair with nonstop Boeing 767-300 service to Amsterdam, and TAP Air Portugal with direct one stop Airbus A310 service to Lisbon. Airline service from the airport to South America in 1996 included nonstop Boeing 727-200 flights to Bogotá operated by ACES Colombia as well as nonstop McDonnell Douglas DC-10 flights to Lima operated by Iberia Airlines in addition to direct, no change of plane Boeing 737-200 flights also to Lima operated by Copa Airlines via a stop at this air carrier's hub in Panama City, Panama. Also according to the OAG, other airlines operating flights into the airport in 1996 included American Airlines with nonstop Airbus A300-600R, McDonnell Douglas DC-10 and McDonnell Douglas MD-11 service from New York City as well as nonstop Airbus A300-600R and Boeing 727-200 service from Miami in addition to direct one stop Airbus A300-600R service from both Boston and Orlando, Continental Airlines with nonstop Boeing 727-200 service from Newark, Trans World Airlines (TWA) with nonstop Boeing 767-200 and Lockheed L-1011 service from New York City, and locally based APA International Air with nonstop Airbus A300 service from both New York City and Miami.

Las Américas was the hub for Dominicana de Aviación, APA International Air, PAWA Dominicana, and a number of other, smaller airlines. Currently Sky High Dominicana and Arajet are based there.

Las Américas also has served as a hub for airlines such as Aeromar Líneas Aéreas Dominicanas, Aero Continente Dominicana and Queen Air.

Recently, the expressway leading from Santo Domingo to the airport (roughly 20 km east of the city center) was expanded and modernised. The airport was also modernised, and two more terminals were added, including 20 more gates. The new expressway crosses a new suspension bridge which spans the Ozama River, connecting traffic into the city's Elevated Freeway and Tunnel system onto the city's main street, Av. 27 de Febrero. A more scenic route following the coastal shore provides beautiful views of the Caribbean Sea and of the city. This secondary road crosses the Ozama River by means of a floating bridge, connecting traffic onto the Av. George Washington (el Malecón) which leads into the heart of the colonial city.

== Facilities ==
Terminal exterior, 2025

=== Terminals ===
Las Américas has five gates on the main satellite concourse (A), A2 through A6. Other gate facilities are for the flights departing from a parking in the taxiway. back in the 1960s and 70s the airport used to be much smaller, The original building was half the size of today's newest structure but with a still modern look. Concourse B has four gates (B1 through B4) and remote stand (P8). Terminal B now features a co-branded Copa Club operated jointly by United Airlines and Copa Airlines, and a Private Lounge exclusive to members and business people. The average number of daily flights in and out of Las Américas ranges between 68 and 84. JetBlue is the largest airline operating at Las Américas. The construction of a new terminal expansion started in June 2025 and expected to be inaugurated on the end of 2028 with a cost of US$250 million. The new terminal is expected to increase passenger numbers annually.

=== Runway ===
Las Américas Airport's runway direction is north–south (designated 17–35). This runway is the largest in the country, and one of the largest in the Caribbean. With a length of 3,355 m, it is able to support a Boeing 747. The runway of SDQ was last renovated in June 2008. The old taxi-way was also renovated and converted into a full runway while the old runway was being renovated, then it was converted back into a taxiway after the normal runway was finished. The runway accommodated the Antonov An-225 to supply goods after the 2010 Haiti earthquake.

== Airlines and destinations ==
=== Passenger ===
The following airlines operate regular scheduled and charter flights at Las Américas International Airport:

Airlines	Destinations
Aeroméxico	Mexico City–Benito Juárez
Aeroméxico Connect	Mexico City–Benito Juárez
Air Canada	Seasonal: Montréal–Trudeau (begins 11 December 2026)
Air Caraïbes	Paris–Orly
Air Europa	Madrid
American Airlines	Miami; Seasonal: Philadelphia
Arajet	Aruba, Bogotá, Boston, Buenos Aires–Ezeiza, Cancún, Cartagena, Curaçao, Guatemala City, Kingston–Norman Manley, Lima, Medellín–JMC, Mexico City–Felipe Ángeles, Miami, Newark, San José (CR), San Juan, St. Maarten
Avianca	Bogotá
Breeze Airways	Tampa (begins 18 June 2027)
Condor	Frankfurt
Copa Airlines	Panama City–Tocumen
Delta Air Lines	Atlanta, New York–JFK
Frontier Airlines	San Juan; Seasonal: Philadelphia, Tampa
Iberia	Madrid
InterCaribbean Airways	Providenciales, Tortola
ITA Airways	Seasonal: Rome–Fiumicino (begins 30 November 2026)
JetBlue	Boston, Fort Lauderdale, New York–JFK, Orlando, San Juan
LASER Airlines	Caracas
Sky High	Anguilla, Antigua, Bonaire, Fort-de-France, Georgetown–Cheddi Jagan, Havana, Holguín, Miami, Paramaribo, Pointe-à-Pitre, Saint Thomas, Santiago de Cuba, St. Kitts
Sunrise Airways	Antigua
United Airlines	Newark
Wingo	Bogotá, Medellín–JMC
World2Fly	Madrid

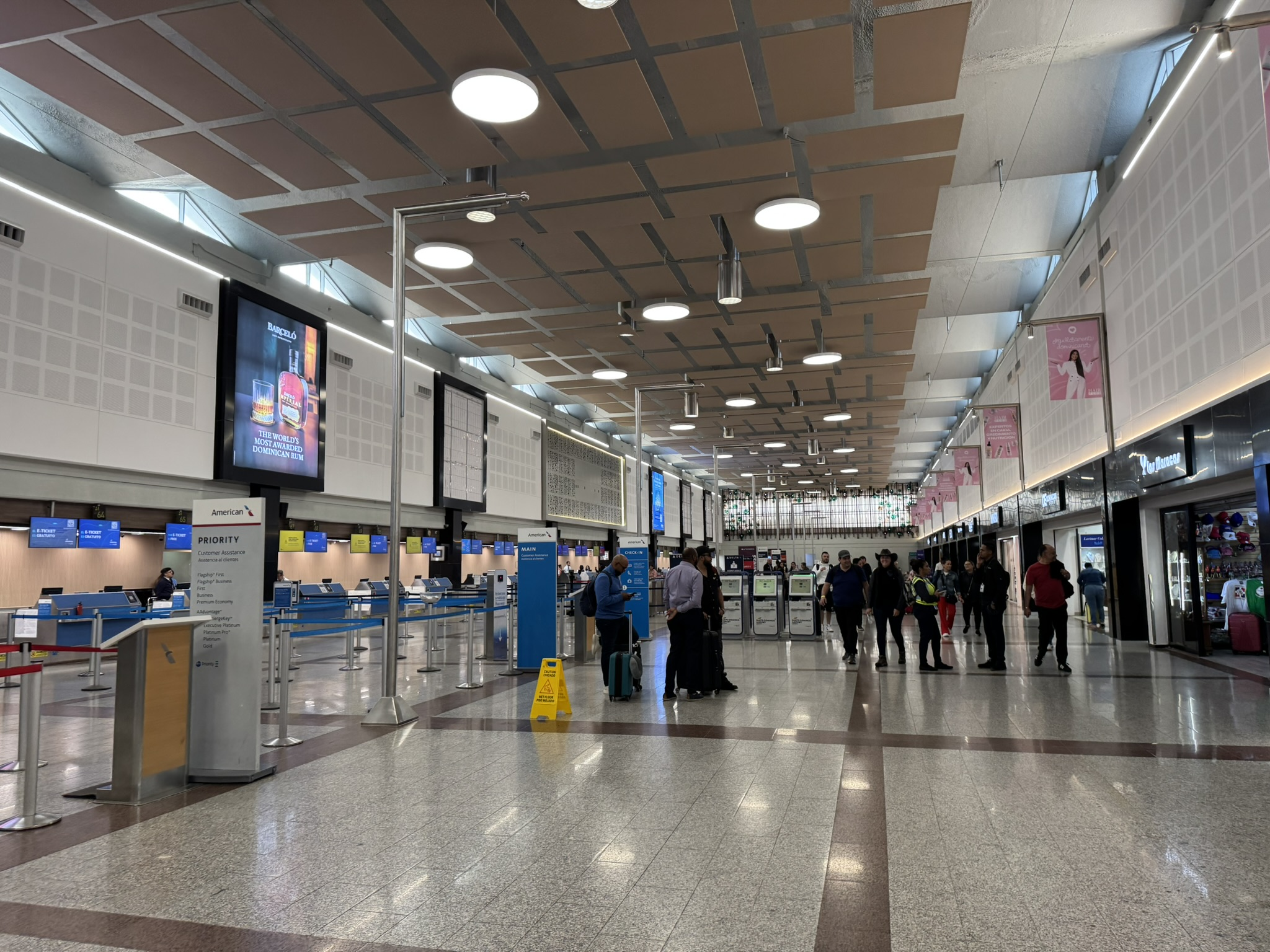
Check-in counters at the airport

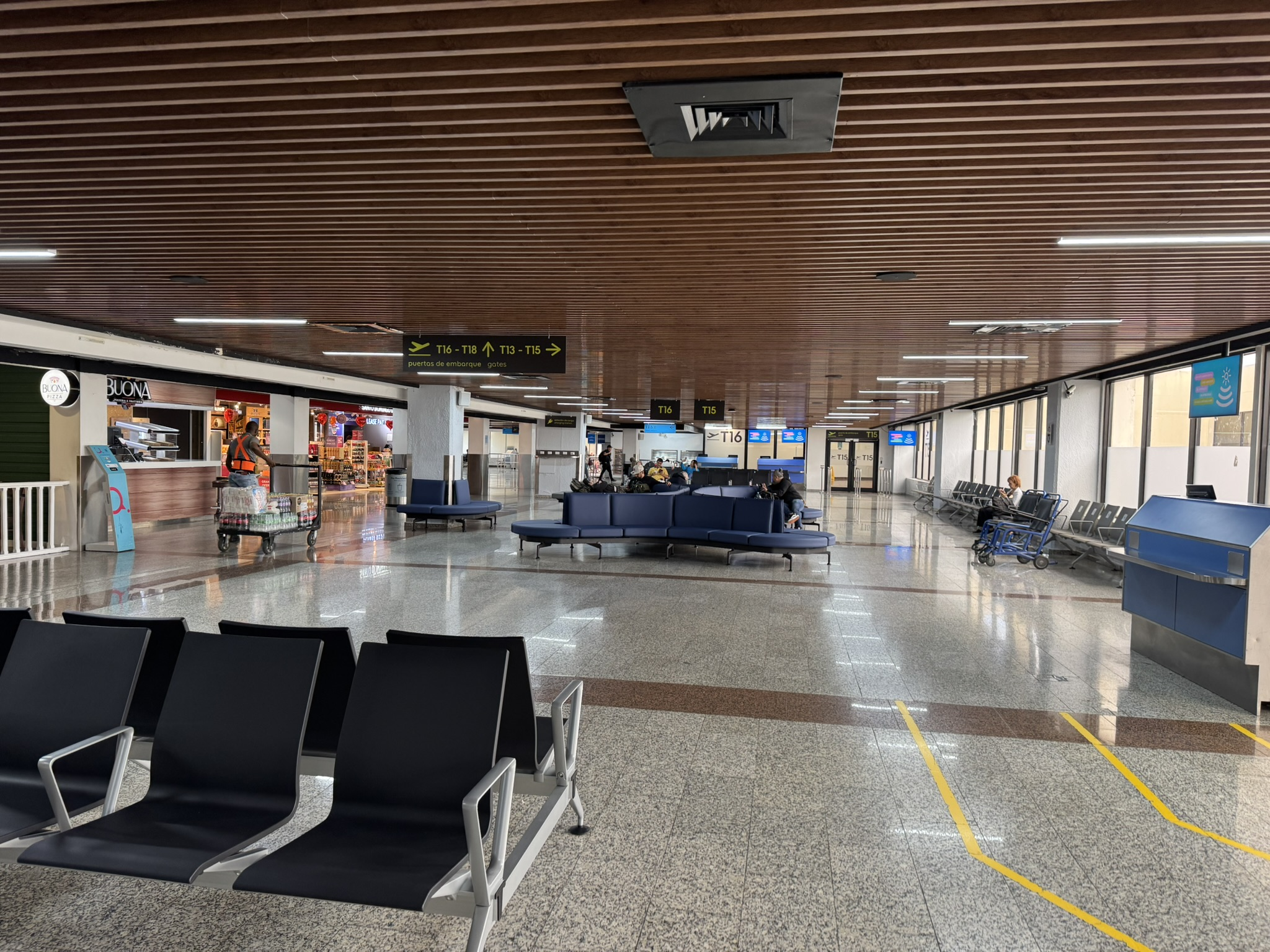
Boarding gates at Terminal B of the airport

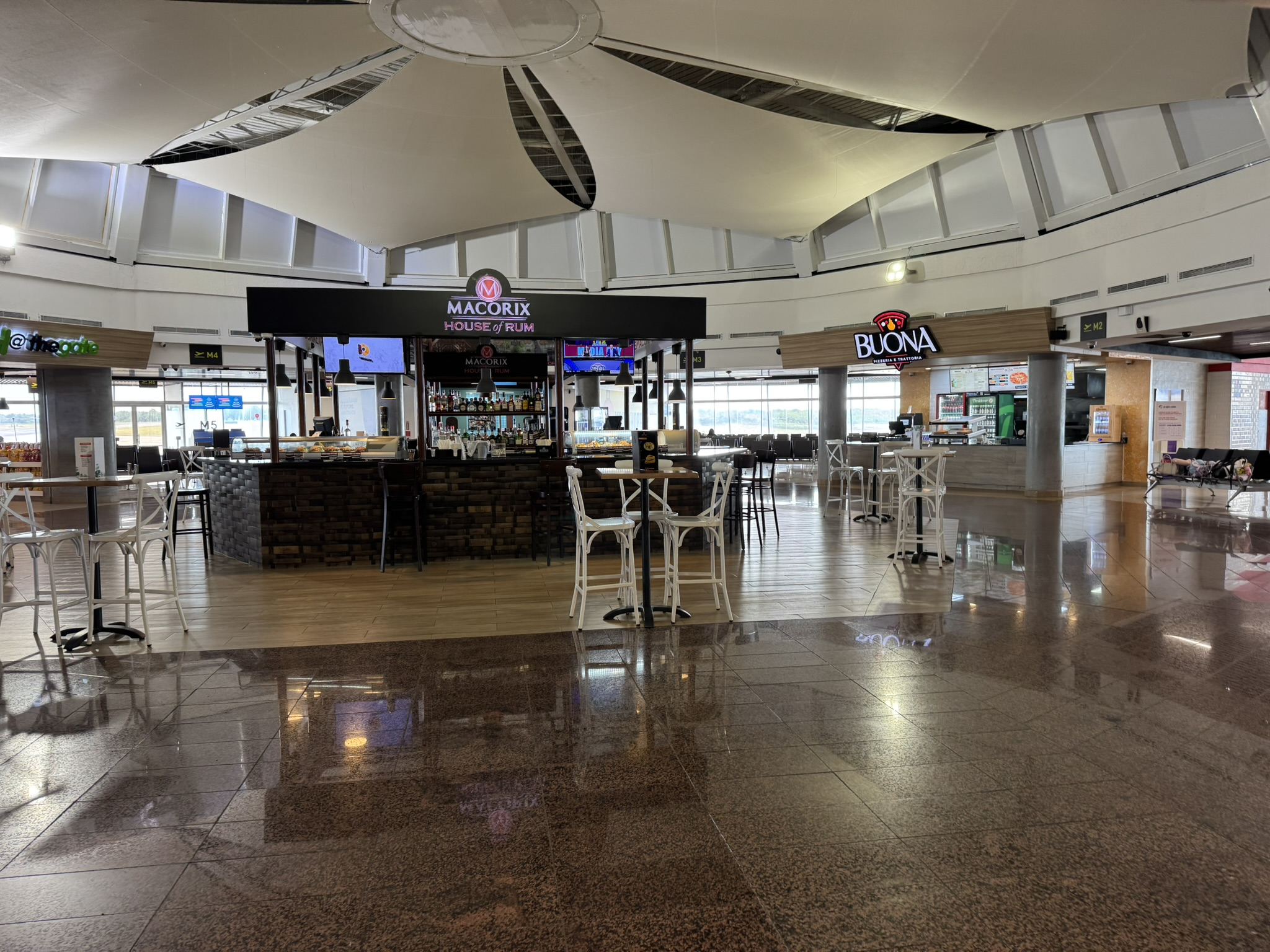
Boarding gates at Terminal A of the airport

=== Cargo ===
Airlines	Destinations
Amerijet International	Barbados, Miami, Punta Cana
UPS Airlines	Louisville, Miami

== Statistics ==
Top routes from Las Américas (2025)
Rank	City	Passengers	Carriers
1	New York–JFK, United States	973,180	Delta Air Lines, JetBlue
2	Miami, United States	621,709	American Airlines, Sky High, Spirit Airlines
3	Madrid–Barajas, Spain	544,610	Air Europa, Iberia, World2Fly
4	Newark, United States	466,068	JetBlue, United Airlines
5	Panama City–Tocumen, Panama	438,719	Copa Airlines
6	Bogotá, Colombia	304,122	Arajet, Avianca, Wingo
7	San Juan, Puerto Rico	301,097	JetBlue, Frontier Airlines, Arajet, Sky High
8	Boston, United States	232,399	JetBlue, Arajet
9	Fort Lauderdale, United States	226,349	JetBlue, Spirit Airlines
10	Orlando, United States	205,194	JetBlue, Spirit Airlines

== Accidents and incidents ==
- On 30 January 1975, Douglas DC-3 HI-222 of LANSA crashed on take-off, killing one of the 30 people on board. The aircraft was on an international scheduled passenger flight to Mais Gate Airport, Port-au-Prince, Haiti.

== See also ==
- List of the busiest airports in Dominican Republic
- List of the busiest airports in the Caribbean
